= 1680 in poetry =

List of years in poetry	(table)
- … 1670; 1671; 1672; 1673; 1674; 1675; 1676; 1677; 1678; 1679; 1680; 1681; 1682; 1683; 1684; 1685; 1686; 1687; 1688; 1689; 1690 …
- In literature 1677 1678 1679 1680 1681 1682 1683
- Art; Archaeology; Architecture; Literature; Music; Philosophy; Science; +...

Nationality words link to articles with information on the nation's poetry or literature (for instance, Irish or France).

== Events ==
- The Irish poem-book Leabhar Cloinne Aodha Buidhe is transcribed by Ruairí Ó hUiginn of Sligo at the command of Cormac Ó Neill.
- Possible approximate date of composition of the Thai poem Kamsuan Samut, attributed to Si Prat.

== Works published ==
- Wentworth Dillon, translator, Horace's Art of Poetry, translation from the Latin of Horace's Ars Poetica, including an essay by Edmund Waller
- John Dryden and others, translators, Ovid's Epistles
- Thomas Otway, The Poet's Complaint of his Muse; or, A Satyr Against Libells
- John Wilmot, Earl of Rochester, Poems on Several Occasions By the Right Honourable The E. of R—, published in London, although the book states it was published in "Antwerpen" (see "Deaths", below) The book includes "The Disappointment" by Aphra Behn.

== Births ==
Death years link to the corresponding "[year] in poetry" article:

- September 22 – Barthold Heinrich Brockes (died 1747), German poet
- Mohammed Awzal (died 1748), Moroccan Berber religious poet
- Bulleh Shah (died 1757), Punjabi Sufi poet, humanist and philosopher

== Deaths ==
Birth years link to the corresponding "[year] in poetry" article:

- July 26 – John Wilmot, 2nd Earl of Rochester (born 1647), English poet, courtier and rake (see "Works", above)
- August 25 – Symeon of Polotsk (born 1629), Belarusian-Russian Baroque poet, dramatist, churchman and enlightener
- September 25 – Samuel Butler (born 1612), English satirical poet
- October 15 – Bedřich Bridel (born 1619), Czech Baroque writer, poet and missionary
- November – Carr Scrope (born 1649), English versifier and courtier
- Approximate date
  - François Colletet (born 1628), French poet
  - Karacaoğlan (born c.1606), Turkish folk poet and ashik

== See also ==
- Poetry
- 17th century in poetry
- 17th century in literature
- Restoration literature
