= 1674 in poetry =

This article covers 1674 in poetry. Nationality words link to articles with information on the nation's poetry or literature (for instance, Irish or France).

== Works published ==
=== France ===
- Nicolas Boileau-Despréaux, France, L'Œuvres diverses du sieur D...., including:
  - L'Art poétique, in imitation of the Ars Poetica of Horace, and very influential in French and English literature; Alexander Pope's Essay on Criticism imitated Boileau's maxims; in four books: the first and last containing general precepts; the second, on the pastoral, elegy, ode, epigram and satire; the third, on epic and tragic poetry
  - Le Lutrin, a mock-heroic poem in four cantos, with two later added by the author
  - Translator, On the Sublime, from the Latin of Longinus; a second edition in 1693 also included certain critical reflections
  - Second Epistle
  - Third Epistle
- Rene Rapin, Reflexions sur la Poetique d' Aristote, criticism, France; translated into English this year by Thomas Rymer

=== Great Britain ===
- Samuel Butler, Hudibras. The First and Second Parts, published anonymously (see Hudibras, the First Part 1663, Hudibras. The Second Part 1664, Hudibras. The Third and Last Part 1678; Hudibras. In Three Parts 1684)
- Thomas Flatman, Poems and Songs
- John Milton, Paradise Lost: A poem in twelve books, the second edition, revised and expanded to 12 books, published in July; commendatory poems by "S.B." in Latin and Andrew Marvell in English (see also Paradise Lost 1667)
- Thomas Rymer, translation, Reflections on Aristotles Treatise of Posie, published anonymously, criticism translated from Rene Rapin's Reflexions sur la Poetique d' Aristote, also published this year

=== Other ===
- Thomas Hansen Kingo, Aandelige Siunge-Koor ("Spiritual Song Choir"), first part (second part 1681), Denmark

== Births ==
Death years link to the corresponding "[year] in poetry" article:

- June 20 – Nicholas Rowe (died 1718), English Poet Laureate, dramatist and miscellaneous writer
- July 17 – Isaac Watts (died 1748), English hymnist, called the "Father of English Hymnody"
- September 11 – Elizabeth Singer Rowe (died 1737) English poet, novelist, devotional writer and playwright
- October 9 (bapt.) – Ambrose Philips (died 1749), English poet and politician
- Also – Mary Davys (died 1732), (probably) Irish-born poet and playwright

== Deaths ==
Birth years link to the corresponding "[year] in poetry" article:

- February 22 – Jean Chapelain (born 1595), French poet and writer
- June 14 – Marin le Roy de Gomberville (born 1600), French poet and novelist
- October 10 – Thomas Traherne (born 1636), English poet and religious writer
- October 15 – Robert Herrick – (born 1591), English poet
- October 27 – Hallgrímur Pétursson (born 1614), one of Iceland's most famous poets and a clergyman
- November 8 – John Milton (born 1608), English poet
- Also:
  - Mehmed IV Giray (born 1610), poet and khan of the Crimean Khanate
  - Neşâtî (born unknown), Ottoman Sufi mystical poet

== See also ==
- Poetry
- 17th century in poetry
- 17th century in literature
- Restoration literature
