= 1684 in poetry =

Nationality words link to articles with information on the nation's poetry or literature (for instance, Irish or France).

== Events ==
- April 15 – Nicolas Boileau-Despréaux, a French poet, critic and scholar, is admitted to the Académie française only by the king's wish
- Japanese poet Ihara Saikaku composes 23,500 verses in 24 hours at the Sumiyoshi-taisha (shrine) at Osaka; the scribes cannot keep pace with his dictation and just count the verses

== Works published ==
- Alaol, Padmavati, in Bengali
- Aphra Behn, Poems Upon Several Occasions
- Samuel Butler, Hudibras. In Three Parts, published anonymously (See also Hudibras, the First Part 1663, Hudibras. The Second Part 1664, Hudibras. The First and Second Parts 1674, Hudibras. The Third and Last Part 1678)
- Thomas Creech:
  - Translator, The Idylliums of Theocritus, with Rapin's Discourse of Pastorals Done into English, translated from Rene Rapin, Treatise de carmine pastorali
  - Translator, The Odes, Satyrs, and Epistles of Horace, the only complete translation of Horace's poems until that of Philip Francis (see 1743, 1747)
- Wentworth Dillon, fourth Earl of Roscommon, An Essay on Translated Verse, criticism in verse form, a second edition was also published this year
- John Dryden and Jacob Tonson, editors, Miscellany Poems, first in a series of miscellanies published by Tonson (see also Sylvae 1685, Examen Poeticum 1693, Annual Miscellany 1694, Poetical Miscellaneis: Fifth Part 1704; Sixth Part 1709)
- Thomas D'Urfey, The Malcontent: a Satyr, published anonymously; a sequel to The Progress of Honesty 1681
- John Norris, Poems and Discourses. Occasionally written
- John Oldham, The Works of Mr John Oldham, posthumously published

== Births ==
Death years link to the corresponding "[year] in poetry" article:

- December 3 – Ludvig Holberg (died 1754), Danish poetry/Norwegian poet and playwright

== Deaths ==
Birth years link to the corresponding "[year] in poetry" article:

- Wu Jiaji (born 1618), Chinese poet

== See also ==
- Poetry
- 17th century in poetry
- 17th century in literature
- Restoration literature
