= 1681 in poetry =

This article covers 1674 in poetry. Nationality words link to articles with information on the nation's poetry or literature (for instance, Irish or France).

Had we but world enough, and time,

This coyness, Lady, were no crime

We would sit down and think which way

To walk and pass our long love's day.

— First lines from Andrew Marvell's To His Coy Mistress, first published (posthumously) this year

== Works published ==
=== Great Britain ===
- Richard Baxter, Poetical Fragments
- Charles Cotton, The Wonders of the Peake
- John Dryden, Absalom and Achitophel, published anonymously; a satire on Anthony Ashley Cooper, earl of Shaftesbury and James Scott, Duke of Monmouth (see also The Second Part of Absalom and Achitophel as well as other poetic responses 1682)
- Thomas D'Urfey, The Progress of Honesty; or, A View of a Court and City (see also The Malcontent 1684)
- Andrew Marvell (died 1678), Miscellaneous Poems, including "To His Coy Mistress"
- John Oldham, published anonymously
  - Satyrs upon the Jesuits (the first "Satyr Upon the Jesuits" had been published in 1679 in the form of a broadside under the title Garnets Ghost)
  - Some New Pieces Never Before Publisht

=== Other ===
- Thomas Hansen Kingo, Aandelige Siunge-Koor ("Spiritual Song Choir"), second part (first part 1674), Denmark

== Births ==
Death years link to the corresponding "[year] in poetry" article:

- March 24 (March 14 O.S.) – Georg Philipp Telemann (died 1767), German composer and poet
- Johann Ernst Hanxleden (died 1732), German poet and lexicographer
- Nedîm (died 1730), Ottoman poet

== Deaths ==
Birth years link to the corresponding "[year] in poetry" article:

- May 25 – Pedro Calderón de la Barca (born 1600), Spanish writer, poet and dramatist
- August 12 – Sir George Wharton, 1st Baronet (born 1617), English Royalist soldier, astrologer and poet
- October 7 – Nikolaes Heinsius (born 1620), Dutch poet and scholar
- December – Charles Cotin (born 1604), French abbé, philosopher and poet
- Magha 9, 1603 (Saka era) – Samarth Ramdas (born 1608), Marathi saint and religious poet

== See also ==
- Poetry
- 17th century in poetry
- 17th century in literature
- Restoration literature
