= 1664 in poetry =

This article covers 1664 in poetry. Nationality words link to articles with information on the nation's poetry and literature (for instance, Irish or France).

== Works published ==
- Henry Bold, Poems Lyrique Macaronique Heroique
- Samuel Butler, Hudibras. The Second Part: By the authour of the First, a spurious poem titled Hudibras. The Second Part, was published in 1663, before this genuine second part (see also Hudibras, the First Part 1663, Hudibras. The First and Second Parts 1674, Hudibras. The Third and Last Part 1678, and Hudibras. In Three Parts 1684)
- Charles Cotton, Scarronides; or, Virgile Travestie, published anonymously (see also Scarronides 1665, 1667)
- Thomas Jordan, Poems and Songs
- Katherine Philips, Poems by the Incomparable Mrs. K.P., unauthorised
- Sir William Temple, Upon the Death of Mrs Catherine Philips, published anonymously
- George Wither, Tuba-Pacifica

== Births ==
Death years link to the corresponding "[year] in poetry" article:

- July 21 - Matthew Prior (died 1721), English poet
- Sonome (died 1726), Japanese zen poet

== Deaths ==
Birth years link to the corresponding "[year] in poetry" article:

- February 5 - Christen Aagaard (born 1616), Danish poet and professor
- June 22 - Katharine Philips (born 1631), Welsh poet
- July 16 - Andreas Gryphius (born 1616), German poet and dramatist
- November 18 - Miklós Zrínyi (born 1620), Croatian and Hungarian warrior, statesman and poet

== See also ==
- Poetry
- 17th century in poetry
- 17th century in literature
- Restoration literature
