= 1605 in poetry =

Nationality words link to articles with information on the nation's poetry or literature (for instance, Irish or France).

== Events ==
- François de Malherbe is attached this year to the court of Henry IV of France

== Works ==
=== Great Britain ===
- Nicholas Breton:
  - The Honour of Valour
  - The Soules Immortall Crowne
- Samuel Daniel, Certaine Small Poems Lately Printed
- John Davies of Hereford:
  - Humours Heav'n on Earth
  - Wittes Pilgrimage (by Poeticall Essaies)
- Robert Jones, Ultimum Vale
- Samuel Rowlands:
  - Hell's Broke Loose, on John of Leiden, a Dutch Anabaptist
  - Humors Antique Faces, published anonymously
- Joshua Sylvester, translator, Bartas: his Devine Weekes and Works Translated, translated from Guillaume de Salluste du Bartas; includes previously published translations
- Peter Woodhouse, The Flea

=== Other ===
- Pedro de Espinosa, editor, Flores de poetas ilustres (anthology), Spain
- François de Malherbe, Prière pour le roi Henri le Grand, allant en Limousin, because of this poem, he became the poet laureate of the French Court
- Jean Vauquelin de La Fresnaye:
  - Discours pour servir de Préface sur le Sujet de la Satyre published from 1604 through this year
  - L’Art poétique de Vauquelin de la Fresnaye : où l’on peut remarquer la Perfection et le Défaut des Anciennes et des Modernes Poésies ("The Poetic Art of Vauquelin de la Fresnaye: where one can observe the Perfection and Failure of Ancient and Modern Poems") written beginning in 1574 at the request of Henry III of France, first published this year, criticism, France

== Births ==
- March 28 – Nishiyama Sōin 西山宗因, born Nishiyama Toyoichi 西山豊 (died 1682), Japanese early Tokugawa period haikai-no-renga (comical renga) poet, founder of the Danrin ("talkative forest") school of haikai poetry
- June – Thomas Randolph (died 1635), English poet and dramatist
- July 29 – Simon Dach (died 1659), Prussian German lyrical poet and hymn writer
- November 4 – William Habington (died 1654), English poet
- Also:
  - Peter Hausted (died 1644), English playwright, poet and preacher
  - Sor Marcela de San Félix (died 1688), Spanish nun, poet and dramatist, illegitimate daughter of Lope de Vega
  - William Mercer (died 1675), Scottish poet and army officer
  - Lady Hester Pulter, born Hester Ley (died 1678), Irish-born English poet

== Deaths ==
- September 23 – Pontus de Tyard (born c. 1521), French poet and priest, a member of "La Pléiade"
- Also:
  - Diogo Bernardes died about this year (born c. 1530), Portuguese poet, brother of Frei Agostinho da Cruz
  - Thomas Hudson (born unknown), English musician and poet
