= The Yard of Wit =

The Yard of Wit: Male Creativity and Sexuality, 1650–1750
- Cover of first edition
- Author: Raymond Stephanson
- Language: English
- Subject: Literary criticism Cultural history
- Publisher: University of Pennsylvania Press
- Publication date: 2003
- Publication place: United States
- Media type: Print
- Pages: 312
- ISBN: 978-0812237580

The Yard of Wit: Male Creativity and Sexuality, 1650–1750 is a 2003 book by literature scholar and professor Raymond Stephanson.

== Overview ==
In the book, Raymond Stephanson examines how the male literary establishment in England between 1650 and 1750 used metaphors of male genitalia and sexuality as rhetorical expressions of literary work and achievement. He devotes a great deal of his argument to Alexander Pope, in whose work, Stephanson contends, these genital references have an especially prominent place.

== Reception ==
The Yard of Wit: Male Creativity and Sexuality, 1650–1750 was widely and mostly positively reviewed in academic journals.

G. D. Fulton, reviewing the book in the Canadian Journal of History, said "Professor Stephanson's title, 'the yard of wit,' functions throughout the study as a shorthand reference to the strikingly different, even mutually contradictory ways in which a wide range of discourses—scientific, medical, judicial, literary, erotic, pornographic—used male genitalia to understand and evaluate male personality, creativity, and relations to other men."

Fulton also noted the care with which Stephanson handled the theme of male genitalia: "Professor Stephanson also respects his audience. It may not be possible to write about this topic with what all readers will consider consistently good taste, but he writes tactfully, mentioning rather than using taboo words wherever possible and relying on elegant variation to name what must be named most often: an ingenious, well-calculated deployment of 'yard,' 'pintle,' 'pego,' and other eighteenth-century synonyms for 'penis.'"

George E. Haggerty, writing in the Journal of the History of Sexuality, found that Stephanson's book did justice to the

vast range of literary material from this period that takes as its subject the size, functionality, and production of the male member. Variously called the yard, the pego, the pintle, the prick, and so forth, the penis is shown in this study to be a central overriding metaphor for male creativity. Stephanson explains how various "collective metaphorical equations played a significant role in establishing the widespread associations of the male mind as sexualized body," and he sets out to show how this physiological system came to mark the literature of the period in general, not just in the work of libertine apologists but in fiction, satire, poetry, and pamphlet writing of various kinds. In addition, he hopes to show how "Pope became the first public emblem of these developments, symbolizing the first commercial traffic in the yard to wit."

Hugh Ormsby-Lennon in the University of Toronto Quarterly judged the book a success: "Stephanson's range of reading and allusion is impressive. . . . This is a compelling and eye-opening book, both for its bold thesis and for the coruscating light it sheds upon the workaday world of writing as well as upon major works ranging from Rochester's unbuttoned satires and lyrics to Tristram Shandy and to Pope's less familiar but disconcertingly phallic poems.”

Linda Zionkowski, reviewing The Yard of Wit in Eighteenth-Century Fiction, offered a highly laudatory review. She wrote: "Joining the fairly recent project to historicize masculinity, The Yard of Wit takes as its subject the rich early modern discourse of male creativity, explaining how different configurations of sexual tropes—both literal and metaphoric references to the genitals in action—define the poetic character for male writers. This sexualized construction of authorship, Raymond Stephanson argues, both imagined creative ability as genital potency and ranked the writer’s position in the public, competitive world of the literary marketplace according to his capacity for virility and manliness."

One negative assessment came from Adam Rounce in The Cambridge Quarterly: "Raymond Stephanson's exploration of the relationship between the penis and male creativity from the Restoration to the death of Alexander Pope begins with the author's puzzled sense of fellow academics not taking his topic seriously."

Rounce found Stephanson's focus on the role of penis envy to be so overriding that it distorted Pope's importance in other respects: "[S]uspicion grows when every example is read through such a lens to the almost complete detriment of any other factor. Pope here is so remorselessly repressed and full of penis envy that it would seem a wonder to the uninformed reader that he managed to become by a distance the most considerable, successful, and influential poet of the century; Stephanson is so busy chasing him into another neurotic corner that it seems to have slipped his mind as well."

== See also ==
- Alexander Pope
- Restoration literature

== Sources ==
- Fulton, G. D. (August 2005). "Review of The Yard of Wit: Male Creativity and Sexuality, 1650-1750". Canadian Journal of History. XL: 320–322. doi:10.3138/cjh.40.2.320.
- Haggerty, George E. (2005). "Review of The Yard of Wit: Male Creativity and Sexuality, 1650-1750". Journal of the History of Sexuality. 14 (3): 347–352. doi:10.1353/sex.2006.0022. ISSN 1043-4070. JSTOR 3704661. S2CID 142648538.
- Ormsby-Lennon, Hugh (Winter 2004). "Review of The Yard of Wit: Male Creativity and Sexuality, 1650-1750". University of Toronto Quarterly. 74 (1): 420–422. doi:10.1353/utq.2005.0174. ISSN 0042-0247.
- Rounce, Adam (2006). Stephanson, Raymond; Cryle, Peter; O'Connell, Lisa (eds.). "The Joy of Sex". The Cambridge Quarterly. 35 (2): 192–196. doi:10.1093/camqtly/bfl004. ISSN 0008-199X. JSTOR 42967324.
- Zionkowski, Linda (2005). "Review of The Yard of Wit: Male Creativity and Sexuality, 1650-1750". Eighteenth-Century Fiction. 18 (1): 153–155. doi:10.1353/ecf.2006.0017. S2CID 161462915.
