= 1682 in poetry =

This article covers 1682 in poetry. Nationality words link to articles concerning that nation's poetry or literature (for example, Irish or French).

== Works published ==
- Matthew Coppinger, Poems, Songs and Lover-Verses, upon Several Subjects
- Thomas Creech, translator, De Natura Rerum, published anonymously; translated from the Latin of Lucretius's De Rerum Natura
- John Dryden:
  - Mac Flecknoe; or, A satyr upon the True-Blew-Protestant Poet, T.S., pointed at Thomas Shadwell
  - The Medall: A satyre against sedition, a satire on Anthony Ashley Cooper (a target of the author's 1681 satire, Absalom and Achitophel); commendatory poem by Nahum Tate; see Samual Pordage's response, below
  - Religio Laici; or, A Laymans Faith
- Thomas D'Urfey, Butler's Ghost; or, Hudibras. The Fourth Part, a continuation of Samuel Butler's Hudibras (Part 1 published in 1663)
- Robert Gould, Love Given O're; or, A Satyr Against the Pride, Lust and Inconstancy of Woman, published anonymously (see also Sarah Egerton, The Female Advocate 1686 in poetry, Richard Ames, Sylvia's Revenge 1688, and Ames' Sylvia's Complaint, of Her Sexes Unhappiness 1692)
- Cotton Mather, A Poem Dedicated to the Memory of [...] Urian Oakes, English Colonial America (Massachusetts)
- Samuel Pordage, The Medal Revers'd: A satyre against persecution, a response to John Dryden's The Medall (see above)
- Elkanah Settle, Absalom Senior; or, Achitophel Transpros'd, published anonymously; a reply to the first part of John Dryden's Absalom and Achitophel 1681
- Thomas Shadwell, The Medal of John Bayes: A satyr against folly and knavery, published anonymously; an answer to John Dryden's The Medall (see above; see also Mac Flecknoe, above)
- John Sheffield, Duke of Buckingham, also known as the "Earl of Mulgrave", An Essay upon Poetry, published anonymously; in verse; an attack on the late John Wilmot, Earl of Rochester
- Nahum Tate, adaptor, and others, The Second Part of Absalom and Achitophel, a sequel to Absalom and Achitophel of 1681 by John Dryden and, like that poem, directed against Anthony Ashley Cooper, earl of Shaftesbury and James Scott, Duke of Monmouth; mostly written by Tate

== Births ==
Death years link to the corresponding "[year] in poetry" article:

- Vijaya Dasa (died 1755), Indian devotional poet
- Jane Wiseman (died 1717), English actress, poet and playwright

== Deaths ==
Birth years link to the corresponding "[year] in poetry" article:

- May 5 – Nishiyama Sōin 西山宗因, born Nishiyama Toyoichi 西山豊 (born 1605), Japanese early Tokugawa period haikai-no-renga (comical renga) poet who founded the Danrin ("talkative forest") school of haikai poetry

== See also ==
- Poetry
- 17th century in poetry
- 17th century in literature
- Restoration literature
