= 1618 in poetry =

List of years in poetry	(table)
- … 1608; 1609; 1610; 1611; 1612; 1613; 1614; 1615; 1616; 1617; 1618; 1619; 1620; 1621; 1622; 1623; 1624; 1625; 1626; 1627; 1628 …
- In literature 1615 1616 1617 1618 1619 1620 1621
- Art; Archaeology; Architecture; Literature; Music; Philosophy; Science; +...

Nationality words link to articles with information on the nation's poetry or literature (for instance, Irish or France).

== Works published ==
=== Great Britain ===
- George Chapman, translator, The Georgicks of Hesiod, from the Greek of Hesiod's Works and Days
- Sir John Harington, The Most Elegant and Witty Epigrams of Sir John Harrington (see also Epigrams Both Pleasant and Serious 1615)
- John Taylor, The Pennylesse Pilgrimage

=== Other ===
- Jacob Cats, Emblemata or Minnebeelden with Maegdenplicht, Netherlands
- Etienne de Pleure, Sacra Aeneis, cento
- Juan Martínez de Jáuregui y Aguilar, Rimas, lyrics, including translations of Horace, Martial and Ausonius, with a controversial preface which attracts much attention because of its strong opposition to the culteranismo of Luis de Góngora, Spain

== Births ==
Death years link to the corresponding "[year] in poetry" article:

- Late – Abraham Cowley (died 1667), English
- Wu Jiaji (died 1684), Chinese

== Deaths ==
Birth years link to the corresponding "[year] in poetry" article:

- April 19 – Thomas Bastard (born 1566), English poet and clergyman
- July – John Davies of Hereford (born 1565), Anglo-Welsh poet
- August 23 – Gerbrand Adriaensz Bredero (born 1585), Dutch poet and playwright
- September 28 – Josuah Sylvester (born 1563), English poet
- October 29 – Sir Walter Ralegh (born c. 1554), English adventurer and author, executed
- December 6 – Jacques Davy Duperron (born 1556), French cardinal, politician and poet
- Also:
  - Richard Stanihurst, also spelled "Stanyhurst" (born 1547), Irish translator, poet, historian and alchemist
  - Probable year – Bento Teixeira (born c. 1561), Portuguese poet
