= 1678 in poetry =

This article covers 1678 in poetry. Nationality words link to articles with information on the nation's poetry or literature (for instance, Irish or France).

== Works published ==
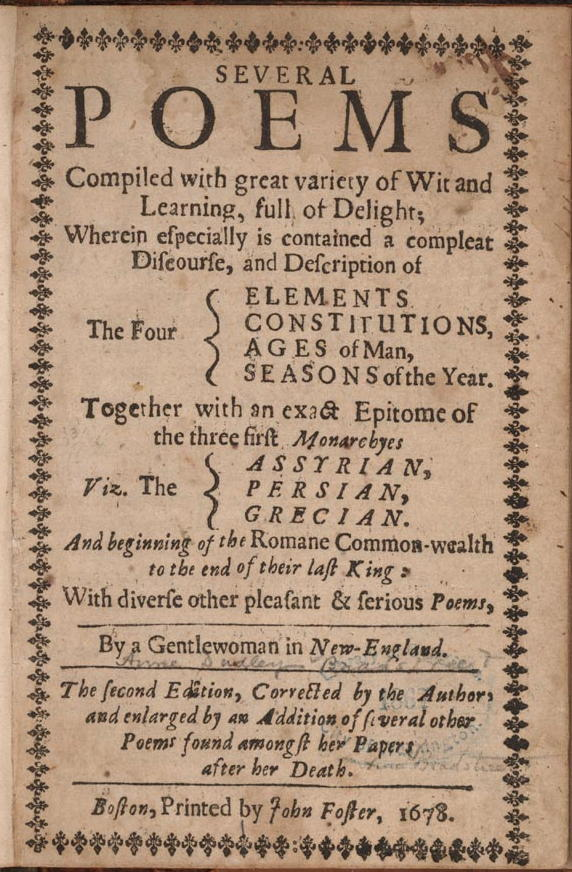
Bradstreet's first posthumous edition

- Anne Bradstreet, Several Poems Compiled with Great Variety of Wit and Learning, a reprint of The Tenth Muse Lately Sprung Up in America, published in Boston, Massachusetts (original volume published in London in 1650) with significant additions, including "Contemplations", said to be her best poem; original, full title: "The Tenth Muse, lately Sprung up in America, or Several Poems Compiled with Great Variety of Wit and Learning, Full of Delight, Wherein especially is Contained a Complete Discourse and Description of the Four Elements, Constitutions, Ages of Man, Seasons of the Year, together with an exact Epitome of the Four Monarchies, viz., The Assyrian, Persian, Grecian, Roman, Also a Dialogue between Old England and New, concerning the late troubles. With divers other pleasand and serious Poems, By a Gentlewoman in those parts"; includes "In Praise of Mistress Bradstreet", a poem by Nathaniel Ward
- Samuel Butler, Hudibras. The Third and Last Part, "by the author of the first and second parts" (see also Hudibras, the First Part 1663, Hudibras. The Second Part 1664, Hudibras. The First and Second Parts 1674; Hudibras. In Three Parts 1684)
- "Ephelia", a pen name, possibly Joan Philips, A Poem to His Sacred Majesty, on the Plot, on the Popish Plot
- Dorthe Engelbrechtsdatter, Själens aandelige Sangoffer ("The Souls Spiritual Offering of Song")
- John Norris of Bemerton, Poems
- Henry Vaughan, Thalia Rediviva, including previously published works and Latin poems by Henry's brother, Thomas Vaughan

== Births ==
Death years link to the corresponding "[year] in poetry" article:

- August 12 - Jacob Maschius (born c.1630), Norwegian clergyman, poet and copperplate engraver

== Deaths ==
Birth years link to the corresponding "[year] in poetry" article:

- April 9 (bur.) - Lady Hester Pulter (born c.1605), Irish-born English poet
- May 14 or 15 - Anna Maria van Schurman (born 1607), Dutch painter, poet and linguist
- August 16 - Andrew Marvell (born 1621), English metaphysical poet and parliamentarian
- Approximate date - Richard Flecknoe (born 1600), English dramatist and poet

== See also ==
- Poetry
- List of years in poetry
- List of years in literature
- 17th century in poetry
- 17th century in literature
- Restoration literature
