= The Disappointment (Aphra Behn) =

"The Disappointment" is a poem written by Aphra Behn, adapting freely from part of the French poem "L'occasion perdue recouverte" by Jean Benech de Cantenac. It was first published in 1680 (see 1680 in poetry) in the Earl of Rochester's Poems on Several Occasions and originally was believed to be Rochester’s own work. However, four years later, the poem was re-published in Aphra Behn’s Poems on Several Occasions and she received proper credit.

== Summary ==
Lysander, a shepherd, attempts to rape Cloris, a maid. After a lengthy attempt, Lysander is unable to perform and Cloris escapes (the last line of the poem refers to "the Hell of Impotence", though one interpretation of the earlier line "Th' Insensible fell weeping in his Hands" is that he prematurely ejaculates). Behn's focus on the female sexual experience is unusual for the time, though not unusual for Behn. Behn often dealt with overt sexuality in her writing, but this perspective often was not accepted by the public until well after her death.

== Themes ==
"The Disappointment" is grouped with other male 'imperfect enjoyment' poems, where a male's failing is attributed to female beauty. Rather than focus on explaining Lysander's failure, Behn is concerned with Cloris's disappointment, as the title of the poem illustrates. Another interesting aspect of the poem is the way Aphra Behn personifies honor and shame as existing externally from Cloris as if honor “abandons” her of its own free will, and shame replaces it without Cloris’ consent.

== Critical reception ==
Though many critics disliked Behn’s work during her lifetime, Aphra Behn today is lauded as one of the most influential women writers. Virginia Woolf in A Room of One’s Own stated that all women owe a debt to Aphra Behn, who “earned them the right to speak their minds”. Today, Aphra Behn is credited with being a proto-feminist, and her works are studied as some of the most important works written by women during the time period.
