= Guillaume Colletet =

French poet

Guillaume Colletet (12 March 1598 – 11 February 1659) was a French poet and a founder member of the Académie française. His son was François Colletet.

== Biography ==
Colletet was born and died in Paris. He had a great reputation among his contemporaries and enjoyed the patronage of several important people, including Cardinal Richelieu, with whom he sometimes collaborated and who once gave him 600 livres for six verses.

Colletet married, in succession, three female servants, one of whom, Claudine Le Nain, he attempted to pass off as a poet in her own right, himself composing works which she then signed. When he realised he was dying, he produced a poem stating that she was giving up poetry following her husband's death; but no one was fooled. Jean de La Fontaine wrote an epigram on the subject.

== Works ==
- Divertissements ;
- poems (tragedies, pastorals, etc.), including le Banquet des Poètes (1646);
- Epigramme (1653);
- Histoire des poètes français .
- Much-esteemed treatises on moral poetry, sonnets and eclogues, gathered under the title d'Art poétique, 1658
- Translations, including of the Couches de la Vierge by Jacopo Sannazaro and of works by Scévole de Sainte-Marthe.

== See also ==
- Guirlande de Julie
