= 1693 in poetry =

Nationality words link to articles with information on the nation's poetry or literature (for instance, Irish or France).

== Events ==
- John Locke writes his essay Some Thoughts Concerning Education which discusses how poetry and music should not be included as part of an educational curriculum

== Works ==
=== Britain ===
- Richard Ames, Fatal Friendship; or, The Drunkards Misery
- John Dryden and Jacob Tonson, editors, Examen Poeticum: Being the Third Part of Miscellany Poems, one of six anthologies published by Tonson from 1684 to 1709; sometimes this is referred to as "Tonson's third Miscellany, sometimes as "Dryden's third Miscellany, or just "the third Miscellany; the volume includes:
  - Dryden's translation of the first book of Ovid's Metamorphoses
  - Dryden, "Iphis and Ianthe", a "fable" translated from Book 9 of Metamorphoses
  - Dryden, "Acis, Polyphemus and Galatea", translation from Book 13 of Metamorphoses
  - Dryden, "The Last Parting of Hector and Andromache", translation from Homer's Iliad
- John Dryden, editor, The Satires of Decimus Junius Juvenalis, an anthology including translations by Dryden, Nahum Tate, William Congreve and others
- Robert Gould, The Corruption of the Times by Money
- Benjamin Keach, The Everlasting Covenant
- Samuel Wesley, The Life of Our Blessed Lord

=== Other languages ===
- Nicolas Boileau-Despréaux, Discours sur l'Ode, criticism; the author defended Pindar and advocated enthusiasm in lyric poetry

== Births ==
Death years link to the corresponding "[year] in poetry" article:

- Hildebrand Jacob, English poet (died 1739)

== Deaths ==
Birth years link to the corresponding "[year] in poetry" article:

- January 8 – Jan Andrzej Morsztyn (born 1621), Polish poet and member of the noble Szlachta class
- September 9 – Ihara Saikaku (born 1642), Japanese poet and creator of the ukiyo-zōshi ("books of the floating world") genre of prose fiction
- December 13 – Dosoftei (born 1624), Moldavian Metropolitan, scholar, poet and translator

== See also ==
- List of years in poetry
- List of years in literature
- 17th century in poetry
- 17th century in literature
- Poetry
