= 1620 in poetry =

This article covers 1620 in poetry. Nationality words link to articles with information on the nation's poetry or literature (for instance, Irish or France).

== Works published ==
- Thomas Dekker, Dekker his Dreame
- Sir Thomas Overbury, The First and Second Part of the Remedy of Love, translated from Ovid, Remedia amoris; published posthumously (died 1613)
- Henry Peacham the younger, Thalias Banquet: Furnished with an hundred and odde dishes of newly devised epigrammes
- Francis Quarles, A Feast of Wormes: Set forth in a poem of the history of Jonah
- Samuel Rowlands, The Night-Raven

== Births ==
Death years link to the corresponding "[year] in poetry" article:

- January 5 – Miklós Zrínyi (died 1664), Croatian and Hungarian warrior, statesman and poet
- July 20 – Nikolaes Heinsius (died 1681), Dutch poet and scholar
- Also:
  - Alexander Brome (died 1666), English
  - István Gyöngyösi (died 1704), Hungarian poet
  - Abdul Hakim (died unknown), poet in medieval Bengal
  - Pierre Perrin (died 1675), French poet and libretto composer

== Deaths ==
Birth years link to the corresponding "[year] in poetry" article:

- January 23 (bur.) – Robert Tofte (born 1562), English translator and poet
- February 6 (bur.) – Richard Barnfield (born 1574), English poet
- February 13 – Siôn Phylip (born 1543), Welsh language poet
- February 19 – Roemer Visscher (born 1547), Dutch merchant and writer, especially of epigrams and emblemata
- March 1 – Thomas Campion (born 1567), English composer, poet and physician
- Also: Piotr Kochanowski (born 1566), Polish

== See also ==
- Poetry
- 16th century in poetry
- 16th century in literature
