= Peter Woodhouse =

Peter Woodhouse (fl. 1605) was the writer of a 1605 poem The Flea, with the subsidiary title Democritus, his Dream, or the Contention between the Elephant and the Flea. The poem was printed for John Smethwick, whose shop was in St Dunstan's Churchyard in Fleet Street. In the poem the flea boasts of his superiority to the elephant, since he can enjoy unparalleled erotic access to the body of even the 'coyest dames in Citie or in Court'.
