= François Colletet =

French poet

François Colletet (1628-1680?) was a French poet, the son of the poet Guillaume Colletet. His poetry was considered inferior to that of his father and he was ridiculed by Nicolas Boileau.

== Biography ==
Like his father, he wrote poetry (Les Muses coquettes, 1659[1]; Noëls nouveaux, 1660; Les Tracas de Paris, 1666), but he appears to have been inferior to his father. It is this second Colletet who is mocked by Nicolas Boileau-Despréaux and Gédéon Tallemant des Réaux. He served as an agent in the service of Cardinal Mazarin.

== Works ==
- Noëls nouveaux, 1660
- the Tracas de Paris, 1665
- the Muse coquette, 1665
