= Padmavati (poem) =

1648 epic poem by Alaol

- by Alaol
- Original title: পদ্মাবতী
- Country: Arakan
- Language: Bengali
- Form: epic poem
- Publication date: 1648

Padmavati (Bengali: পদ্মাবতী, romanized: Poddabotī) is an epic poem written in 1648 by Alaol. It is a medieval Bengali poem inspired by the Awadhi poem Padmavat, by Malik Muhammad Jayasi.

The poem focuses on the beautiful princess Padmavati and the attempt of Alauddin Khalji to win her by leading an invasion.

== Plot ==
Blended with folklore and history, the poem is about the marriage of Ratnasimha and Sinhala and the ever-beautiful princess Padmavati of Chittor. However, Alauddin Khalji of the Delhi Sultanate leads an invasion to win her. The Bengali version of the account focuses more on the topic of secular love and less on Sufism, unlike the original. The poem was written under the patronage of Quraishi Magan Thakur. According to this text, Padmini (Padmavati) handed over the responsibility of her two sons to the Sultan, Alauddin before her death by committing jauhar.

== Origin ==
According to Alaol, the people of Roshang wanted to hear the story of Padmavati, which was performed in the Chief Minister, Magan Thakur's assembly. Thakur then ordered Alaol to compose it in Bengali.

== Legacy ==
It inspired a number of novels, plays and poems in 19th-century Bengali literature. It also had Bengali adaptations by Kshirode Prasad Vidyavinode in 1906 and Abanindranath Tagore in 1909.
