= Absalom and Achitophel =

1681 satirical poem by John Dryden

- by John Dryden
- Country: England
- Language: English
- Genre: Satire
- Rhyme scheme: Heroic couplet
- Publication date: 1681

Full text
- Absalom and Achitophel at Wikisource

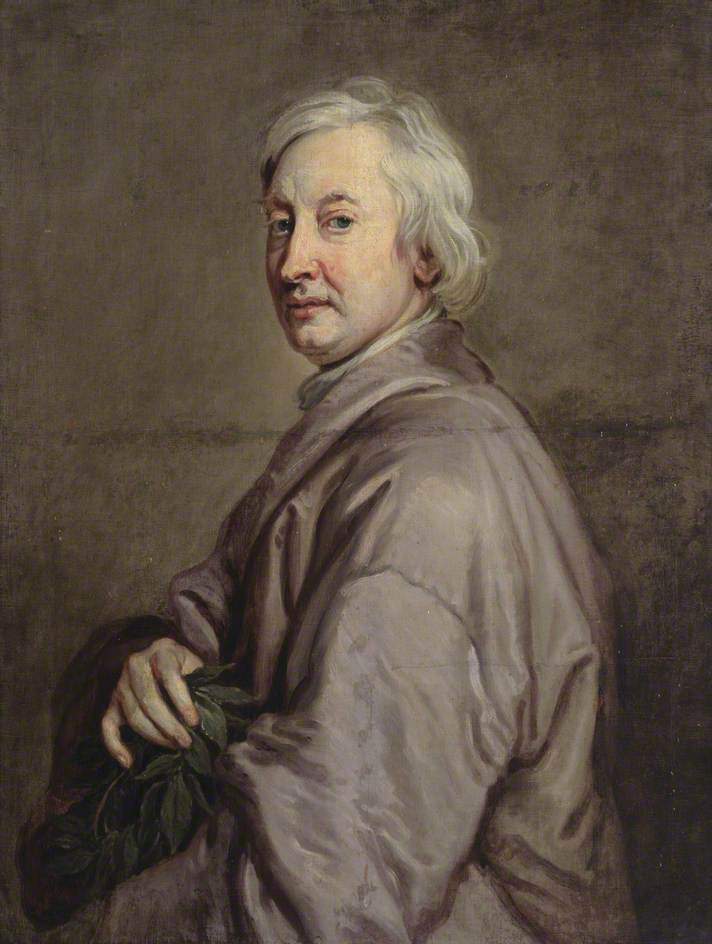
John Dryden by Sir Godfrey Kneller

Absalom and Achitophel is a celebrated satirical poem by John Dryden, written in heroic couplets and first published in 1681. The poem tells the Biblical tale of the rebellion of Absalom against King David; in this context it is an allegory used to represent a story contemporary to Dryden, concerning King Charles II and the Exclusion Crisis (1679–1681). The poem also references the Popish Plot (1678).

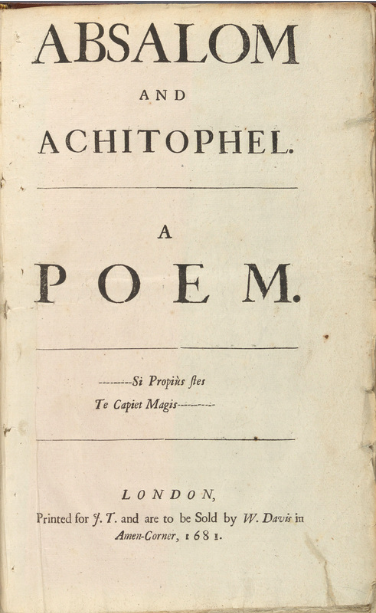
Title page of Absalom and Achitophel, published in 1681. The motto "Si Propius Stes Te Capiet Magis" is from Horace's Ars Poetica; its meaning in English is, "Stand closer, it will charm you more".

== Satire ==
Absalom and Achitophel is "generally acknowledged as the finest political satire in the English language". It is also described as an allegory regarding contemporary political events, and a mock heroic narrative. On the title page, Dryden himself describes it simply as "a poem".

In the prologue, "To the Reader", Dryden states that "the true end of satire is the amendment of vices by correction". He also suggests that in Absalom and Achitophel he did not let the satire be too sharp to those who were least corrupt: "I confess I have laid in for those, by rebating the satire, where justice would allow it, from carrying too sharp an edge."

Absalom and Achitophel has inspired a great deal of discussion regarding satire: how satire was defined when Dryden wrote, and how this poem contrasts with the ancient models of Horace, Virgil, and Juvenal. Dryden himself is considered a father of the modern essay, and one of literature's most important critics of the literary form, particularly in his essay "A Discourse Concerning the Original and Progress of Satire", where he writes a history of satire "from its first rudiments of barbarity, to its last polishing and perfection". He also offers a definition of satire:

Heinsius, in his dissertations on Horace, makes it for me, in these words; "Satire is a kind of poetry, without a series of action, invented for the purging of our minds; in which human vices, ignorance, and errors, and all things besides, which are produced from them, in every man, are severely reprehended; partly dramatically, partly simply, and sometimes in both kinds of speaking; but for the most part figuratively, and occultly; consisting in a low familiar way, chiefly in a sharp and pungent manner of speech; but partly, also, in a facetious and civil way of jesting; by which, either hatred, or laughter, or indignation is moved."

At one point in the essay, "A Discourse Concerning the Original and Progress of Satire", Dryden mentions Absalom and Achitophel:

The nicest and most delicate touches of satire consist in fine raillery … How easy it is to call rogue and villain, and that wittily? But how hard to make a man appear a fool, a blockhead, or a knave, without using any of those opprobrious terms? … The character of Zimri in my Absalom, is, in my opinion, worth the whole poem: 'Tis not bloody, but 'tis ridiculous enough. And he for whom it was intended, was too witty to resent it as an injury … And thus, my lord, you see I have preferred the manner of Horace, and of your Lordship, in this kind of satire, to that of Juvenal.

== Biblical background ==
The story of Absalom's rebellion against his father, King David, is told in the Old Testament of the Bible, in the Second Book of Samuel (chapters 14 to 18). The beautiful Absalom is distinguished by his extraordinarily abundant hair, which is thought to symbolise his pride (2 Sam. 14:26). When David's renowned advisor, Achitophel, joins Absalom's rebellion, another advisor, Hushai, plots with David to pretend to defect and give Absalom advice that plays into David's hands. The result is that Absalom takes the advice of the double agent Hushai over the good advice of Achitophel. Achitophel, realising that the rebellion is doomed to failure, goes home and hangs himself. Absalom is killed (against David's explicit commands) after getting caught by his hair in the thick branches of a great oak tree: "His head caught fast in the oak, and he was left hanging between heaven and earth, while the mule that was under him went on" (NRSV 2 Sam. 18:9). The death of his son, Absalom, causes David enormous personal grief.

A second allegory in the poem, beginning on line 425, is the Parable of the Prodigal Son, which can be found in the New Testament in the Gospel of Luke, chapter 15, verse 11–32. It is the tale of a son who asks for his birthright early, loses it, and returns to his father, who then takes pity on him and shares with him his remaining fortune. The father's forgiveness contrasts with the response of David towards Achitophel, but still the story works well for a theme that deals with problems of ascension, and Dryden uses similarities and differences in the two stories to express the poem's themes. Ideas from this second allegory occur throughout the poem.

== Historical background ==
In 1681 in England, Charles II was aged 51. He had a number of mistresses and had produced a number of illegitimate children. One of these was James Scott, the Duke of Monmouth, who was very popular, both for his personal charisma and for his fervor for the Protestant cause. Charles had no legitimate child to be his heir, and his brother, the future King James II, was openly a Roman Catholic. When Charles's health suffered, there was a panic in the House of Commons over the potential for the nation being ruled by a Roman Catholic king. The Earl of Shaftesbury had sponsored and advocated the Exclusion Bill, which would prevent James from succeeding to the throne, but this bill was blocked by the House of Lords on two occasions. In the spring of 1681, at the Oxford Parliament, Shaftesbury appealed to Charles to legitimise Monmouth. Monmouth was caught preparing to rebel and seek the throne, and Shaftesbury was suspected of fostering this rebellion. The poem was written, possibly at Charles's behest, and published in early November 1681. On 24 November 1681, Shaftesbury was seized and charged with high treason. A trial before a jury picked by Whig sheriffs acquitted him.

Later, after the death of his father, the Duke of Monmouth—unwilling to see his uncle James become King—executed his plans and went into full revolt. The Monmouth Rebellion was put down, and in 1685 the Duke was executed.

== Synopsis ==
Dryden's poem tells the story of the first foment by making Monmouth into Absalom, the beloved boy, Charles into David (who also had done some philandering), and Shaftesbury into Achitophel. It paints Buckingham, an old enemy of Dryden's (see The Rehearsal for one example), into Zimri, the unfaithful servant. The poem places most of the blame for the rebellion on Shaftesbury, and makes Charles a very reluctant and loving man who has to be king before father. The poem also refers to some of the Popish Plot furore.

== Analysis ==
=== Plot analysis ===
There are many different ways of understanding Dryden's poem Absalom and Achitophel. The most common reading compares "the connections between fatherhood and kingship". Through biblical allusions Dryden connects ancient fatherhood with current events not only to show a precedent, but also to show how it connects with a royal's responsibilities. Dryden uses the fatherly indulgence of David (lines 31-33) to explore the legitimacy of Absalom's succession. Dryden uses an old story, The Prodigal Son, to create a clear picture of how self-indulgent love creates unfair conflict. Throughout the poem the relationship of fatherhood and kingship is united.

Another way of reading Dryden's poem is through a "mother plot." Susan Greenfield proposes that the mentions of maternity and women are an important part of the poem's royalist resolution. In this reading the blame is transferred to the females, saying that only the female power of life threatens the political order and should be hindered. It is due to female desires and a female's ability to create life that the whole mess is created.

=== Renaissance element ===
Within the renaissance philosophers and writers were interested in the idea of superiority of bastards. It was a common idea at that time that bastards were better than their legitimate counterparts. Lines 19 and 20 explore this idea when they say "whether, inspired by some diviner lust,/his father got him with a greater gust". It was thought that the greater passion and desire that went into making bastards made them better. An inclusion of this idea in a satirical piece could have many implications. Heidi Kelchner proposes that "we should consider Dryden's reference to the heated manner in which Absalom was conceived-used ironically as part of a mock panegyric of Absalom".

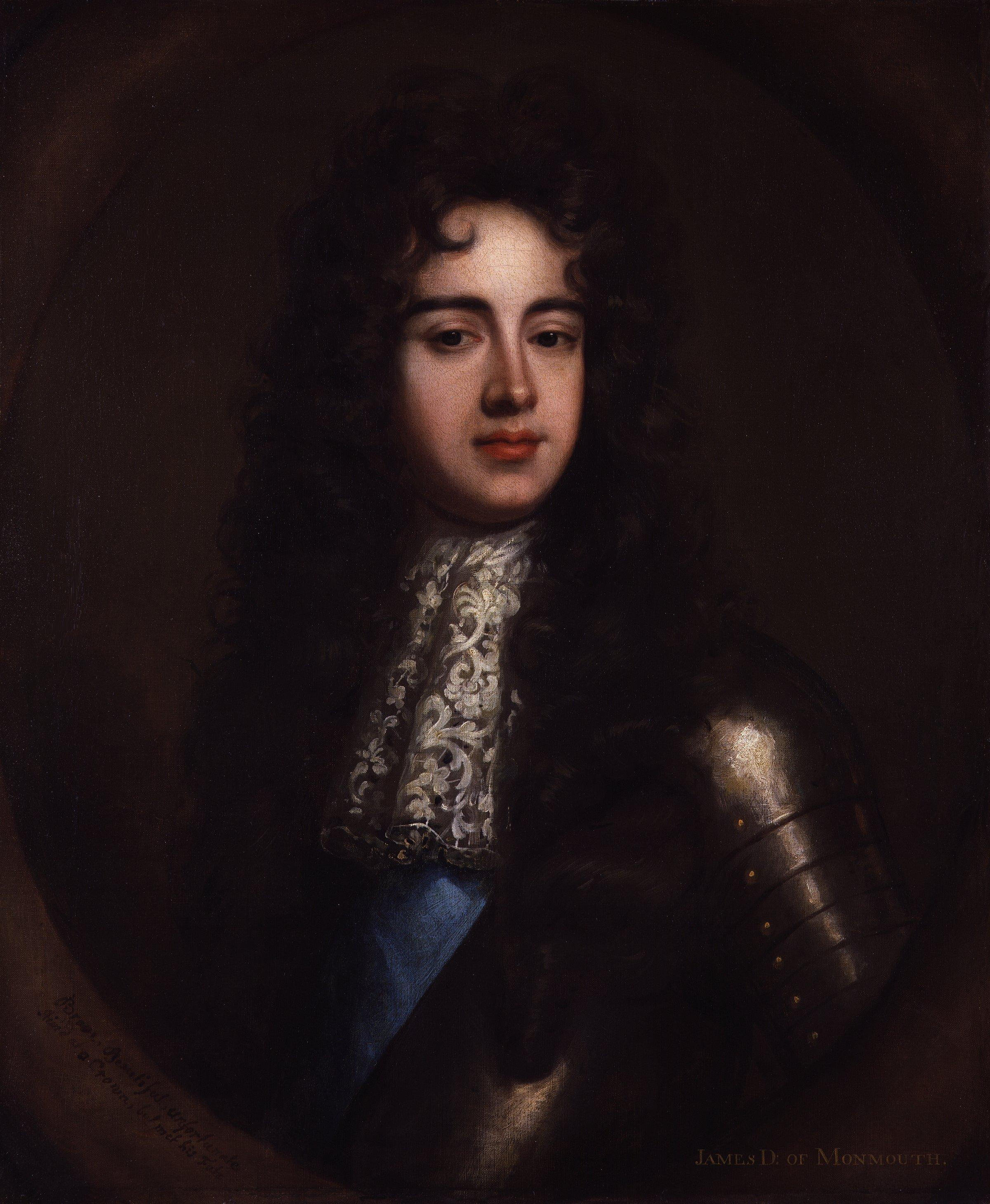
"Absalom"
(James Scott, Duke of Monmouth)

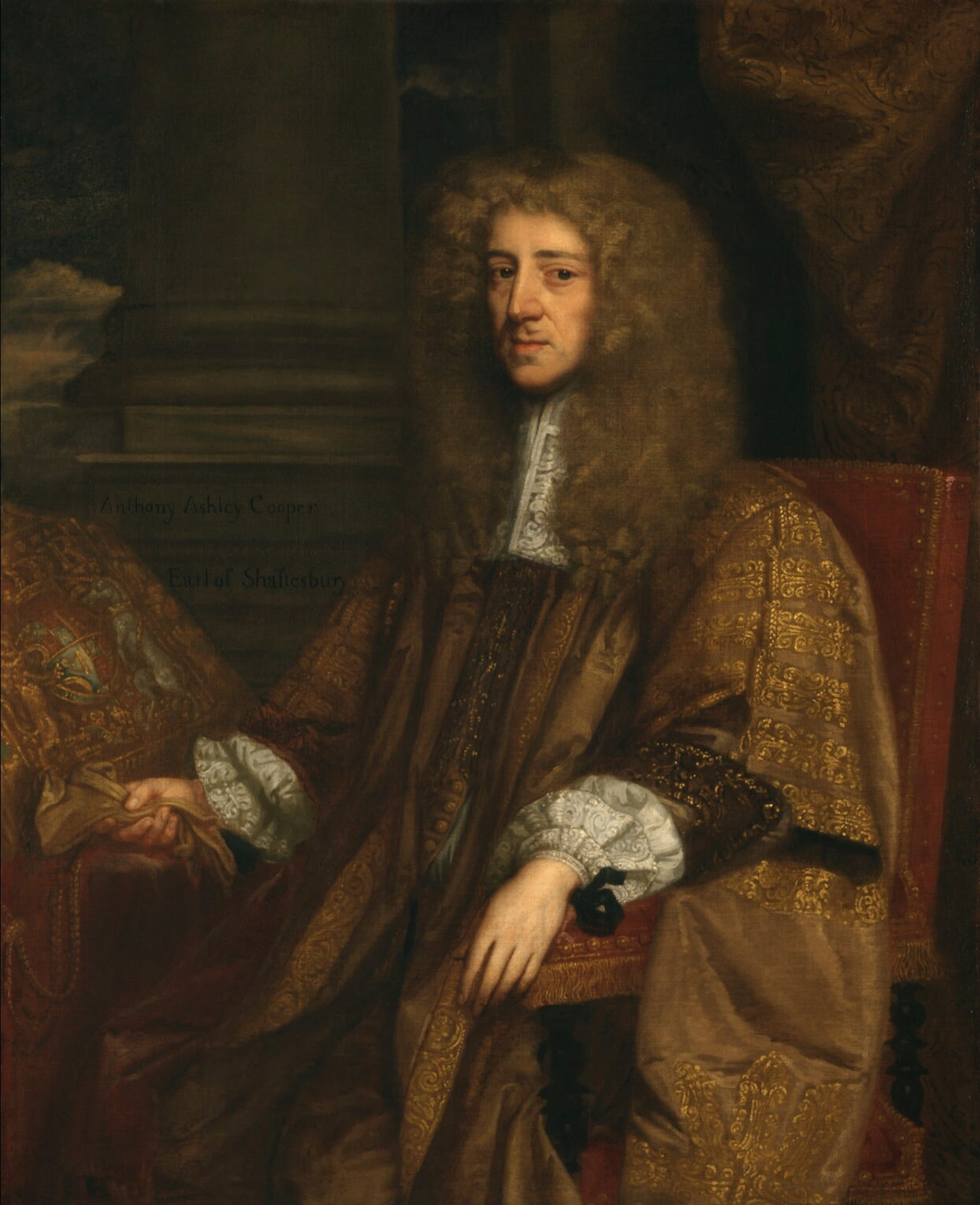
"Achitophel"
(Lord Ashley, Earl of Shaftesbury)

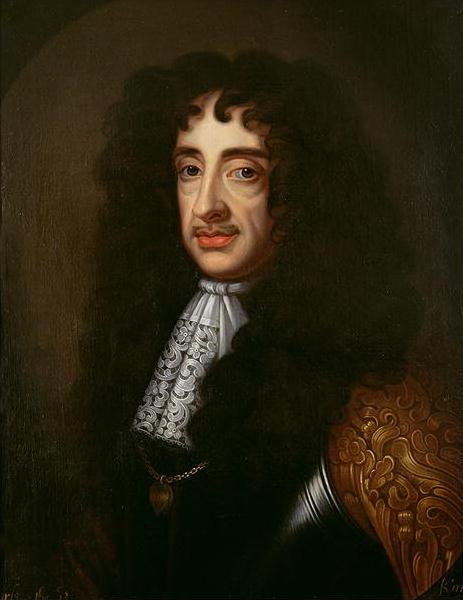
"David"
(Charles II)

== A second part written by Nahum Tate ==
Absalom and Achitophel stands alone as a complete poem by John Dryden as it was published in 1681. Its success led others to encourage Dryden to continue the story, to keep up with current events of the time. Dryden declined the suggestion, but his friend Nahum Tate took it up and wrote a second part, publishing it the following year, 1682. According to the bookseller Jacob Tonson, Tate was aided by Dryden's advice and editorial direction. Dryden also anonymously contributed a few lines that satirized Thomas Shadwell and Elkanah Settle, who in Dryden's passage are named Og and Doeg. Tate's second part recycles a number of Dryden's ideas and lines, but has not impressed the critics, though Dryden's contribution stands out from what surrounds it.

== See also ==
- 1681 in poetry
- 1682 in poetry
- Absalom, Absalom! – the title of William Faulkner's novel is from 2 Sam. 18:33 or 19:4.
