= René Rapin =

French Jesuit and writer

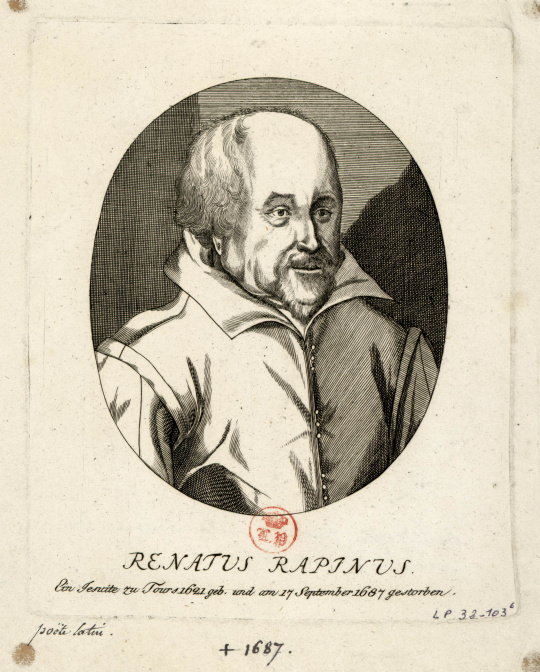

René Rapin (1621–1687) was a French Jesuit and writer.

He was born at Tours and entered the Society of Jesus in 1639. He taught rhetoric, and wrote extensively both in verse and prose.

== Works ==
His first production, Eclogæ Sacræ (Paris, 1659), won him the title of the Second Theocritus, and his poem on gardens, Hortorum libri IV (Paris, 1665), twice translated into English (London, 1673; Cambridge, 1706), placed him among the foremost Latin versifiers. Of his critical essays, the best known are: Observations sur les poèmes d'Homère et de Virgile (Paris, 1669); Réflexions sur l'usage de l'éloquence de ce temps (Paris, 1672); Réflexions sur la poétique d'Aristote et sur les ouvrages des poétes anciens et modernes (Paris, 1674).

He is also the author of several theological and ascetic treatises like De nova doctrina dissertatio seu Evangelium Jansenistarum (Paris, 1656); L'esprit du christianisme (Paris, 1672); La perfection du christianisme (Paris, 1673); La foi des derniers siècles (Paris, 1679). These books and many other pamphlets were collected in Oeuvres complétes published at Amsterdam, 1709–10. Rapin's best titles to celebrity are his two posthumous works: Histoire du jansenisme, edited by Domenech (Paris, 1861), and Mémoires sur l'église, la société, la cour, la ville et le jansénisme, edited by Aubineau (Paris, 1865). The latter book is the counterpart of the Jansenistic Mémoires de Godefroi Hermant sur l'histoire ecclésiastique du XVIIe siècle, edited by Gazier (Paris, 1905). Ste-Beuve in his own Port Royal tries on every occasion to find Rapin at fault, but more recent studies on Jansenism show that he is, in the main, reliable.
