= Marin le Roy de Gomberville =

French poet and novelist

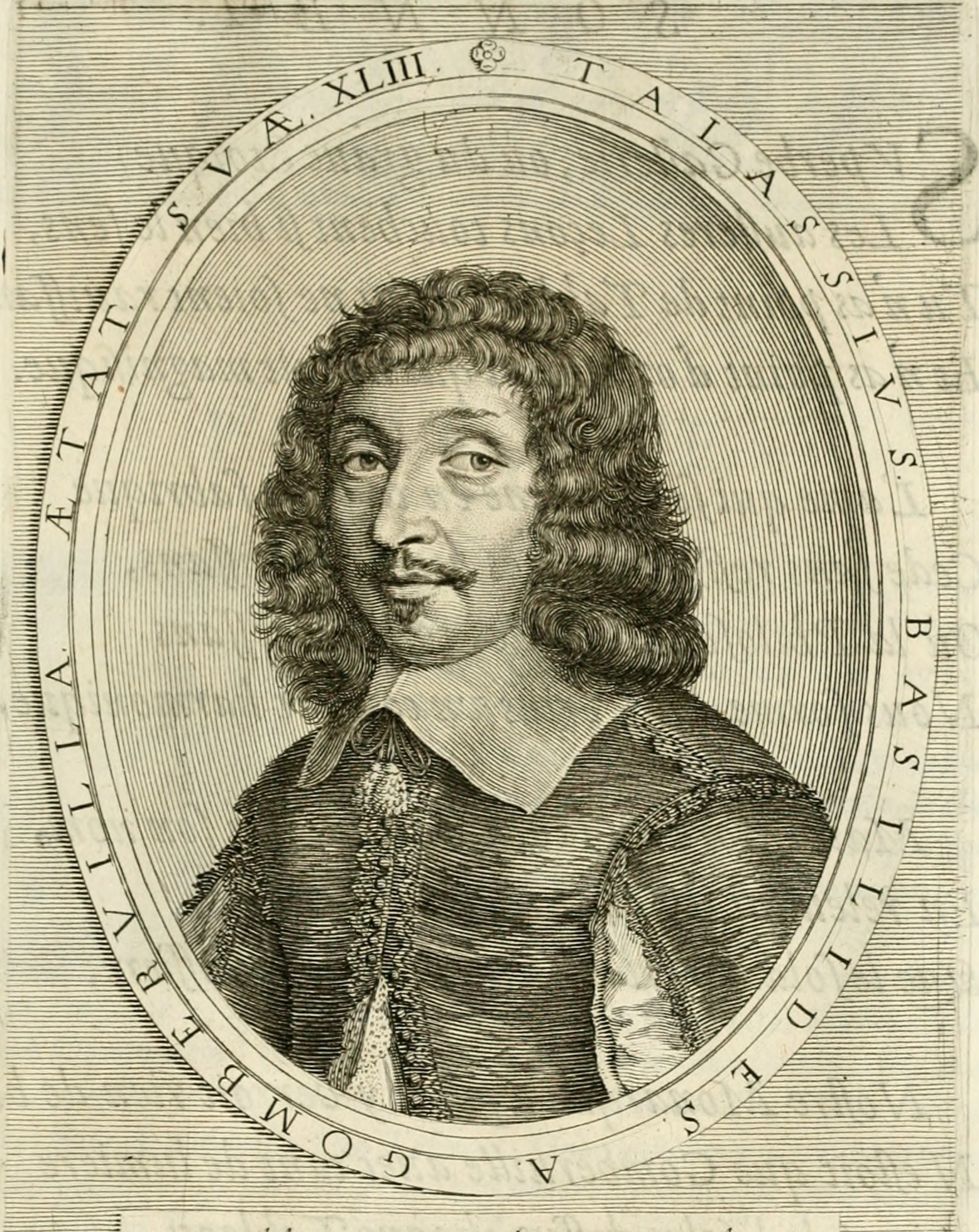
- Born: 1600; Paris, France
- Died: 14 June 1674 (aged 73–74)
- Occupations: Poet and novelist

Marin le Roy, sieur du Parc et de Gomberville (1600 – 14 June 1674) was a French poet and novelist.

He was born at Paris, and at fourteen he produced a volume of poetry. At twenty he wrote his Discours sur l'histoire and at twenty-two a pastoral, La Charité, which is really a novel. The characters, though disguised as shepherds and shepherdesses, represent real people for whose identification the author himself provides a key.

This was followed by a more ambitious work, Polexandre (5 vols. 1632–1637). The hero wanders through the world in search of the island home of the princess Alcidiane. It contains much history and geography; the travels of Polexandre extending to such unexpected places as Benin, the Canary Islands, Mexico and the Antilles, and incidentally we learn all that was then known of Mexican history.

Cythérée (4 vols.) appeared in 1630–1642, and in 1651 the Jeune Alcidiane, intended to undo any harm the earlier novels may have done, for Gomberville became a Jansenist and spent the last twenty-five years of his life in pious retirement. He was one of the earliest and most energetic members of the Académie française.

In 1646, Gomberville published the first edition of his emblem book, La Doctrine des Moeurs ("The Doctrine of Morals") based on Otto van Veen's "Quinti Horatii Flacci Emblemata" [1607]. Later editions appeared in 1681, 1682, 1683, 1684, 1685, and 1688 (all Paris). The illustrations in the first edition, mirror images of van Veen's, were engraved by Pierre Daret.
