= Alaol =

Bengali poet (1607–1680)

Syed Alaol
- সৈয়দ আলাওল
- Born: 1607; Jalalpur,Fatwabad, Bengal Subah, Mughal Empire (now Madaripur District, Bangladesh)
- Died: 1680 (aged 72–73); Court of Majlis Navaraj, Kingdom of Mrauk U (now Rakhine State, Myanmar)
- Occupation: Poet
- Known for: Reviving Persian romantic epics in Bengali literature
- Notable work: Padmavati; Satimayna Lorchandrani; Saptapaykar; Saifulmuluk Badiuzzamal; Sikandarnama; Tohfa; Ragtalnama

Syed Alaol (Bengali: সৈয়দ আলাওল; 1607–1680) was a Bengali poet of the 17th century. He is referred to as a "bard of Middle Bengali literature, and is regarded as one the greatest poets of medieval Bengal. His most famous work, Padmavati, recounts the story of Padmavati, a princess from Ceylon (present-day Sri Lanka). Because his poetry often blended emotion with intellectualism, he earned the title Pandit Kabi (Scholar of Poets). In his honor, a major Bangladeshi literary award—the Alaol Sahitya Puroshkar is named after him.

== Life ==
He was probably born in 1607 in the village of Jalalpur in Fatwabad Pargana (Present Madadipur, Bangladesh) to a minister in the court of Majlis Qutb, the ruler of Fatehabad. He learned Bengali, Arabic, Persian, and Sanskrit languages. Alaol was kidnapped by Portuguese pirates while travelling on a boat with his father and was subsequently taken to Arakan.

Alaol worked as a bodyguard for a while, but his reputation as a poet slowly spread. His talent was first recognised by Magan Thakur, prime minister of King Sanda Thudhamma of the Mrauk-U dynasty of Arakan. He was also patronised by other elders of the court such as chief minister Sulayman, royal minister Syed Musa, army commander Muhammad Khan, and tax minister Majlis Nabaraj.

In 1659, he completed Sati Mayna O Lorchandrani, the first part of which was completed earlier by another Bengali court poet of Arakan, Daulat Qazi. He translated Tohfa at the request of Shrichandra Sudharma or Sanda Thudhamma. Later, Prince Magan Thakur, the foster son of the sister of King Shrichandra Sudharma and co-regent and the prime minister of Arakan, secured him a place in the court of Arakan.

His major work, Padmavati, based on Malik Muhammad Jayasi's Padmavat, was written under the patronage of Magan Thakur. He also began writing the Saifulmuluk Badiuzzamal, an adaptation of a Persian work of the same name during this period. There is a famous poem Prince Saiful Malook and Badri Jamala of the mystic poet of Punjabi literature Mian Muhammad Bakhsh. After the death of Magan Thakur, he received patronage from Saiyad Muhammad Musa, the army chief of King Shrichandra Sudharma. He translated the Haft Peykar from Persian as Saptapaykar in Bengali at his request. In the eulogy of Saptapaykar, Alaol mentioned the arrival of Mughal prince Shah Shuja in Arakan.

In 1659, Shah Shuja took refuge in the court at Arakan. In 1660, after the killing of Shah Shuja, Alaol was also thrown out of the Arakan court because of his closeness with him. According to autobiographical passages in his Sikandarnama, he was initially imprisoned. At this juncture, Sayed Masud Shah, a minister or Qazi of the Arakan king sheltered him. Masud Shah also gave Alaol Khilafat under Qadiriyya Tariqa. Alaol completed his Saifulmuluk Badiuzzamal at his request. He spent his final years at the court of Majlis Navaraj, another minister of Arakan, where he composed his last work—Sikandarnama (according to Ahmed Sharif) or Dara-Sikandar (according to Sukumar Sen)—a Bengali translation of Eskander-nama by the Persian poet Nizami Ganjavi.

His works, apart from Ragtalnama, are adaptations of works in other languages which include:

- Padmavati (1648)
- Satimayna Lorchandrani (completion of Daulat Qazi's work) (1659)
- Saptapaykar (1665)
- Saifulmuluk Badiuzzamal (1669)
- Sikandarnama (1671–72)
- Tohfa (1660)
- Ragtalnama

His poems draw upon his deep engagement with Sufism.

== Legacy ==
An important Bangladeshi literary prize, the Alaol Literary Puroshkar, is named after him. Alaol Hall, a principal male student dormitory at the University of Chittagong in Bangladesh, is named after him.
