= 17th century in literature =

This article contains information about the literary events and publications of 17th century.

== Events and trends ==
- 1605–1615 – Miguel de Cervantes writes the two parts of Don Quixote.
- 1616: April – Death of both William Shakespeare and Miguel de Cervantes.
- 1630-1651: William Bradford writes Of Plymouth Plantation, journals that are considered the most authoritative account of the Pilgrims and their government.
- 1660–1669 – Samuel Pepys writes his diary which not only covers his life but also the daily and historic events in London during his time.
- 1667–68 – Marianna Alcoforado writes her Letters of a Portuguese Nun.
- 1671–1696 – Madame de Sévigné writes her famous letters.
- Metaphysical poets - a term made by Samuel Johnson for a group of 17th century English poets.
- German literature of the Baroque period

== New books and plays ==
1600

- Hamlet, Prince of Denmark by William Shakespeare
- England's Helicon (anthology) – including work by Edmund Spenser, Michael Drayton, Thomas Lodge, Philip Sidney and others
- Old Fortunatus – Thomas Dekker
- The Spanish Moor's Tragedy – Thomas Dekker, John Marston, and William Haughton

1601

- Twelfth Night, or What You Will by William Shakespeare
- Cynthia's Revels – Ben Jonson
- Disputationes Metaphysicae by Francisco Suárez first published
- Satiromastix – Thomas Dekker

1602

- Rymes by Lope de Vega
- Troilus and Cressida by William Shakespeare
- Antonio and Mellida (play) – John Marston
- Mirum in Modum (poetry) – John Davies of Hereford
- Satiromastix (play) – Thomas Dekker and John Marston
- A Survey of Cornwall – Richard Carew

1603

- The True Law of Free Monarchies by King James VI and I
- Ane Godlie Dreame (poem) by Elizabeth Melville published in Edinburgh
- Measure for Measure by William Shakespeare
- Othello by William Shakespeare
- The Tragical History of Doctor Faustus by Christopher Marlowe (published)

1604

- All's Well That Ends Well by William Shakespeare
- The Honest Whore (play) – Thomas Dekker
- The Malcontent (play) – John Marston

1605

- Timon of Athens by William Shakespeare
- The Dutch Courtesan (play) – John Marston
- The Tragedy of Philotas (play) – Samuel Daniel
- The Tragedy of King Lear by William Shakespeare
- Don Quixote (El Ingenioso Hidalgo Don Quijote de la Mancha), Part I – Miguel de Cervantes
- Epistle concerning the Excellencies of the English Tongue – Richard Carew

1606

- Macbeth by William Shakespeare
- Antony and Cleopatra by William Shakespeare

1607

- A Woman Killed with Kindness (play) – Thomas Heywood
- Bussy D'Ambois (play) – George Chapman
- Michaelmas Terme (play) – Thomas Middleton
- The Knight of the Burning Pestle (play) – Francis Beaumont
- The Famous History of Sir Thomas Wyatt (play) – Thomas Dekker and John Webster
- The Legend of Great Cromwell – Michael Drayton
- Pericles, Prince of Tyre by William Shakespeare
- The Revenger's Tragedy by Thomas Middleton

1608

- Coriolanus by William Shakespeare
- A Nest of Ninnies – Robert Armin
- Humour out of Breathe (play) – John Day
- The Belman of London (play) – Thomas Dekker
- The Merry Devil of Edmonton (play) – anonymous; has been attributed to William Shakespeare, Michael Drayton and others.

1609

- The Winter's Tale by William Shakespeare
- Jerusalem Conquered (epic poem) by Lope de Vega
- Fourre Birds of Noahs Arke – Thomas Dekker

1610

- Sidereus Nuncius by Galileo Galilei
- Cymbeline by William Shakespeare
- The Faithful Shepherdess (play) – John Fletcher

1611

- Fuente Ovejuna (play) – Lope de Vega
- The Authorized Version (King James version) of the Bible
- The Tempest by William Shakespeare
- Catiline his Conspiracy (play) – Ben Jonson
- The Roaring Girle (play) – Thomas Dekker and Thomas Middleton

1612

- Four Soluloquies – Lope de Vega
- El comendador de Ocaña (Ocaña's mayor) – Lope de Vega
- A Woman is a Weather-Cocke – Nathan Field

1613

- Soledades – Luis de Góngora
- La dama boba (the fool lady) – Lope de Vega
- The Dog in the Manger (play) – Lope de Vega
- Henry VIII by William Shakespeare
- Tears on the Death of Moeliades – William Drummond of Hawthornden
- The Revenge of Bussy D'Ambois – George Chapman
- Purchas, his Pilgrimage; or, Relations of the World and the Religions observed in all Ages – Samuel Purchas

1614

- Bartholomew Fair (play) – Ben Jonson
- La Lira by Giambattista Marino
- Fama fraternitatis Roseae Crucis oder Die Bruderschaft des Ordens der Rosenkreuzer – Johannes Valentinus Andreae

1615

- Don Quixote, Part II – Miguel de Cervantes
- El caballero de Olmedo (The knight from Olmedo) (play) – Lope de Vega
- Confessio oder Bekenntnis der Societät und Bruderschaft Rosenkreuz – Johannes Valentinus Andreae

1616

- Ben Jonson's Works
- The Whole Works of Homer – George Chapman
- Chymische Hochzeit Christiani Rosencreutz Anno 1459 – Johannes Valentinus Andreae
- Rollo, Duke of Normandy (also known as The Bloody Brother) (?1616–30?) – John Fletcher, Ben Jonson, Philip Massinger, George Chapman (The drinking song)

1617

- Warenar (play) by Pieter Corneliszoon Hooft
- A Faire Quarrell (play) – Thomas Middleton and William Rowley

1618

- History of Tythes – John Selden
- Amends for Ladies (play) – Nathan Field

1619

- A King and No King (play) – Beaumont and Fletcher
- The Maid's Tragedy (play) – Beaumont and Fletcher
- The Shoemaker's Holiday – Thomas Deloney
- The Custome of the Countrey – John Fletcher and Philip Massinger
- Reipublicae Christianopolitanae descriptio – Johannes Valentinus Andreae

1620

- Philaster – Beaumont and Fletcher

1621

- The Anatomy of Melancholy – Robert Burton
- Women Beware Women – Thomas Middleton
- El vergonzoso en palacio – Tirso de Molina
- The Countess of Montgomery's Urania – Lady Mary Wroth

1623

- The Heir (play) – Thomas May
- The Historie of the Raigne of King Henry the Seventh – Francis Bacon
- The French Disease – Richard Brome
- The Beggar's Bush – John Fletcher
- El tejedor de Segovia – Juan Ruiz de Alarcón
- The Changeling – Thomas Middleton and William Rowley text

1623

- L'Adone by Giambattista Marino
- Love, honour and power (play) – Pedro Calderón de la Barca
- The Duchess of Malfi – John Webster
- First Folio – William Shakespeare

1624

- Circe (poem) bu Lope de Vega
- Nero Caesar, or Monarchie Depraved – Edmund Bolton
- The Sun's Darling – John Ford

1625

- De jure belli ac pacis by Hugo Grotius
- Complete Essays – Francis Bacon
- Les Bergeries – Racan

1626

- El Buscón – Francisco de Quevedo

1627

- England's schim (play) – Pedro Calderón de la Barca
- The Bataile of Agincourt – Michael Drayton
- First Steps up Parnassus – Michael Drayton

1628

- Microcosmographie – John Earle

1629

- The Roman Actor (play) – Philip Massinger
- La Dama Duende (play) – Pedro Calderón de la Barca
- The Tragedy of Albovine (play) – William D'Avenant

1630

- The Conceited Pedlar – Thomas Randolph

1631

- The punishment without vengeance (play) – Lope de Vega

1632

- L'Allegro – John Milton
- La Dorotea – Lope de Vega
- The Fatal Dowry (play) – Nathan Field and Philip Massinger
- Dialogue Concerning the Two Chief World Systems by Galileo Galilei
- The Muses' Looking-Glass by Thomas Randolph

1633

- A New Way to Pay Old Debts (play) – Philip Massinger
- Love's Sacrifice (play) – John Ford
- The Gamester (play) – James Shirley
- The Temple (poetry) – George Herbert

1634

- Tottenham Court (play) – Thomas Nabbes

1636

- Life is a dream (play) – Pedro Calderón de la Barca
- Le Cid (play) – Pierre Corneille

1637

- La Vega del Parnaso (Parnasos' river bank) – Lope de Vega
- Discourse on the Method – René Descartes

1638

- Two New Sciences by Galileo Galilei
- Alcione (play) – Pierre du Ryer

1639

- Argalus and Parthenia (play) – Henry Glapthorne
- The City Match – Jasper Mayne

1640

- Horace (play) – Pierre Corneille
- The Bay Psalm Book, the first book printed in North America
- Joseph's partly-coloured Coat – Thomas Fuller

1641

- Meditations on First Philosophy – René Descartes
- Episcopacy by Divine Right – Joseph Hall
- The Cardinall (play) – James Shirley (first extant edition, 1652)
- A Joviall Crew (play) – Richard Brome (first extant edition, 1652)

1642

- September: Playhouses closed in England by government order.
- Religio Medici Sir Thomas Browne
- Saul (play) by Pierre du Ryer

1644

- Principles of Philosophy – René Descartes
- Areopagitica by John Milton

1646

- Andronicus or the Unfortunate Politician – Thomas Fuller
- Pseudodoxia Epidemica or Vulgar Errors – Sir Thomas Browne

1647

- Philosophical Poems – Henry More

1648

- The Amorous War – Jasper Mayne
- Hesperides by Robert Herrick (poet)
- Padmavati – Alaol (in Bengali)

1649

- Eikon Basilike – John Gauden

1650

- Silex scintillans – Henry Vaughan

1651

- El alcalde de Zalamea – Pedro Calderón de la Barca
- Leviathan – Thomas Hobbes
- Reliquiae Wottonianiae – Sir Henry Wotton (posthumous)
- Jeune Alcidiane – Marin le Roy de Gomberville

1652

- Brief Character of the Low Countries – Owen Feltham
- Theophilia or Love's Sacrifice (poetry) – Edward Benlowes
- The Cardinall (play) – James Shirley

1653

- A History of New England – Edward Johnson
- The Compleat Angler – Izaak Walton
- Poems and Fancies – Margaret Cavendish
- The Princess Cloria – Percy Herbert, 2nd Baron Powis

1654

- Lucifer (play) – Joost van den Vondel
- Parlhenissa, a novel – Roger Boyle, 1st Earl of Orrery

1655

- L'Étourdi ou les Contretemps first play by Molière

1656

- El gran teatro del mundo (World's great theatre) (play) – Pedro Calderón de la Barca
- Nature's Pictures – Margaret Cavendish
- Oceana by James Harrington

1657

- Guárdate del agua mansa (Keep out from silent waters) – Pedro Calderón de la Barca
- Katharina von Georgien (play) by Andreas Gryphius

1658

- Hydriotaphia, Urn Burial – Sir Thomas Browne
- The Garden of Cyrus -Sir Thomas Browne

1659

- Sati Mayna O Lorchandrani – Alaol (in Bengali)
- Lucasta – Richard Lovelace (posthumous)
- Pharonnida – William Chamberlayne

1660

- Tohfa – Alaol (in Bengali)

1661

- Elementa jurisprudentiae universalis libri duo by Samuel von Pufendorf

1662

- A new edition of the Book of Common Prayer of the Church of England (this edition remains the officially authorised book to the present day).

1664

- La Thébaïde (play) – Jean Racine

1665

- Alexandre le Grand (Alexander the Great) (play) – Jean Racine
- Memoires of François Bassompierre (posthumous)
- Saptapaykar – Alaol (in Bengali)

1666

- Grace Abounding to the Chief of Sinners by John Bunyan

1667

- Paradise Lost by John Milton
- Andromaque by Jean Racine
- Annus Mirabilis, the Year of Wonders 1666 – John Dryden
- Secret Love (play) – John Dryden

1668

- Le Tartuffe – Molière
- The Miser – Molière
- Simplicius Simplicissimus – Hans Jakob Christoffel von Grimmelshausen
- Cyprianus Anglicanus – Peter Heylin
- Essay of Dramatick Poesie – John Dryden
- Observations upon Experimental Philosophy – Margaret Cavendish

1669

- Saifulmuluk O Badiujjamal – Alaol (in Bengali)

1670

- Pensées by Blaise Pascal
- The Conquest of Granada – John Dryden

1671

- Madame de Sévigné writes her first letter
- Samson Agonistes – John Milton
- The Rehearsal (play) – George Villiers, 2nd Duke of Buckingham performed
- Sikandarnama – Alaol (in Bengali)

1672

- Bajacet (play) by Jean Racine
- Marriage à la mode by John Dryden
- The Rehearsal (play) by George Villiers, 2nd Duke of Buckingham published

1674

- Iphigénie (play) by Jean Racine
- The Tragedy of Nero, Emperour of Rome (play) – Nathaniel Lee

1675

- The Country Wife by William Wycherley
- Gerania; a New Discovery of a Little Sort of People, anciently discoursed of, called Pygmies by Joshua Barnes

1676

- The Man of Mode (play) – George Etherege
- English-Adventures by a Person of Honor – Roger Boyle, 1st Earl of Orrery

1677

- Phèdre – Jean Racine
- Treatise of the Art of War – Roger Boyle, 1st Earl of Orrery

1678

- All for Love – John Dryden
- The True Intellectual System of the Universe – Ralph Cudworth
- The Pilgrim's Progress by John Bunyan
- Threnodia Carolina – Sir Thomas Herbert

1679

- Anima Mundi – Charles Blount

1680

- The Life and Death of Mr Badman – John Bunyan

1681

- Miscellaneous Poems by Andrew Marvell (posthumous)
- Absalom and Achitophel by John Dryden

1682

- The Life of an Amorous Man (好色一代男, Kōshoku Ichidai Otoko) by Ihara Saikaku

1685

- Five Women Who Loved Love (好色五人女, Kōshoku Gonin Onna) by Ihara Saikaku

1686

- The Life of an Amorous Woman (好色一代女, Kōshoku Ichidai Onna) by Ihara Saikaku

1687

- Philosophiæ Naturalis Principia Mathematica - Isaac Newton
- The Hind and the Panther – John Dryden
- The Hind and the Panther Transversed to the Story of the Country and the City Mouse – Matthew Prior
- Bellamira, or The Mistress (play) – Sir Charles Sedley
- The Great Mirror of Male Love (The Encyclopedia of Male Love) (男色大鑑, Nanshoku Okagami) by Ihara Saikaku

1688

- The Eternal Storehouse of Japan (日本永代蔵, Nippon Eitaigura) by Ihara Saikaku

1689

- The Massacre of Paris (play) – Nathaniel Lee
- Table Talk – John Selden (posthumous)

1690

- Amphitryon, or the Two Socias – John Dryden
- An Essay Concerning Human Understanding – John Locke
- Memoires of the Navy by Samuel Pepys

1691

- Athalie (play) – Jean Racine

1692

- Reckonings that Carry Men Through the World or This Scheming World (世間胸算用, Seken Munazan'yō) by Ihara Saikaku

1693

- The Impartial Critick – John Dennis

1694

- The Fatal Marriage (play) – Thomas Southerne

1696

- Louis de Rouvroy, Duc de Saint-Simon starts writings his Memoirs

1697

- A New Voyage Round the World – William Dampier

1698

- The Campaigners (play) – Thomas D'Urfey

1699

- Dialogues of the Dead – William King and Charles Boyle

== Translations ==
- The Bible - translated into Italian by Giovanni Diodati
- Don Quixote - translated into Italian by Lorenzo Franciosini
- Euclid's Elements - translated into Chinese by Xu Guangqi
- Hayy ibn Yaqdhan by Ibn Tufail – translated into Latin by Edward Pococke the Younger, translated into Dutch by Johannes Bouwmeester, and translated into English by George Ashwell
- The works of Tacitus - translated into Italian by Adriano Politi

== Births ==
- 1600 – Marin le Roy de Gomberville
- 1601 – Baltasar Gracián
- 1602 – Jean-Jacques Boissard
- 1603 – Pierre Corneille
- 1605 – Thomas Browne
- 1607 – Francisco de Rojas Zorrilla
- 1608 – Padre António Vieira/ John Milton
- 1609 – Jean Rotrou
- 1611 – William Cartwright; Thomas Urquhart
- 1613 – John Cleveland
- 1615 – Tanneguy Lefebvre
- 1617 – Ralph Cudworth
- 1620 – Lucy Hutchinson
- 1621 – Hans Jakob Christoph von Grimmelshausen
- 1622 – Molière
- 1623 – Blaise Pascal
- 1625 – Thomas Corneille
- 1626 – Marie de Rabutin-Chantal, marquise de Sévigné
- 1627 – John Flavel
- 1628 – Miguel de Molinos
- 1630 – Isaac Barrow
- 1631 – John Dryden
- 1632 – John Locke
- 1632 – Baruch Spinoza
- 1633 – Samuel Pepys
- 1639 – Thomas Ellwood
- 1640 – Aphra Behn
- 1642 – Isaac Newton
- 1643 – Gilbert Burnet
- 1644 – Matsuo Bashō
- 1646 – Gottfried Leibniz
- 1648 – Robert Barclay
- 1651 – William Dampier
- 1652 – Thomas Otway
- 1657 – Bernard le Bovier de Fontenelle
- 1667 – Jonathan Swift
- 1668 – Alain-René Lesage
- 1675 – Louis de Rouvroy, duc de Saint-Simon
- 1681 – Robert Keith
- 1685 – George Berkeley
- 1689 – Samuel Richardson
- 1694 – Voltaire
- 1698 – Metastasio

== Deaths ==
- 1600 – Richard Hooker (theologian)
- 1605 – John Stow
- 1607 – Sir Edward Dyer
- 1612 – Juan de la Cueva; Robert Armin
- 1615 – Mateo Alemán
- 1616 – William Shakespeare; Miguel de Cervantes; Francis Beaumont; Richard Hakluyt
- 1621 – Guillaume du Vair
- 1623 – William Camden
- 1624 – Stephen Gosson
- 1625 – John Fletcher; Thomas Lodge
- 1626 – Lancelot Andrewes; Samuel Purchas
- 1627 – Luis de Góngora
- 1631 – Michael Drayton; Guillén de Castro y Bellvis
- 1633 – Abraham Fraunce
- 1634 – George Chapman
- 1635 – Lope de Vega; Thomas Randolph; Richard Corbet; John Hall (son-in-law of Shakespeare)
- 1638 – Robert Aytoun
- 1639 – Juan Ruiz de Alarcón
- 1640 – Philip Massinger; Robert Burton
- 1641 – Augustine Baker
- 1643 – William Cartwright
- 1644 – Luis Vélez de Guevara; Francis Quarles
- 1645 – Francisco de Quevedo; William Lithgow
- 1647 – Francis Meres
- 1648 – Tirso de Molina; Alonso de Castillo Solórzano; George Abbot; Vincent Voiture
- 1650 – René Descartes
- 1658 – Baltasar Gracián; Pierre du Ryer
- 1660 – Thomas Urquhart
- 1661 – María de Zayas y Sotomayor
- 1662 – François le Métel de Boisrobert
- 1667 – Georges de Scudéry
- 1672 – Anne Bradstreet; Tanneguy Lefebvre
- 1673 – Molière
- 1674 – Marin le Roy de Gomberville
- 1676 – Hans Jakob Christoph von Grimmelshausen
- 1678 – Andrew Marvell
- 1679 – Thomas Hobbes
- 1681 – Pedro Calderón de la Barca
- 1682 – Thomas Browne
- 1685 – Thomas Otway
- 1688 – John Bunyan; Ralph Cudworth
- 1689 – Aphra Behn
- 1691 – Richard Baxter; John Flavel
- 1696 – Miguel de Molinos; Madame de Sévigné

== See also ==
- 17th century in poetry
- German literature of the Baroque period
- French literature of the 17th century
- Early Modern English literature
- Baroque literature
- Early Modern literature
- 16th century in literature
- 1700 in literature
- 18th century in literature
- list of years in literature

== Sources ==
- The First Half of the Seventeenth Century (1906) by Herbert J. C. Grierson. Periods of European Literature series, vol. 7. George Edward Bateman Saintsbury, ed. Edinburgh and London: William Blackwood and Sons.
