= Restoration literature =

Literature written during the English restoration

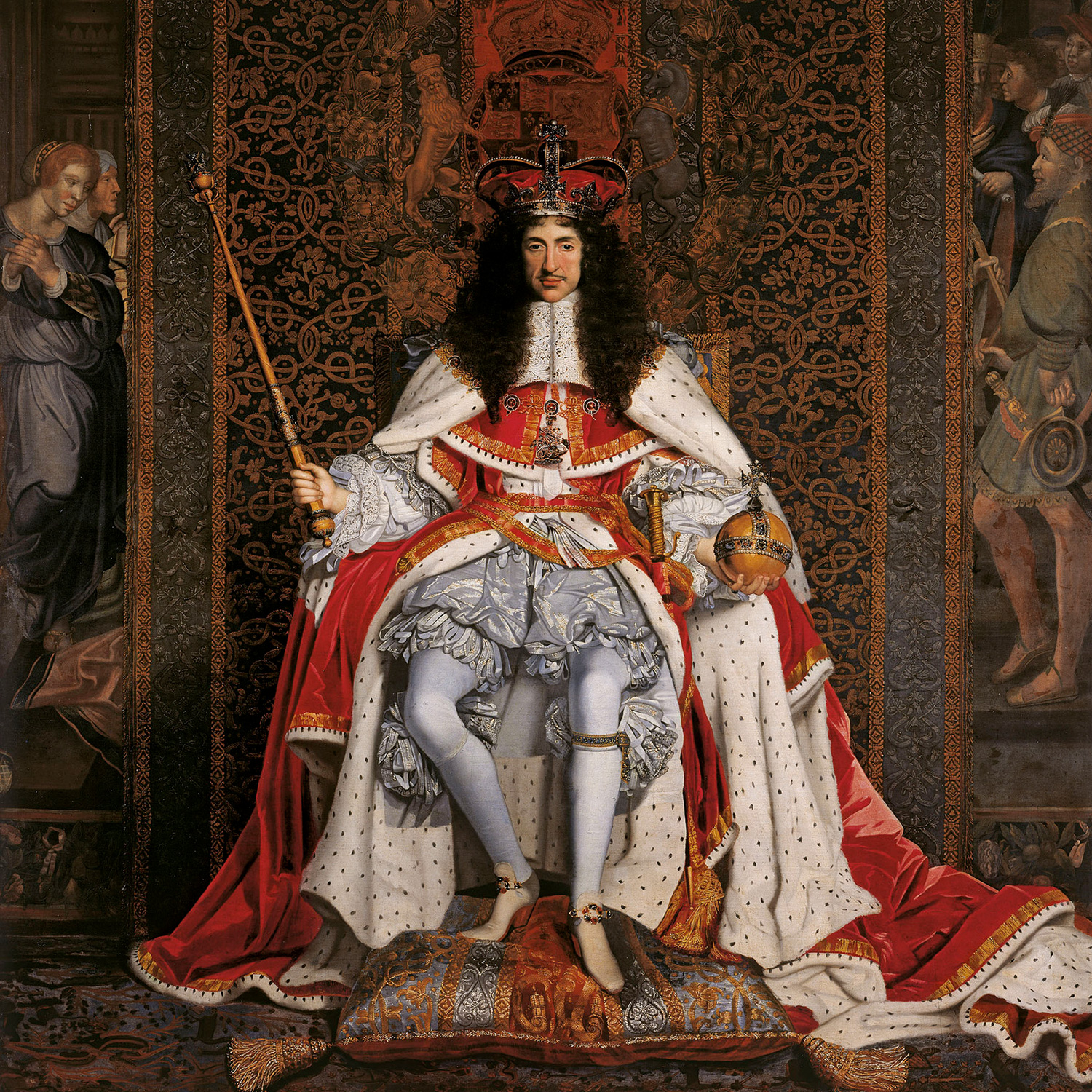
The English monarchy was restored when Charles II of England (above) became king in 1660.

Restoration literature is the English literature written during the historical period commonly referred to as the English Restoration (1660–1688), which corresponds to the last years of Stuart reign in England, Scotland, Wales, and Ireland. In general, the term is used to denote roughly homogeneous styles of literature that centre on a celebration of or reaction to the restored court of Charles II. It is a literature that includes extremes, for it encompasses both Paradise Lost and the Earl of Rochester's Sodom, the high-spirited sexual comedy of The Country Wife and the moral wisdom of The Pilgrim's Progress. It saw Locke's Treatises of Government, the founding of the Royal Society, the experiments and holy meditations of Robert Boyle, the hysterical attacks on theatres from Jeremy Collier, and the pioneering of literary criticism from John Dryden and John Dennis. The period witnessed news becoming a commodity, the essay developing into a periodical art form, and the beginnings of textual criticism.

The dates for Restoration literature are a matter of convention, and they differ markedly from genre to genre. Thus, the "Restoration" in drama may last until 1700, while in poetry it may last only until 1666 (see 1666 in poetry) and the annus mirabilis; and in prose it might end in 1688, with the increasing tensions over succession and the corresponding rise in journalism and periodicals, or not until 1700, when those periodicals grew more stabilized. In general, scholars use the term "Restoration" to denote the literature that began and flourished under Charles II, whether that literature was the laudatory ode that gained a new life with restored aristocracy, the eschatological literature that showed an increasing despair among Puritans, or the literature of rapid communication and trade that followed in the wake of England's mercantile empire.

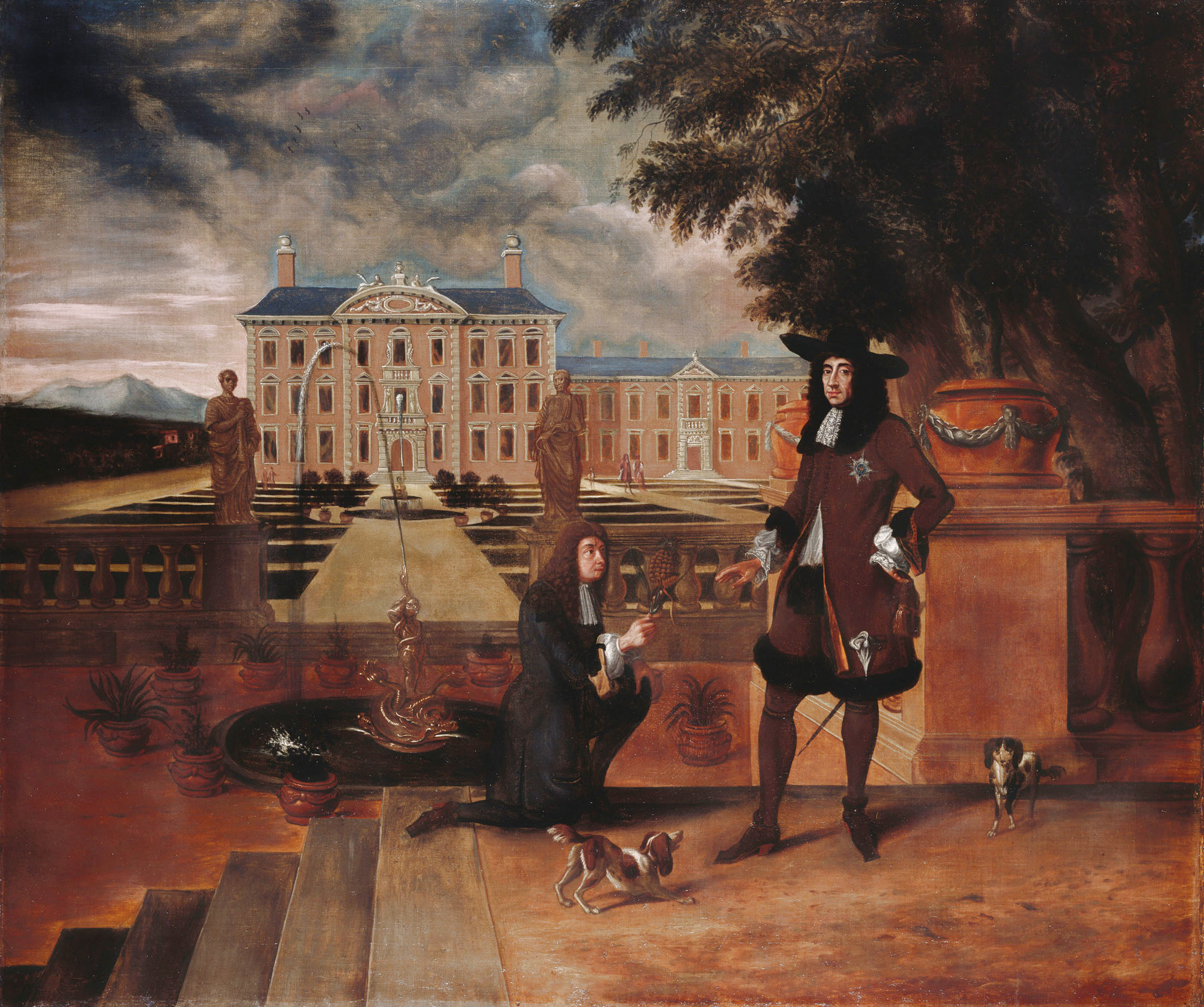
Charles II being given the first pineapple grown in England by his gardener, John Rose; note also the Cavalier King Charles Spaniels in the foreground

== Historical context ==
During the Interregnum, England had been dominated by Puritan literature and the intermittent presence of official censorship (for example, Milton's Areopagitica and his later retraction of that statement). While some of the Puritan ministers of Oliver Cromwell wrote poetry that was elaborate and carnal (such as Andrew Marvell's poem, "To His Coy Mistress"), such poetry was not published. Similarly, some of the poets who published with the Restoration produced their poetry during the Interregnum. The official break in literary culture caused by censorship and radically moralist standards effectively created a gap in literary tradition. At the time of the Civil War, poetry had been dominated by metaphysical poetry of the John Donne, George Herbert, and Richard Lovelace sort. Drama had developed the late Elizabethan theatre traditions and had begun to mount increasingly topical and political plays (for example, the drama of Thomas Middleton). The Interregnum put a stop, or at least a caesura, to these lines of influence and allowed a seemingly fresh start for all forms of literature after the Restoration.

The last years of the Interregnum were turbulent, as were the last years of the Restoration period, and those who did not go into exile were called upon to change their religious beliefs more than once. With each religious preference came a different sort of literature, both in prose and poetry (the theatres were closed during the Interregnum). When Cromwell died and his son, Richard Cromwell, threatened to become Lord Protector, politicians and public figures scrambled to show themselves as allies or enemies of the new regime. Printed literature was dominated by odes in poetry, and religious writing in prose. The industry of religious tract writing, despite official efforts, did not reduce its output. Figures such as the founder of the Society of Friends, George Fox, were jailed by the Cromwellian authorities and published at their own peril.

During the Interregnum, the royalist forces attached to the court of Charles I went into exile with the twenty-year-old Charles II and conducted a brisk business in intelligence and fund-raising for an eventual return to England. Some of the royalist ladies installed themselves in convents in Holland and France that offered safe haven for indigent and travelling nobles and allies. The men similarly stationed themselves in Holland and France, with the court-in-exile being established in The Hague before setting up more permanently in Paris. The nobility who travelled with (and later travelled to) Charles II were therefore lodged for more than a decade in the midst of the continent's literary scene. As Holland and France in the 17th century were little alike, so the influences picked up by courtiers in exile and the travellers who sent intelligence and money to them were not monolithic. Charles spent his time attending plays in France, and he developed a taste for Spanish plays. Those nobles living in Holland began to learn about mercantile exchange as well as the tolerant, rationalist prose debates that circulated in that officially tolerant nation. John Bramhall, for example, had been a strongly high church theologian, and yet, in exile, he debated willingly with Thomas Hobbes and came into the Restored church as tolerant in practice as he was severe in argument. Courtiers also received an exposure to the Roman Catholic Church and its liturgy and pageants, as well as, to a lesser extent, Italian poetry.

=== Initial reaction ===
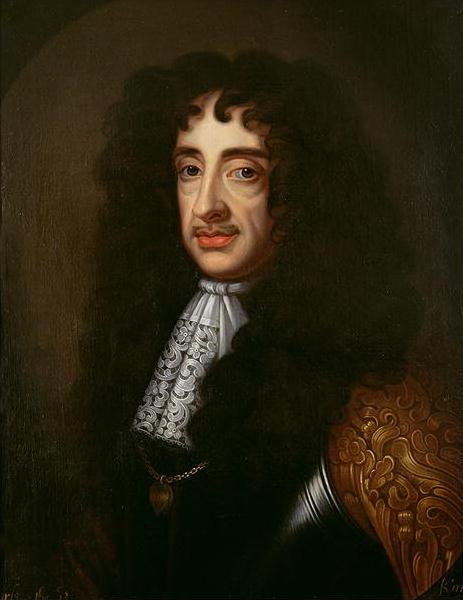
Charles II

When Charles II became king in 1660, the sense of novelty in literature was tempered by a sense of suddenly participating in European literature in a way that England had not before. One of Charles's first moves was to reopen the theatres and to grant letters patent giving mandates for the theatre owners and managers. Thomas Killigrew received one of the patents, establishing the King's Company and opening the first patent theatre at the Theatre Royal, Drury Lane; Sir William Davenant received the other, establishing the Duke's Company and opening his patent theatre in Lincoln's Inn Fields. Drama was public and a matter of royal concern, and therefore both theatres were charged with producing a certain number of old plays, and Davenant was charged with presenting material that would be morally uplifting. Additionally, the position of Poet Laureate was recreated, complete with payment by a barrel of "sack" (Spanish white wine), and the requirement for birthday odes.

Charles II was a man who prided himself on his wit and his worldliness. He was well known as a philanderer as well. Highly witty, playful, and sexually wise poetry thus had court sanction. Charles and his brother James, the Duke of York and future King of England, also sponsored mathematics and natural philosophy, and so spirited scepticism and investigation into nature were favoured by the court. Charles II sponsored the Royal Society, which courtiers were eager to join (for example, the noted diarist Samuel Pepys was a member), just as Royal Society members moved in court. Charles and his court had also learned the lessons of exile. Charles was High Church (and secretly vowed to convert to Roman Catholicism on his death) and James was crypto-Catholic, but royal policy was generally tolerant of religious and political dissenters. While Charles II did have his own version of the Test Act, he was slow to jail or persecute Puritans, preferring merely to keep them from public office (and therefore to try to rob them of their Parliamentary positions). As a consequence, the prose literature of dissent, political theory, and economics increased in Charles II's reign.

Authors moved in two directions in reaction to Charles's return. On the one hand, there was an attempt at recovering the English literature of the Jacobean period, as if there had been no disruption; but, on the other, there was a powerful sense of novelty, and authors approached Gallic models of literature and elevated the literature of wit (particularly satire and parody). The novelty would show in the literature of sceptical inquiry, and the Gallicism would show in the introduction of Neoclassicism into English writing and criticism.

=== Top-down history ===
The Restoration is an unusual historical period, as its literature is bounded by a specific political event: the restoration of the Stuart monarchy. It is unusual in another way, as well, for it is a time when the influence of that king's presence and personality permeated literary society to such an extent that, almost uniquely, literature reflects the court. The adversaries of the restoration, the Puritans and democrats and republicans, similarly respond to the peculiarities of the king and the king's personality. Therefore, a top-down view of the literary history of the Restoration has more validity than that of most literary epochs. "The Restoration" as a critical concept covers the duration of the effect of Charles and Charles's manner. This effect extended beyond his death, in some instances, and not as long as his life, in others.

== Poetry ==
The Restoration was an age of poetry. Not only was poetry the most popular form of literature, but it was also the most significant form of literature, as poems affected political events and immediately reflected the times. It was, to its own people, an age dominated only by the king, and not by any single genius. Throughout the period, the lyric, ariel, historical, and epic poem was being developed.

=== The English epic ===
Even without the introduction of Neo-classical criticism, English poets were aware that they had no national epic. Edmund Spenser's Faerie Queene was well known, but England, unlike France with The Song of Roland or Spain with the Cantar de Mio Cid or, most of all, Italy with the Aeneid, had no epic poem of national origins. Several poets attempted to supply this void.

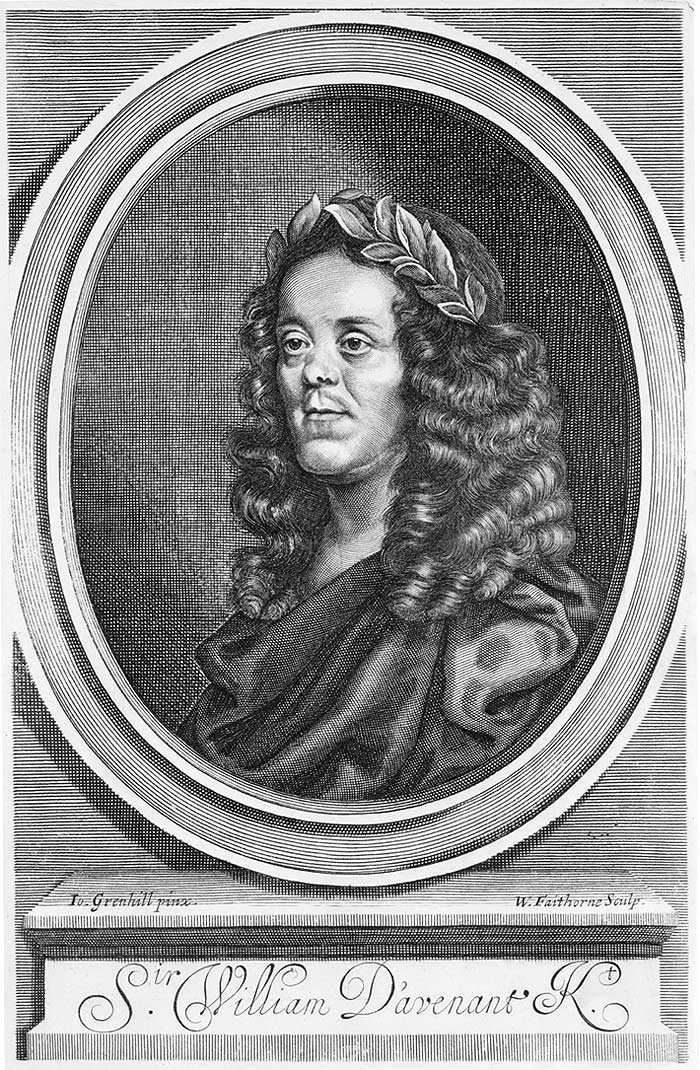
Sir William Davenant, operator of the first playhouse opened after the Restoration, was also a playwright and an epic poet.

Sir William Davenant was the first Restoration poet to attempt an epic. His unfinished Gondibert was of epic length, and it was admired by Hobbes. However, it also used the ballad form, and other poets, as well as critics, were very quick to condemn this rhyme scheme as unflattering and unheroic (Dryden Epic). The prefaces to Gondibert show the struggle for a formal epic structure, as well as how the early Restoration saw themselves in relation to Classical literature.

Although today he is studied separately from the Restoration period, John Milton's Paradise Lost was published during that time. Milton no less than Davenant wished to write the English epic, and chose blank verse as his form. Milton rejected the cause of English exceptionalism: his Paradise Lost seeks to tell the story of all mankind, and his pride is in Christianity rather than Englishness.

Significantly, Milton began with an attempt at writing an epic on King Arthur, for that was the matter of English national founding. While Milton rejected that subject, in the end, others made the attempt. Richard Blackmore wrote both a Prince Arthur and King Arthur. Both attempts were long and soporific, and failed both critically and popularly. Indeed, the poetry was so slow that the author became known as "Never-ending Blackmore" (see Alexander Pope's lambasting of Blackmore in The Dunciad).

The Restoration period ended without an English epic. Beowulf may now be called the English epic, but the work was unknown to Restoration authors, and Old English was incomprehensible to them.

=== Poetry, verse, and odes ===
Lyric poetry, in which the poet speaks of his or her own feelings in the first person and expresses a mood, was not especially common in the Restoration period. Poets expressed their points of view in other forms, usually public or formally disguised poetic forms such as odes, pastoral poetry, and ariel verse. One of the characteristics of the period is its devaluation of individual sentiment and psychology in favour of public utterance and philosophy. The sorts of lyric poetry found later in the Churchyard Poets would, in the Restoration, only exist as pastorals.

Formally, the Restoration period had a preferred rhyme scheme. Rhyming couplets in iambic pentameter was by far the most popular structure for poetry of all types. Neo-Classicism meant that poets attempted adaptations of Classical meters, but the rhyming couplet in iambic pentameter held a near monopoly. According to Dryden ("Preface to The Conquest of Granada"), the rhyming couplet in iambic pentameter has the right restraint and dignity for a lofty subject, and its rhyme allowed for a complete, coherent statement to be made. Dryden was struggling with the issue of what later critics in the Augustan period would call "decorum": the fitness of form to subject (q.v. Dryden Epic). It is the same struggle that Davenant faced in his Gondibert. Dryden's solution was a closed couplet in iambic pentameter that would have a minimum of enjambment. This form was called the "heroic couplet," because it was suitable for heroic subjects. Additionally, the age also developed the mock-heroic couplet. After 1672 and Samuel Butler's Hudibras, iambic tetrameter couplets with unusual or unexpected rhymes became known as Hudibrastic verse. It was a formal parody of heroic verse, and it was primarily used for satire. Jonathan Swift would use the Hudibrastic form almost exclusively for his poetry.

Although Dryden's reputation is greater today, contemporaries saw the 1670s and 1680s as the age of courtier poets in general, and Edmund Waller was as praised as any. Dryden, Rochester, Buckingham, and Dorset dominated verse, and all were attached to the court of Charles. Aphra Behn, Matthew Prior, and Robert Gould, by contrast, were outsiders who were profoundly royalist. The court poets follow no one particular style, except that they all show sexual awareness, a willingness to satirise, and a dependence upon wit to dominate their opponents. Each of these poets wrote for the stage as well as the page. Of these, Behn, Dryden, Rochester, and Gould deserve some separate mention.

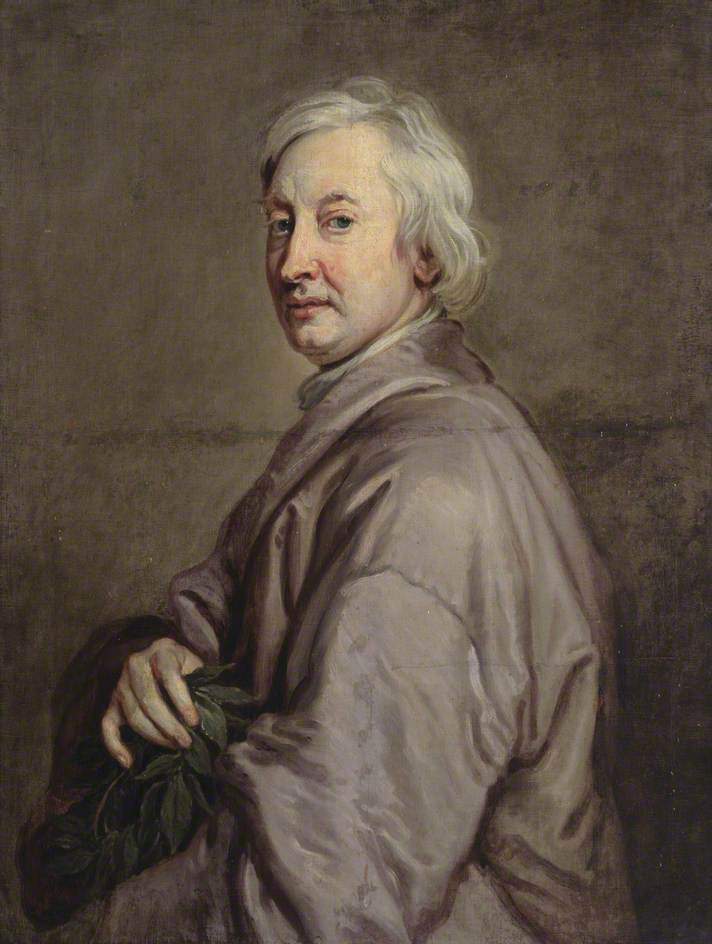
John Dryden

Dryden was prolific; and he was often accused of plagiarism. Both before and after his Laureateship, he wrote public odes. He attempted the Jacobean pastoral along the lines of Walter Raleigh and Philip Sidney, but his greatest successes and fame came from his attempts at apologetics for the restored court and the Established Church. His Absalom and Achitophel and Religio Laici both served the King directly by making controversial royal actions seem reasonable. He also pioneered the mock-heroic. Although Samuel Butler had invented the mock-heroic in English with Hudibras (written during the Interregnum but published in the Restoration), Dryden's MacFlecknoe set up the satirical parody. Dryden was himself not of noble blood, and he was never awarded the honours that he had been promised by the King (nor was he repaid the loans he had made to the King), but he did as much as any peer to serve Charles II. Even when James II came to the throne and Roman Catholicism was on the rise, Dryden attempted to serve the court, and his The Hind and the Panther praised the Roman church above all others. After that point, Dryden suffered for his conversions, and he was the victim of many satires.

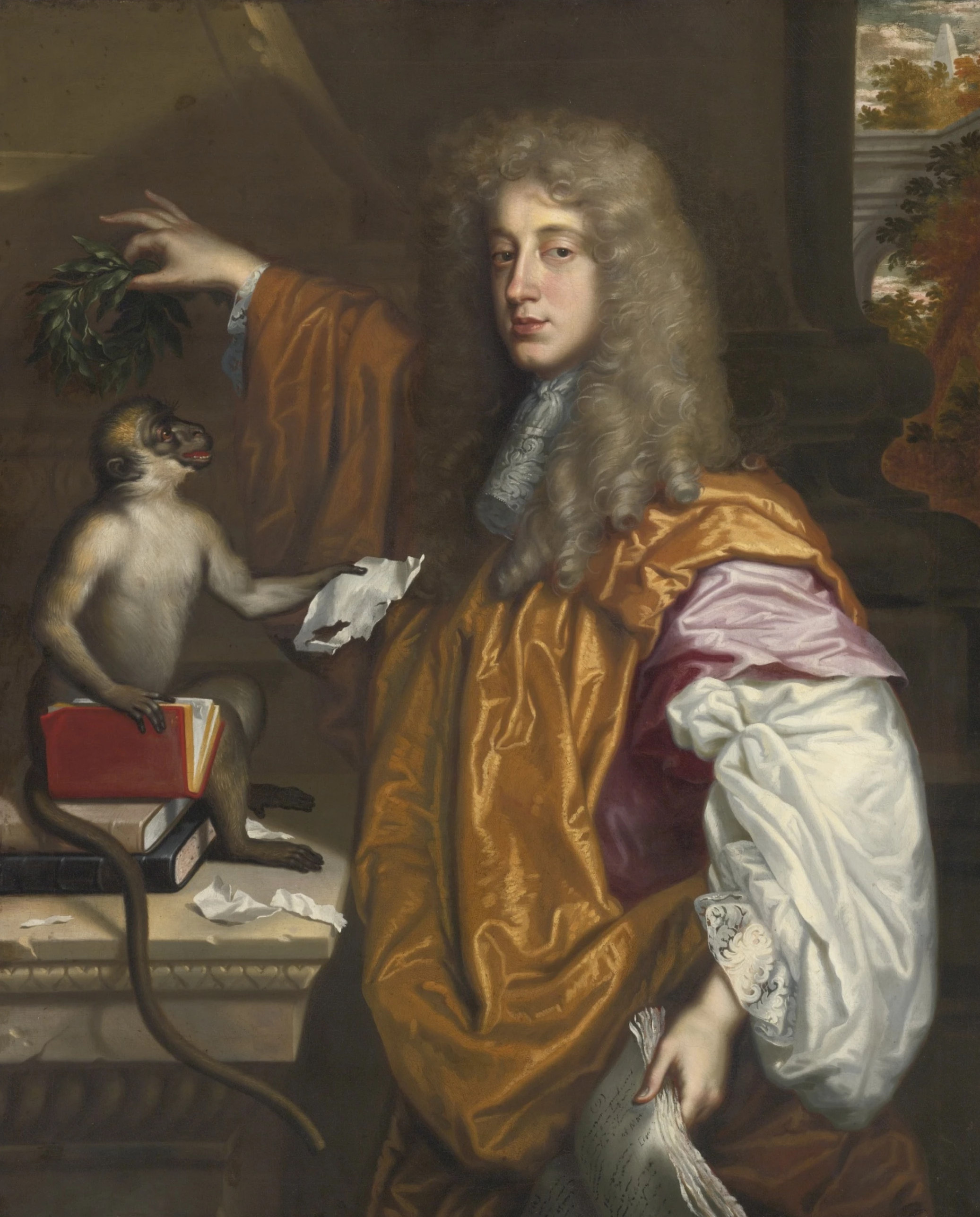
The Earl of Rochester, famous as the model rake. Not long before his death, by Jacob Huysmans

Buckingham wrote some court poetry, but he, like Dorset, was a patron of poetry more than a poet. Rochester, meanwhile, was a prolix and outrageous poet. Rochester's poetry is almost always sexually frank and is frequently political. Inasmuch as the Restoration came after the Interregnum, the very sexual explicitness of Rochester's verse was a political statement and a thumb in the eye of Puritans. His poetry often assumes a lyric pose, as he pretends to write in sadness over his own impotence ("The Disabled Debauchee") or sexual conquests, but most of Rochester's poetry is a parody of an existing, Classically authorised form. He has a mock topographical poem ("Ramble in St James Park", which is about the dangers of darkness for a man intent on copulation and the historical compulsion of that plot of ground as a place for fornication), several mock odes ("To Signore Dildo," concerning the public burning of a crate of "contraband" from France on the London docks), and mock pastorals. Rochester's interest was in inversion, disruption, and the superiority of wit as much as it was in hedonism. Rochester's venality led to an early death, and he was later frequently invoked as the exemplar of a Restoration rake.

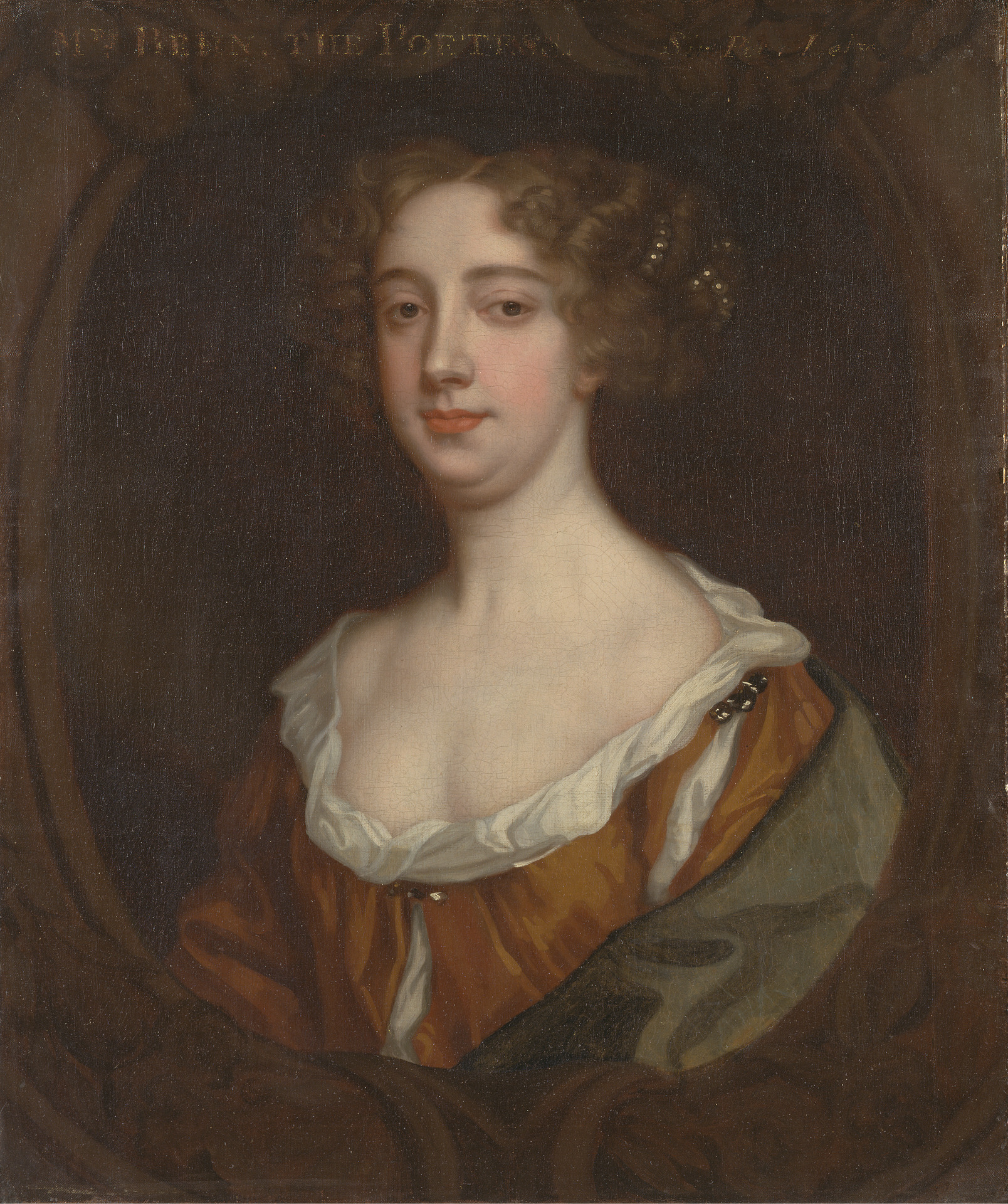
Aphra Behn, the first professional female novelist in English.

Aphra Behn modelled the rake Willmore in her play The Rover on Rochester; and while she was best known publicly for her drama (in the 1670s, only Dryden's plays were staged more often than hers), Behn wrote a great deal of poetry that would be the basis of her later reputation. Edward Bysshe would include numerous quotations from her verse in his Art of English Poetry (1702). While her poetry was occasionally sexually frank, it was never as graphic or intentionally lurid and titillating as Rochester's. Rather, her poetry was, like the court's ethos, playful and honest about sexual desire. One of the most remarkable aspects of Behn's success in court poetry, however, is that Behn was herself a commoner. She had no more relation to peers than Dryden, and possibly quite a bit less. As a woman, a commoner, and Kentish, she is remarkable for her success in moving in the same circles as the King himself. As Janet Todd and others have shown, she was likely a spy for the Royalist side during the Interregnum. She was certainly a spy for Charles II in the Second Anglo-Dutch War, but found her services unrewarded (in fact, she may have spent time in debtor's prison) and turned to writing to support herself. Her ability to write poetry that stands among the best of the age gives some lie to the notion that the Restoration was an age of female illiteracy and verse composed and read only by peers.

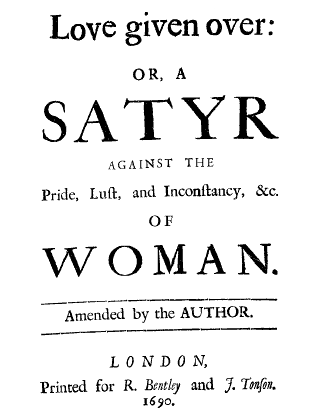
Title page to Robert Gould's 1690 Love Given O'er, the "Satire on Woman"

If Behn is a curious exception to the rule of noble verse, Robert Gould breaks that rule altogether. Gould was born of a common family and orphaned at the age of thirteen. He had no schooling at all and worked as a domestic servant, first as a footman and then, probably, in the pantry. However, he was attached to the Earl of Dorset's household, and Gould somehow learned to read and write, as well as possibly to read and write Latin. In the 1680s and 1690s, Gould's poetry was very popular. He attempted to write odes for money, but his great success came with Love Given O'er, or A Satyr Upon ... Woman in 1692. It was a partial adaptation of a satire by Juvenal, but with an immense amount of explicit invective against women. The misogyny in this poem is some of the harshest and most visceral in English poetry: the poem sold out all editions. Gould also wrote a Satyr on the Play House (reprinted in Montagu Sommers's The London Stage) with detailed descriptions of the actions and actors involved in the Restoration stage. He followed the success of Love Given O'er with a series of misogynistic poems, all of which have specific, graphic, and witty denunciations of female behaviour. His poetry has "virgin" brides who, upon their wedding nights, have "the straight gate so wide/ It's been leapt by all mankind," noblewomen who have money but prefer to pay the coachman with oral sex, and noblewomen having sex in their coaches and having the cobblestones heighten their pleasures. Gould's career was brief, but his success was not a novelty of subliterary misogyny. After Dryden's conversion to Roman Catholicism, Gould even engaged in a poison pen battle with the Laureate. His "Jack Squab" (the Laureate getting paid with squab as well as sack and implying that Dryden would sell his soul for a dinner) attacked Dryden's faithlessness viciously, and Dryden and his friends replied. That a footman even could conduct a verse war is remarkable. That he did so without, apparently, any prompting from his patron is astonishing.

=== Translations and controversialists ===
Roger L'Estrange (per above) was a significant translator, and he also produced verse translations. Others, such as Richard Blackmore, were admired for their "sentence" (declamation and sentiment) but have not been remembered. Also, Elkannah Settle was, in the Restoration, a lively and promising political satirist, though his reputation has not fared well since his day. After booksellers began hiring authors and sponsoring specific translations, the shops filled quickly with poetry from hirelings. Similarly, as periodical literature began to assert itself as a political force, a number of now anonymous poets produced topical, specifically occasional verse.

The largest and most important form of incunabula of the era was satire. There were great dangers in being associated with satire and its publication was generally done anonymously. To begin with, defamation law cast a wide net, and it was difficult for a satirist to avoid prosecution if he were proven to have written a piece that seemed to criticise a noble. More dangerously, wealthy individuals would often respond to satire by having the suspected poet physically attacked by ruffians. The Earl of Rochester hired such thugs to attack John Dryden suspected of having written An Essay on Satire. A consequence of this anonymity is that a great many poems, some of them of merit, are unpublished and largely unknown. Political satires against The Cabal, against Sunderland's government, and, most especially, against James II's rumoured conversion to Roman Catholicism, are uncollected. However, such poetry was a vital part of the vigorous Restoration scene, and it was an age of energetic and voluminous satire.

== Prose genres ==
Prose in the Restoration period is dominated by Christian religious writing, but the Restoration also saw the beginnings of two genres that would dominate later periods: fiction and journalism. Religious writing often strayed into political and economic writing, just as political and economic writing implied or directly addressed religion.

=== Philosophical writing ===
The Restoration saw the publication of a number of significant pieces of political and philosophical writing that had been spurred by the actions of the Interregnum. Additionally, the court's adoption of Neo-classicism and empirical science led to a receptiveness toward significant philosophical works.

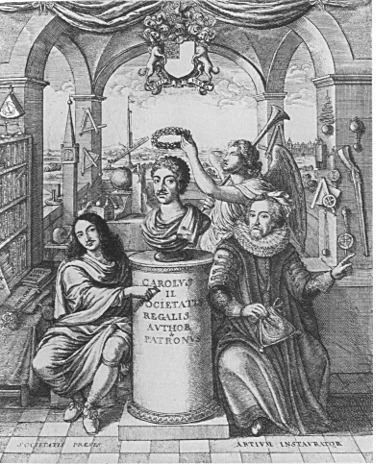
Frontispiece to Thomas Sprat's History of the Royal Society, 1667

Thomas Sprat wrote his History of the Royal Society in 1667 and set forth, in a single document, the goals of empirical science ever after. He expressed grave suspicions of adjectives, nebulous terminology, and all language that might be subjective. He praised a spare, clean, and precise vocabulary for science and explanations that are as comprehensible as possible. In Sprat's account, the Royal Society explicitly rejected anything that seemed like scholasticism. For Sprat, as for a number of the founders of the Royal Society, science was Protestant: its reasons and explanations had to be comprehensible to all. There would be no priests in science, and anyone could reproduce the experiments and hear their lessons. Similarly, he emphasised the need for conciseness in description, as well as reproducibility of experiments.

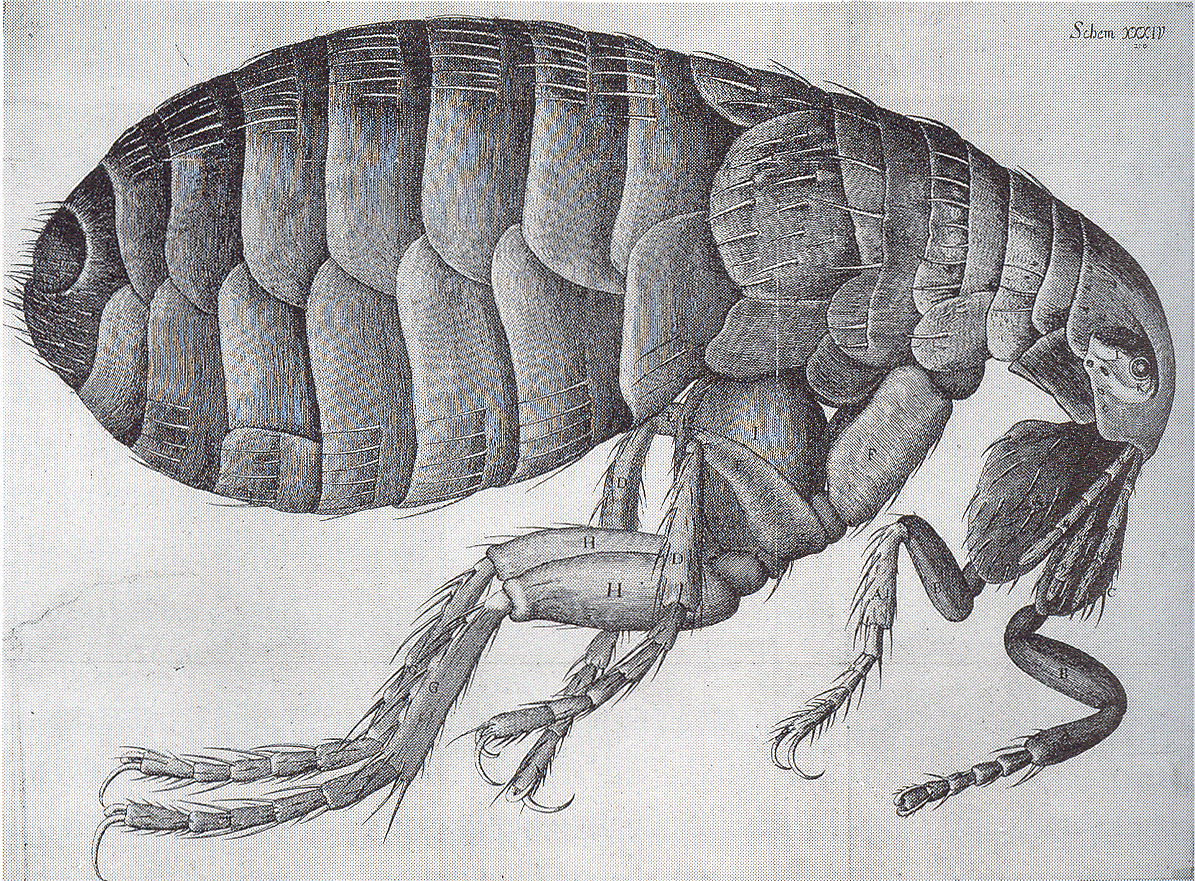
Image of a flea from Robert Hooke's Micrographia (1665), a Royal Society work

William Temple, after he retired from being what today would be called Secretary of State, wrote several bucolic prose works in praise of retirement, contemplation, and direct observation of nature. He also brought the Ancients and Moderns quarrel into English with his Reflections on Ancient and Modern Learning. The debates that followed in the wake of this quarrel would inspire many of the major authors of the first half of the 18th century (most notably Swift and Alexander Pope).

The Restoration was also the time when John Locke wrote many of his philosophical works. Locke's empiricism was an attempt at understanding the basis of human understanding itself and thereby devising a proper manner for making sound decisions. These same scientific methods led Locke to his Two Treatises of Government, which later inspired the thinkers in the American Revolution. As with his work on understanding, Locke moves from the most basic units of society toward the more elaborate, and, like Thomas Hobbes, he emphasises the plastic nature of the social contract. For an age that had seen absolute monarchy overthrown, democracy attempted, democracy corrupted, and limited monarchy restored; only a flexible basis for government could be satisfying.

=== Religious writing ===
The Restoration moderated most of the more strident sectarian writing, but radicalism persisted after the Restoration. Puritan authors such as John Milton were forced to retire from public life or adapt, and those Diggers, Fifth Monarchist, Leveller, Quaker, and Anabaptist authors who had preached against monarchy and who had participated directly in the regicide of Charles I were partially suppressed. Consequently, violent writings were forced underground, and many of those who had served in the Interregnum attenuated their positions in the Restoration.

Fox, and William Penn, made public vows of pacifism and preached a new theology of peace and love. Other Puritans contented themselves with being able to meet freely and act on local parishes. They distanced themselves from the harshest sides of their religion that had led to the abuses of Cromwell's reign. Two religious authors stand out beyond the others in this time: John Bunyan and Izaak Walton.

Bunyan's The Pilgrim's Progress is an allegory of personal salvation and a guide to the Christian life. Instead of any focus on eschatology or divine retribution, Bunyan instead writes about how the individual saint can prevail against the temptations of mind and body that threaten damnation. The book is written in a straightforward narrative and shows influence from both drama and biography, and yet it also shows an awareness of the allegorical tradition found in Edmund Spenser.

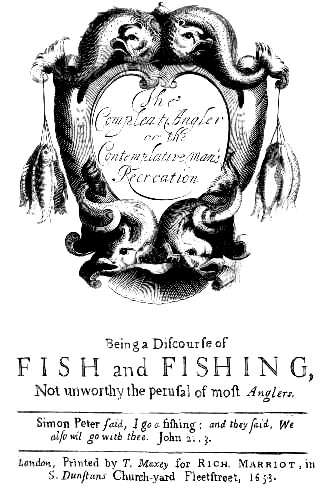
Title page to Walton's The Compleat Angler, or the Contemplative man's Recreation

Izaak Walton's The Compleat Angler is similarly introspective. Ostensibly, his book is a guide to fishing, but readers treasured its contents for their descriptions of nature and serenity. There are few analogues to this prose work. On the surface, it appears to be in the tradition of other guide books (several of which appeared in the Restoration, including Charles Cotton's The Compleat Gamester, which is one of the earliest attempts at settling the rules of card games), but, like Pilgrim's Progress, its main business is guiding the individual.

More court-oriented religious prose included sermon collections and a great literature of debate over the convocation and issues before the House of Lords. The Act of First Fruits and Fifths, the Test Act, the Act of Uniformity 1662, and others engaged the leading divines of the day. Robert Boyle, notable as a scientist, also wrote his Meditations on God, and this work was immensely popular as devotional literature well beyond the Restoration. (Indeed, it is today perhaps most famous for Jonathan Swift's parody of it in Meditation Upon a Broomstick.) Devotional literature in general sold well and attests a wide literacy rate among the English middle classes.

=== Journalism ===
During the Restoration period, the most common manner of getting news would have been a broadsheet publication. A single, large sheet of paper might have a written, usually partisan, account of an event. However, the period saw the beginnings of the first professional and periodical (meaning that the publication was regular) journalism in England. Journalism develops late, generally around the time of William of Orange's claiming the throne in 1689. Coincidentally or by design, England began to have newspapers just when William came to court from Amsterdam, where there were already newspapers being published.

The early efforts at news sheets and periodicals were spotty. Roger L'Estrange produced both The News and City Mercury, but neither of them was a sustained effort. Henry Muddiman was the first to succeed in a regular news paper with the London Gazette. In 1665, Muddiman produced the Oxford Gazette as a digest of news of the royal court, which was in Oxford to avoid the plague in London. When the court moved back to Whitehall later in the year, the title London Gazette was adopted (and is still in use today). Muddiman had begun as a journalist in the Interregnum and had been the official journalist of the Long Parliament (in the form of The Parliamentary Intelligencer). Although Muddiman's productions are the first regular news accounts, they are still not the first modern newspaper, as the work was sent in manuscript by post to subscribers and was not a printed sheet for general sale to the public. That had to wait for The Athenian Mercury.

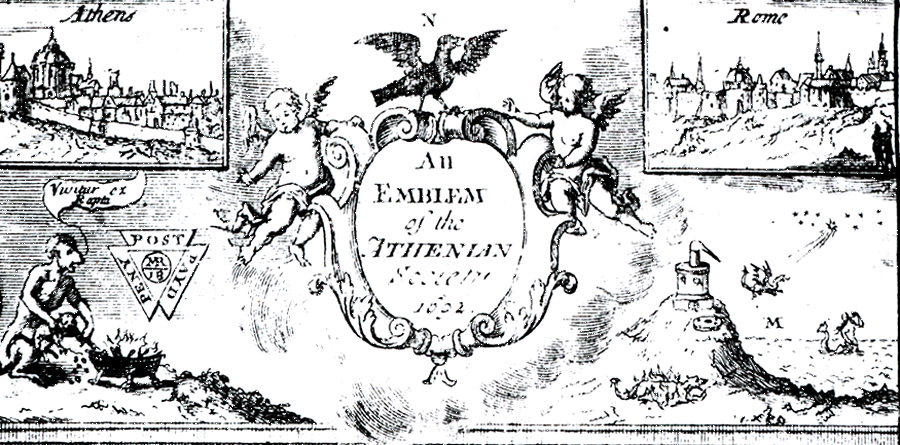
A detail of the frontispiece to The Athenian Oracle, a collection of The Athenian Mercury

Sporadic essays combined with news had been published throughout the Restoration period, but The Athenian Mercury was the first regularly published periodical in England. John Dunton and the "Athenian Society" (actually a mathematician, minister, and philosopher paid by Dunton for their work) began publishing in 1691, just after the reign of William III and Mary II began. In addition to news reports, The Athenian Mercury allowed readers to send in questions anonymously and receive a printed answer. The questions mainly dealt with love and health, but there were some bizarre and intentionally amusing questions as well (e.g. a question on why a person shivers after urination, written in rhyming couplets). The questions section allowed the journal to sell well and to be profitable. Therefore, it ran for six years, produced four books that spun off from the columns, and then received a bound publication as The Athenian Oracle. He also published the first periodical designed for women "The Ladies' Mercury".

The Athenian Mercury set the stage for the later Spectator, Gray's Inn Journal, Temple Bar Journal, and scores of politically oriented journals, such as the original The Guardian, The Observer, The Freeholder, Mist's Journal, and many others. Also, The Athenian Mercury published poetry from contributors, and it was the first to publish the poetry of Jonathan Swift and Elizabeth Singer Rowe. The trend of newspapers would similarly explode in subsequent years; a number of these later papers had runs of a single day and were composed entirely as a method of planting political attacks (Pope called them "Sons of a day" in Dunciad B).• Later Romantic writers, who valued the idea of originality, also prized the meaning of "revolution" which signified a violent break with the past and often represented their work as offering just such a break with tradition. However, changes to literary forms and content occurred much more gradually than this use of the word "revolution" might suggest.

=== Fiction ===
Although it is impossible to satisfactorily date the beginning of the novel in English, long fiction and fictional biographies began to distinguish themselves from other forms in England during the Restoration period. An existing tradition of Romance fiction in France and Spain was popular in England. Ludovico Ariosto's Orlando Furioso engendered prose narratives of love, peril, and revenge, and Gauthier de Costes, seigneur de la Calprenède's novels were quite popular during the Interregnum and beyond.

The "Romance" was considered a feminine form, and women were taxed with reading "novels" as a vice. Inasmuch as these novels were largely read in French or in translation from French, they were associated with effeminacy. However, novels slowly divested themselves of the Arthurian and chivalric trappings and came to centre on more ordinary or picaresque figures. One of the most significant figures in the rise of the novel in the Restoration period is Aphra Behn. She was not only the first professional female novelist, but she may also be among the first professional novelists of either sex in England.

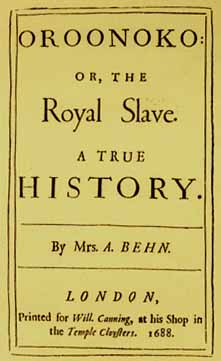
First edition of Aphra Behn's Oroonoko, 1688

Behn's first novel was Love-Letters Between a Nobleman and His Sister in 1684. This was an epistolary novel documenting the amours of a scandalous nobleman who was unfaithful to his wife with her sister (thus making his lover his sister-in-law rather than biological sister). The novel is highly romantic, sexually explicit, and political. Behn wrote the novel in two parts, with the second part showing a distinctly different style from the first. Behn also wrote several "Histories" of fictional figures, such as her The History of a Nun. As the genre of "novel" did not exist, these histories were prose fictions based on biography. However, her most famous novel was Oroonoko in 1688. This was a fictional biography, published as a "true history", of an African king who had been enslaved in Suriname, a colony Behn herself had visited.

Behn's novels show the influence of tragedy and her experiences as a dramatist. Later novels by Daniel Defoe would adopt the same narrative framework, although his choice of biography would be tempered by his experience as a journalist writing "true histories" of criminals.

Other forms of fiction were also popular. Available to readers were versions of the stories of Reynard the Fox, as well as various indigenous folk tales, such as the various Dick Whittington and Tom Thumb fables. Most of these were in verse, but some circulated in prose. These largely anonymous or folk compositions circulated as chapbooks.

=== Subliterary genres and writers ===
Along with the figures mentioned above, the Restoration period saw the beginnings of explicitly political writing and hack writing. Roger L'Estrange was a pamphleteer who became the surveyor of presses and licenser of the press after the Restoration. In 1663–6, L'Estrange published The News (which was not regular in its appearance, see above). When he was implicated in the Popish Plot and fled England, he published The Observator (1681–1687) to attack Titus Oates and the Puritans. L'Estrange's most important contributions to literature, however, came with his translations. He translated Erasmus in 1680, Quevedo in 1668, and, most famously and importantly, Aesop's Fables in 1692 and 1699. This last set off a small craze for writing new fables, and particularly political fables.

Also during the later part of the period, Charles Gildon and Edmund Curll began their work on hireling "Lives." Curll was a bookseller (what today would be called a publisher), and he paid authors to produce biographies, translations, and the like. Similarly, Gildon, who was an occasional friend of Restoration authors, produced biographies with wholesale inventions in them. This writing for pay was despised by the literary authors, who called it "hack" writing.

== Theatre ==
=== Context ===
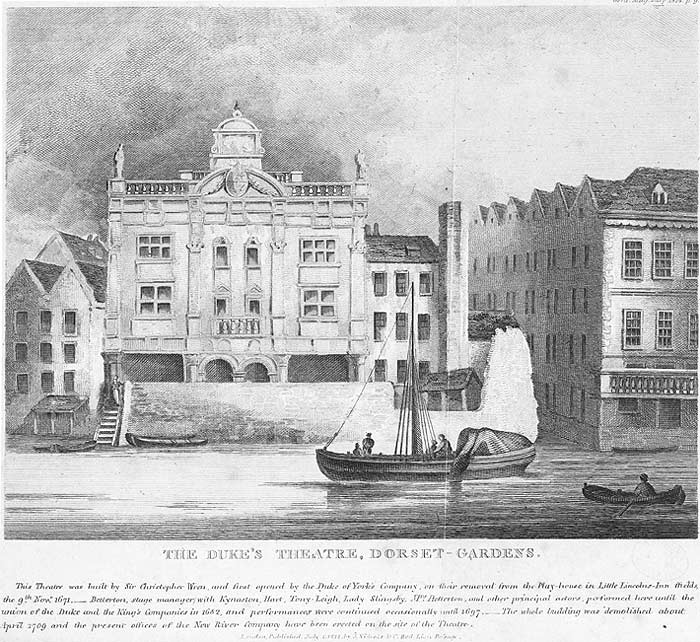
The Duke's Theatre at Dorset Gardens

The return of the stage-struck Charles II to power in 1660 was a major event in English theatre history. As soon as the previous Puritan regime's ban on public stage representations was lifted, the drama recreated itself quickly and abundantly. Two theatre companies, the King's and the Duke's Company, were established in London, with two luxurious playhouses built to designs by Christopher Wren and fitted with moveable scenery and thunder and lightning machines.

Traditionally, Restoration plays have been studied by genre rather than chronology, more or less as if they were all contemporary, but scholars today insist on the rapid evolvement of drama in the period and on the importance of social and political factors affecting it. (Unless otherwise indicated, the account below is based on Hume's influential Development of English Drama in the Late Seventeenth Century, 1976.) The influence of theatre company competition and playhouse economics is also acknowledged, as is the significance of the appearance of the first professional actresses (see Howe).

In the 1660s and 1670s, the London scene was vitalised by the competition between the two patent companies. The need to rise to the challenges of the other house made playwrights and managers extremely responsive to public taste, and theatrical fashions fluctuated almost week by week. The mid-1670s were a high point of both quantity and quality, with John Dryden's Aureng-zebe (1675), William Wycherley's The Country Wife (1675) and The Plain Dealer (1676), George Etherege's The Man of Mode (1676), and Aphra Behn's The Rover (1677), all within a few seasons.

From 1682 the production of new plays dropped sharply, affected both by a merger between the two companies and by the political turmoil of the Popish Plot (1678) and the Exclusion crisis (1682). The 1680s were especially lean years for comedy, the only exception being the remarkable career of Aphra Behn, whose achievement as the first professional British woman dramatist has been the subject of much recent study. There was a swing away from comedy to serious political drama, reflecting preoccupations and divisions following on the political crisis. The few comedies produced also tended to be political in focus, the whig dramatist Thomas Shadwell sparring with the tories John Dryden and Aphra Behn.

In the calmer times after 1688, Londoners were again ready to be amused by stage performance, but the single "United Company" was not well prepared to offer it. No longer powered by competition, the company had lost momentum and been taken over by predatory investors ("Adventurers"), while management in the form of the autocratic Christopher Rich attempted to finance a tangle of "farmed" shares and sleeping partners by slashing actors' salaries. The upshot of this mismanagement was that the disgruntled actors set up their own co-operative company in 1695. A few years of re-invigorated two-company competition followed which allowed a brief second flowering of the drama, especially comedy. Comedies like William Congreve's Love For Love (1695) and The Way of the World (1700), and John Vanbrugh's The Relapse (1696) and The Provoked Wife (1697) were "softer" and more middle class in ethos, very different from the aristocratic extravaganza twenty years earlier, and aimed at a wider audience. If "Restoration literature" is the literature that reflects and reflects upon the court of Charles II, Restoration drama arguably ends before Charles II's death, as the playhouse moved rapidly from the domain of courtiers to the domain of the city middle classes. On the other hand, Restoration drama shows altogether more fluidity and rapidity than other types of literature, and so, even more than in other types of literature, its movements should never be viewed as absolute. Each decade has brilliant exceptions to every rule and entirely forgettable confirmations of it.

=== Drama ===
Genre in Restoration drama is peculiar. Authors labelled their works according to the old tags, "comedy" and "drama" and, especially, "history", but these plays defied the old categories. From 1660 onwards, new dramatic genres arose, mutated, and intermixed very rapidly. In tragedy, the leading style in the early Restoration period was the male-dominated heroic drama, exemplified by John Dryden's The Conquest of Granada (1670) and Aureng-Zebe (1675) which celebrated powerful, aggressively masculine heroes and their pursuit of glory both as rulers and conquerors, and as lovers. These plays were sometimes called by their authors' histories or tragedies, and contemporary critics will call them after Dryden's term of "Heroic drama". Heroic dramas centred on the actions of men of decisive natures, men whose physical and (sometimes) intellectual qualities made them natural leaders. In one sense, this was a reflection of an idealised king such as Charles or Charles's courtiers might have imagined. However, such dashing heroes were also seen by the audiences as occasionally standing in for noble rebels who would redress injustice with the sword. The plays were, however, tragic in the strictest definition, even though they were not necessarily sad.

In the 1670s and 1680s, a gradual shift occurred from heroic to pathetic tragedy, where the focus was on love and domestic concerns, even though the main characters might often be public figures. After the phenomenal success of Elizabeth Barry in moving the audience to tears in the role of Monimia in Thomas Otway's The Orphan (1680), "she-tragedies" (a term coined by Nicholas Rowe), which focused on the sufferings of an innocent and virtuous woman, became the dominant form of pathetic tragedy. Elizabeth Howe has argued that the most important explanation for the shift in taste was the emergence of tragic actresses whose popularity made it unavoidable for dramatists to create major roles for them. With the conjunction of the playwright "master of pathos" Thomas Otway and the great tragedienne Elizabeth Barry in The Orphan, the focus shifted from hero to heroine. Prominent she-tragedies include John Banks's Virtue Betrayed, or, Anna Bullen (1682) (about the execution of Anne Boleyn), Thomas Southerne's The Fatal Marriage (1694), and Nicholas Rowe's The Fair Penitent (1703) and Lady Jane Grey, 1715.

While she-tragedies were more comfortably tragic, in that they showed women who suffered for no fault of their own and featured tragic flaws that were emotional rather than moral or intellectual, their success did not mean that more overtly political tragedy was not staged. The Exclusion crisis brought with it a number of tragic implications in real politics, and therefore any treatment of, for example, the Earl of Essex (several versions of which were circulated and briefly acted at non-patent theatres) could be read as seditious. Thomas Otway's Venice Preserv'd of 1682 was a royalist political play that, like Dryden's Absalom and Achitophel, seemed to praise the king for his actions in the meal tub plot. Otway's play had the floating city of Venice stand in for the river town of London, and it had the dark senatorial plotters of the play stand in for the Earl of Shaftesbury. It even managed to figure in the Duke of Monmouth, Charles's illegitimate, war-hero son who was favoured by many as Charles's successor over the Roman Catholic James. Venice Preserv'd is, in a sense, the perfect synthesis of the older politically royalist tragedies and histories of Dryden and the newer she-tragedies of feminine suffering, for, although the plot seems to be a political allegory, the action centres on a woman who cares for a man in conflict, and most of the scenes and dialogue concern her pitiable sufferings at his hands.

=== Comedy ===
Restoration comedy is notorious for its sexual explicitness, a quality encouraged by Charles II personally and by the rakish aristocratic ethos of his court. The best-known plays of the early Restoration period are the unsentimental or "hard" comedies of John Dryden, William Wycherley, and George Etherege, which reflect the atmosphere at Court, and celebrate an aristocratic macho lifestyle of unremitting sexual intrigue and conquest. The Earl of Rochester, real-life Restoration rake, courtier and poet, is flatteringly portrayed in Etherege's Man of Mode (1676) as a riotous, witty, intellectual, and sexually irresistible aristocrat, a template for posterity's idea of the glamorous Restoration rake (actually never a very common character in Restoration comedy). Wycherley's The Plain Dealer (1676), a variation on the theme of Molière's Le misanthrope, was highly regarded for its uncompromising satire and earned Wycherley the appellation "Plain Dealer" Wycherley or "Manly" Wycherley, after the play's main character Manly. The single writer who most supports the charge of obscenity levelled then and now at Restoration comedy is probably Wycherley.

During the second wave of Restoration comedy in the 1690s, the "softer" comedies of William Congreve and John Vanbrugh reflected mutating cultural perceptions and great social change. The playwrights of the 1690s set out to appeal to more socially mixed audiences with a strong middle-class element, and to female spectators, for instance by moving the war between the sexes from the arena of intrigue into that of marriage. The focus in comedy is less on young lovers outwitting the older generation, more on marital relations after the wedding bells. In Congreve's plays, the give-and-take set pieces of couples still testing their attraction for each other have mutated into witty prenuptial debates on the eve of marriage, as in the famous "Proviso" scene in The Way of the World (1700).

Restoration drama had a bad reputation for three centuries. The "incongruous" mixing of comedy and tragedy beloved by Restoration audiences was decried. The Victorians denounced the comedy as too indecent for the stage, and the standard reference work of the early 20th century, The Cambridge History of English and American Literature, dismissed the tragedy as being of "a level of dulness and lubricity never surpassed before or since". Today, the Restoration total theatre experience is again valued, both by postmodern literary critics and on the stage.

=== Spectacular ===
The Restoration spectacular, or elaborately staged machine play, hit the London public stage in the late 17th-century Restoration period, enthralling audiences with action, music, dance, moveable scenery, baroque illusionistic painting, gorgeous costumes, and special effects such as trapdoor tricks, "flying" actors, and fireworks. From the start, these shows had ill reputations as vulgar and commercial threats to the witty, "legitimate" Restoration dramas. They drew Londoners in unprecedented numbers, however, and left them dazzled and delighted.

== See also ==
- 1660 in literature to 1689 in literature
- 1660 in poetry to 1689 in poetry
- 17th century in literature
- 17th century in poetry

== Notes ==
Preceded by Elizabethan literature	Restoration literature 1660–1700	Succeeded by Augustan literature
