= Love in the Dark (play) =

1675 play

- Written by: Francis Fane
- Original language: English
- Genre: Restoration Comedy

Premiere
- Date premiered: 10 May 1675
- Place premiered: Theatre Royal, Drury Lane, London

Love In The Dark; Or, The Man of Bus'ness is a 1675 comedy play by the English writer Francis Fane. It was first staged by the King's Company at the Theatre Royal, Drury Lane in London. The epilogue was written by the Earl of Rochester, and may also have contributed some of the more libertine lines to the play. It is set in Venice.

The original Drury Lane cast included Edward Lydall as Loredano, Nicholas Burt as Cardinal Colonna, William Cartwright as Hircanio, Philip Griffin as Grimani, William Wintershall as Cornanti, John Lacy as Intrigo, Edward Kynaston as Count Sforza, Michael Mohun as Tribultio, Joseph Haines as Visconti, Martin Powell as Proveditor, Elizabeth James as Aurana and Elizabeth Boutell as Bellinganna.

== Bibliography ==
- Alston, R.C. Order and Connexion: Studies in Bibliography and Book History. Boydell & Brewer, 1997.
- Canfield, J. Douglas. Tricksters and Estates: On the Ideology of Restoration Comedy. University Press of Kentucky, 2014.
- Van Lennep, W. The London Stage, 1660-1800: Volume One, 1660-1700. Southern Illinois University Press, 1960.
