= Love in a Wood (play) =

1671 play

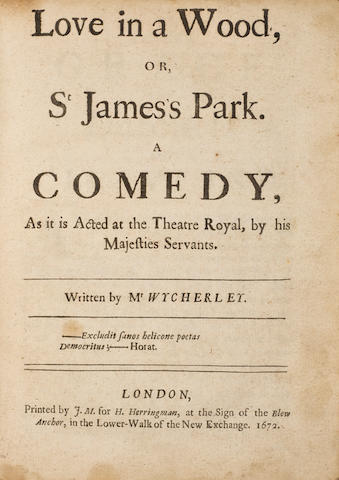
- Original language: English
- Written by: William Wycherley
- Genre: Restoration Comedy
- Setting: London, present day

Premiere
- Date: March 1671
- Place: Theatre Royal, Drury Lane, London

Love in a Wood; Or, St James's Park is a 1671 comedy play by the English writer William Wycherley. His debut play, it was first staged at the Theatre Royal, Drury Lane by the King's Company.

The original cast included Charles Hart as Ranger, Richard Bell as Vincent, Edward Kynaston as Valentine, John Lacy as Alderman Gripe, William Wintershall as Sir Simon Addleplot, Michael Mohun as Dapperwit, Elizabeth Boutell as Christina, Elizabeth Cox as Lydia, Mary Knep as Lady Flippant, Katherine Corey as Mrs Joyner and Elizabeth James as Isabel. The published version of the following year was dedicated to the Duchess of Cleveland, mistress of Charles II.

== Bibliography ==
- Van Lennep, W. The London Stage, 1660-1800: Volume One, 1660-1700. Southern Illinois University Press, 1960.
