= The Generous Enemies =

1671 play

- Original language: English
- Written by: John Corye
- Genre: Restoration Comedy

Premiere
- Date: June 1671
- Place: Theatre Royal, Drury Lane, London

The Generous Enemies; Or, The Ridiculous Lovers is a 1671 comedy play by the writer John Corye. It was first staged by the King's Company at the Theatre Royal, Drury Lane in London.

The original cast included William Wintershall as Signior Robatzy, Edward Lydall as Signior Cassidoro, Michael Mohun as Don Alvarez, Edward Kynaston as Signior Flaminio, William Cartwright as Don Bertran, Richard Bell as Sanco, Rebecca Marshall as Jaccinta, Elizabeth James as Alleria, Elizabeth Boutell as Lysander and Katherine Corey as Julia.

== Bibliography ==
- Van Lennep, W. The London Stage, 1660-1800: Volume One, 1660-1700. Southern Illinois University Press, 1960.
