= Nero (play) =

1674 play

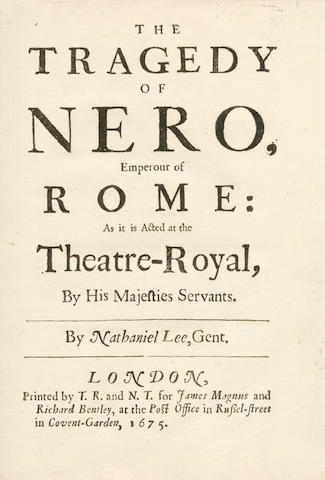
- Written by: Nathaniel Lee
- Original language: English
- Genre: Tragedy
- Setting: Ancient Rome, 1st Century

Premiere
- Date premiered: May 1674
- Place premiered: Theatre Royal, Drury Lane, London

The Tragedy of Nero, Emperour of Rome is a 1674 tragedy by the English writer Nathaniel Lee. It was originally performed at the Theatre Royal, Drury Lane by the King's Company.

The first Drury Lane cast included Charles Hart as Nero, Michael Mohun as Britannicus, Nicholas Burt as Petronius, William Wintershall as Otho, Edward Lydall as Piso, William Cartwright as Seneca, Thomas Clark as Drusillus, John Coysh as Plautus, Marmaduke Watson as Silvius, Martin Powell as Mirmilon, Philip Griffin as Caligula's Ghost, Rebecca Marshall as Poppea, Katherine Corey as Agrippina, Elizabeth Cox as Octavia and Elizabeth Boutell as Cyara.

== Bibliography ==
- Van Lennep, W. The London Stage, 1660-1800: Volume One, 1660-1700. Southern Illinois University Press, 1960.
