= The Roman Empress =

1670 play

- Original language: English
- Written by: William Joyner
- Genre: Tragedy
- Setting: Ancient Rome

Premiere
- Date: August 1670
- Place: Theatre Royal, Drury Lane, London

The Roman Empress is a 1670 tragedy by the writer William Joyner. It was first staged by the King's Company at the Theatre Royal, Drury Lane.

The original cast included Michael Mohun as Valentius, Edward Kynaston as Florus, Richard Bell as Honorius, Edward Lydall as Statilius, William Beeston as Macrinus, Rebecca Marshall as Fulvia, Elizabeth Knepp as Antonia, Marmaduke Watson as Hostilius, William Cartwright as Arsenius, Elizabeth Boutell as Aurelia and Katherine Corey as Sophonia. The published version of the play was dedicated to the writer Charles Sedley.

== Plot ==
The rightful Emperor of Rome, Valentius, is at war with his brother, Hostilius, who has usurped the throne. Valentius, believing himself to be the son of Macrinus, is clandestinely informed by Arsenius, a member of the opposing side, that he is, in actuality, his son, distressing him. The Emperor's wife, Fulvia, attempts to seduce Florus. When Fulvia fails, she resolves to take revenge by claiming that Florus forced himself upon her; Florus is promptly executed. Aurelia, Valentius's niece and Florus's former lover, has sworn Florus off (and actively facilitated his execution by claiming that he betrayed Valentius) after being told by her father that her lover killed her brother in battle. Upon discovering that her father lied to her in the hopes that she would cease to pursue Florus, she murders him. Afterwards, Sophonia, the Emperor's first wife- who, after being wrongfully accused of adultery, has been posing as the handmaid of Aurelia- commits suicide and leaves a note revealing her innocence as well as the fact Florus was her son, whom she, fearing that her own disgrace would endanger his life, passed off as Macrinus's child. After Valentius reads Sophonia's note, Macrinus explains that he had been asked by Arsenius. to rear his son as his own while he left to fight for Hostilius. While Macrinus complied with the Arsenius's wishes, the latter's child died. In order to protect Valentius's son, Macrinus let Arsenius believe that the child Macrinus was now raising was Arsenius's own son. Distressed by these revelations, Valentius commits suicide shortly thereafter.

== Influences ==
William Joyner states in his preface that The Roman Empress is partially modeled after Oedipus and Phaedra. Although he does not clarify which dramatizations of these myths he refers to, the scene between Fulvia and her nurse, Antonia, is clearly modeled after the second scene of Act I in Seneca's Hippolytus (which in the 21st century, is typically referred to as Phaedra). Interestingly, Sophonia's death greatly resembles that of Phaedra in the Hippolytus of Euripides.

== Scholarship ==
The academic Anne Hermanson believes the play anticipates a certain branch of the Restoration Horror Play, in that Joyner's drama interrogates monarchical authority.

== Bibliography ==
- Van Lennep, W. The London Stage, 1660-1800: Volume One, 1660-1700. Southern Illinois University Press, 1960.

- Joyner, William. The Roman Empress, a Tragedy, Printed by T.N. for Henry Harrington, 1671
