= Amboyna (play) =

Restoration heroic tragedy by John Dryden

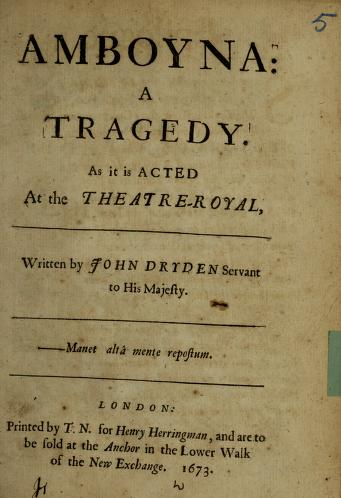
- Written by: John Dryden
- Original language: English
- Genre: Tragedy
- Setting: Ambon Island, East Indies, 1620s

Premiere
- Date premiered: May 1673
- Place premiered: Lincoln's Inn Fields Theatre, London

Amboyna, or the Cruelties of the Dutch to the English Merchants is a tragedy by John Dryden written in 1673. Its subject is the Amboyna massacre and the death of Gabriel Towerson that took place on Ambon Island in 1623. Dryden reportedly wrote the play in the short space of a month; he wanted to produce a topical piece, since England was at that time at war with the Dutch Republic. It was dedicated to Lord Clifford, a member of the Cabal.

The original production was acted by the King's Company at the theatre at Lincoln's Inn Fields. The original cast included Charles Hart as Captain Gabriel Towerson, Michael Mohun as Beaumont, Edward Lydall as Collins, Marmaduke Watson as Captain Middleton, Nicholas Burt as Perez, William Cartwright as Harman, William Wintershall as The Fiscal, William Beeston as Van Herring, Elizabeth James as Julia, Rebecca Marshall as Ysabinda and Katherine Corey as English Woman.

Towerson's wife in the play, Ysabinda, is based on his real life wife, Mariam Khan (dates unknown), daughter of an influential merchant at the courts of the Mughul Emperors Akbar and Jahangir.

== Bibliography ==
- Van Lennep, W. The London Stage, 1660-1800: Volume One, 1660-1700. Southern Illinois University Press, 1960.
