= The Conquest of Granada =

Restoration heroic tragedy by John Dryden

- Original language: English
- Written by: John Dryden
- Genre: Tragedy
- Setting: Spain, 1490s

Premiere
- Date: December 1670
- Place: Theatre Royal, Drury Lane, London

The Conquest of Granada by the Spaniards (written 1670-1671, published 1672), is a two-part tragedy by John Dryden about the Spanish conquest of Granada (1482–1491), and the fall of Muhammad XI of Granada, the last Nasrit ruler of the Emirate of Granada (1230–1492), in southern Iberia. As a stageplay from the period of the English Restoration (1660), The Conquest of Granada is an example of the heroic drama genre in which the playwright Dryden was a pioneer writer; the first performance of the play was in 1670 and the first publication of the play was in 1672.

== Plot ==
The Conquest of Granada by the Spaniards concerns the Battle of Granada (1482–1491), fought between the Moors and the Spanish, which led to the fall of the Emirate of Granada (1230–1492). The action concerns two factions of Moors, the Abencerrages and the Zegry. The hero of the play is Almanzor, who fights for the Moors, and falls in love with Almahide, who is betrothed to Boabdelin, the King of the Moors. Although Almahide reciprocates Almanzor's love, she will not betray her betrothal to King Boabdelin, who is emotionally distressed by jealousy of and military need for Almanzor in fighting the Spaniards during the Reconquista.

In the course of events, Almanzor and Almahide remain separated until the death of Boabdelin. Additional to the protagonist's love story, two other plots involve frustrated love: (i) Abdalla, brother of King Boabdelin, and Abdelmelich, leader of the Abencerrage faction, vie for the love of Lyndaraxa, sister of the Zegry leader; and (ii) Niggr, a young man from the Abencerrage faction, loves Benzayda, who is a Zegry woman. The course of the drama reveals that Almanzor is the lost son of the Duke of Arcos, but dutifully fights the Spaniards for the Moors.

== Genre ==
The Conquest of Granada by the Spaniards is written in closed couplets of iambic pentameter, and in the Preface to the printed edition of the play, Dryden proposed a new genre of drama that celebrated heroic figures and heroic actions in metre and rhyme that emphasised the dignity of heroic action. The innovation is the poetic diction in English metre and vocabulary that corresponded to the verse structure of Latin. The closed iambic couplet is also known as the heroic couplet. Concerning the substance of an heroic play, Dryden said that heroic drama must demonstrate the Classical virtues of strength of character and masculine decisiveness.

== Satire ==
The fame of the play invited satire of The Conquest of Granada by other playwrights. One example is The Rehearsal, written by George Villiers, 2nd Duke of Buckingham. Henry Fielding, in Tragedy of Tragedies, or the Life and Death of Tom Thumb the Great (1730) also takes aim at the silliness of some of The Conquest of Granada. For example, the lofty aims expressed in the "Preface" to Fielding's play seem mismatched to the material.

== Performance ==
The original 1670 production of The Conquest of Granada by the Spaniards was by the King's Company, and featured Edward Kynaston as "Mahomet Boabdelin, last King of Granada", Charles Hart as Almanzor, and Nell Gwyn as Almahide, Rebecca Marshall as Lyndaraxa, Elizabeth Boutell as Bezayda, and Edward Lydall as Prince Abdalla, William Beeston as Ozmyn, Richard Bell as the Duke of Arcos, and Michael Mohun as Abdemelech, Martin Powell as Gomel, Marmaduke Watson as Hamet, and William Cartwright as Abenamar, Elizabeth James as Isabella and William Wintershall as Selin. Nell Gwyn spoke the Prologue to Part 1 of The Conquest of Granada.

== See also ==
- Poetic diction
- Short View of the Immorality and Profaneness of the English Stage
- The Rehearsal (play)
- Restoration comedy for a discussion of the charges of scandal that spurred renewed seriousness
- Almahide (Opera)
- Il Conquisto di Granata
