= 1667 in literature =

This article contains information about the literary events and publications of 1667.

== Events ==
- January – Courtier Tobias Rustat creates the first endowment for the purchase of books for Cambridge University Library in England.
- February 22 – The Lejonkulan ("lion's den") opens at Stockholm in Sweden as the first permanent theater in Scandinavia, with the performance of Jean Magnon's Orontes en Satira.
- March 2 – The premiere of John Dryden's tragicomedy Secret Love, or The Maiden Queen at the Theatre Royal, Drury Lane in London is well received by an audience including King Charles II of England, his brother the Duke of York and Samuel Pepys. The cast includes Nell Gwyn in one of the first breeches roles in Restoration theatre and her lover Charles Hart.
- April 15 - Edward Howard's play The Change of Crowns is first performed, in London. Actor John Lacy improvises a few lines about influence-peddling at court, angering King Charles II, a member of the audience (as is Samuel Pepys, who thinks it a great play). The theatre is closed for a time and Lacy jailed.
- April 27 – The blind, impoverished 58-year-old John Milton seals a contract (one of the first detailed contracts between author and printer known in England) for publication of Paradise Lost with London printer Samuel Simmons for an initial payment of £5. The first edition is published in October and sells out in eighteen months.
- July – English scholar and poet Edmund Castell is imprisoned for debt.
- July 28 – For the second time in his life, playwright Thomas Porter mortally wounds an opponent (his friend Sir Henry Bellasis) in a duel, and is then forced to flee from England.
- August 6 – Molière's satirical comedy Tartuffe receives its premiere in a revised form as L'Imposteur and is immediately banned.
- August 20 – Molière writes his Lettre sur la comédie de l'Imposteur in response to criticisms of Tartuffe.
- September 12 – Sir William Davenant's adaptation of the old play Greene's Tu Quoque is first performed.
- November – Edward Hyde, 1st Earl of Clarendon, is impeached by Parliament and forced into exile in France, where he spends the rest of his life working on his history of the English Civil War.
- November 7 – The Tempest, or The Enchanted Island, an adaptation of Shakespeare's The Tempest by John Dryden and Sir William Davenant, receives its première by the Duke's Company at the Lincoln's Inn Fields Theatre in London; it becomes "the most frequently revived play of the entire Restoration".
- unknown date – The Roman Catholic Church places the works of René Descartes on the Index Librorum Prohibitorum.

== New books ==
=== Prose ===
- Margaret Cavendish – The life of the thrice noble, high and puissant prince William Cavendishe, Duke, Marquess, and Earl of Newcastle
- Richard Head – The life and death of Mother Shipton
- Thomas Sprat – The History of the Royal Society

=== Drama ===
- Roger Boyle, 1st Earl of Orrery – The Black Prince
- John Caryll – The English Princess
- Pierre Corneille – Attila
- William Cavendish, Duke of Newcastle – The Humorous Lovers
- John Dryden – Secret Love, or the Maiden Queen
- Richard Flecknoe – The Damoiselles à la Mode
- Edward Howard – The Change of Crowns
- John Lacy – Sauny the Scot, or the Taming of the Shrew (adapted from Shakespeare's play)
- Jean Racine – Andromaque
- Sir Charles Sedley – Antony and Cleopatra
- Elkanah Settle – Cambyses, King of Persia
- Joost van den Vondel – Noach

=== Poetry ===
- Jeremias de Dekker (died 1666) – Lof der Geldzucht ("In praise of avarice" – satire)
- John Dryden – Annus Mirabilis, the Year of Wonders 1666
- John Milton – Paradise Lost

== Births ==
- April 29 – John Arbuthnot, Scottish satirist and polymath (died 1735)
- November 30 – Jonathan Swift, Irish satirist and novelist (died 1745)
- unknown dates
  - Susanna Centlivre, English actress and playwright (died 1723)
  - John Richardson, English Quaker preacher and autobiographer (died 1753)
  - Ned Ward (Edward Ward), English satirical writer and publican (died 1731)

== Deaths ==
- January 19 – Percy Herbert, 2nd Baron Powis, English writer (born 1598)
- March 16 (or 17) – Philippe Labbe, French Jesuit writer (born 1607)
- May 2 – George Wither, English poet and pamphleteer (born 1588)
- May 14 – Georges de Scudéry, French poet (born 1601)
- August 13 – Jeremy Taylor, English religious writer and bishop (born 1613)
- August 31 – Johann Rist, German poet and dramatist known for hymns (born 1607)
- October – Antonio Abati, Italian poet
- November – Grigory Kotoshikhin, Russian writer and diplomat (executed for murder, born 1630)
- probable – John Heydon, English Rosicrucian and writer on the occult (born 1629)
