= Aureng-zebe =

Restoration heroic drama by John Dryden

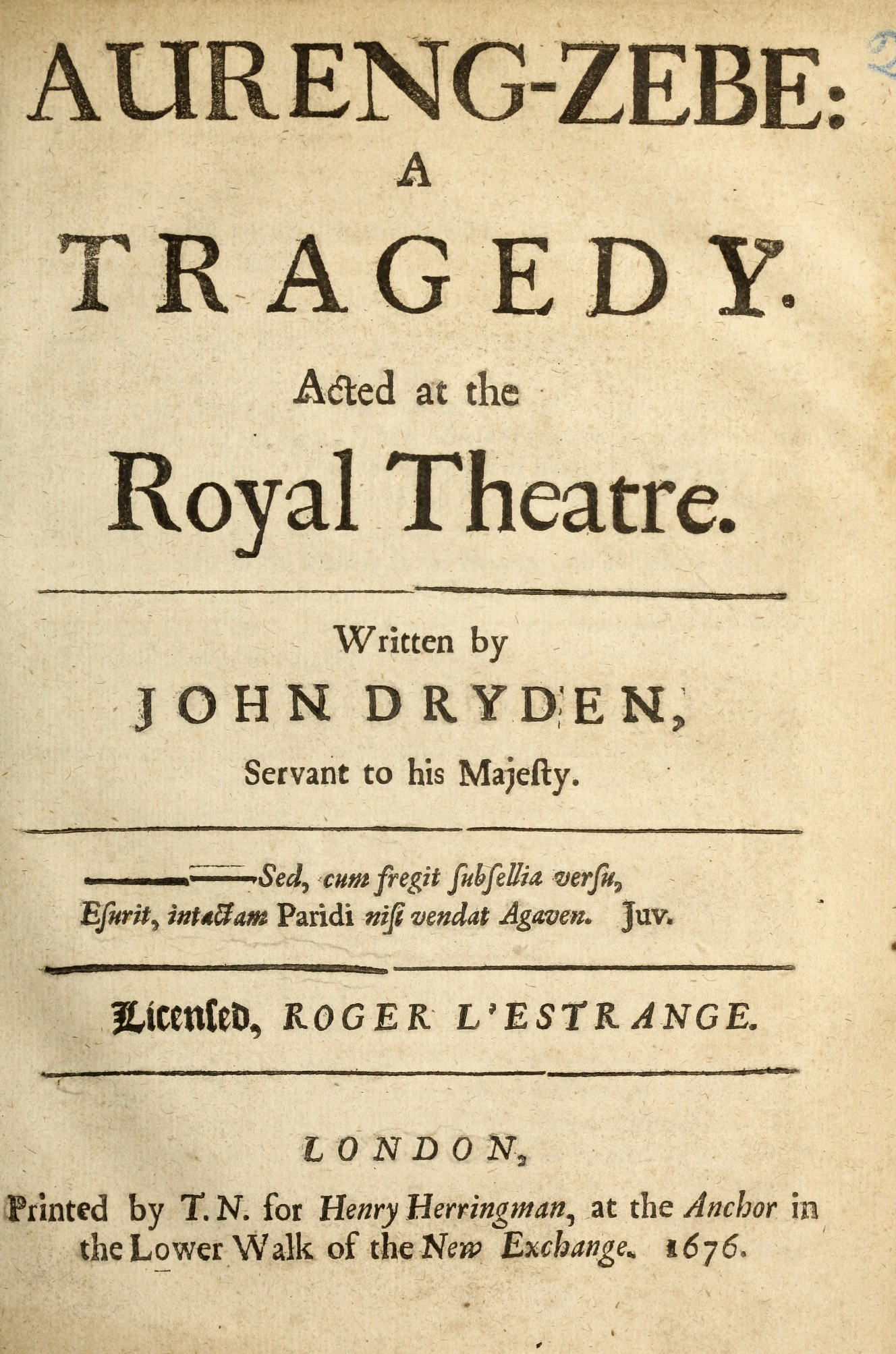
The title page of the first edition of Aureng-Zebe (1676)

Aureng-zebe is a Restoration drama by John Dryden, written in 1675. It is based loosely on the figures of Aurangzeb (Aureng-zebe), the then-reigning Mughal emperor of India; his brother, Murad Baksh (Morat); and their father, Shah Jahan (Emperor). The piece is the last drama that Dryden wrote in rhymed verse. It is considered his best tragic work.

The premiere production by the King's Company featured Charles Hart in the title role, Michael Mohun as the Old Emperor, Edward Kynaston as Morat, William Wintershall as Arimant, Rebecca Marshall as the Empress Nourmahal, Elizabeth Cox as Indamora, and Mary Corbett as Melesinda.

Henry Purcell composed a song, "I see, she flies me ev'rywhere”, Z. 573, for a 1692/93 production of the play at London’s Drury Lane Theatre.

== Modern adaptations ==
The play was adapted as The Captive Queen, and performed by Northern Broadsides at the Sam Wanamaker Playhouse in February and March 2018. It was the final production with the company for its founder and artistic director Barrie Rutter, and as well as directing, he played the part of the emperor.
