= John Corey =

John Corey may refer to:

- John Corey (character), lead character in Nelson DeMille's John Corey series
- John Corey (actor) (fl. 1701–1735), 18th-century English stage actor and playwright
- John Corye (fl. 1676), English playwright, known only for The Generous Enemies

== See also ==
- John Cory (1828–1910), British philanthropist, coal-owner and ship-owner
