= Edward Lydall =

English actor

Edward Lydall was an English stage actor of the seventeenth century. He was a member of the King's Company at the Theatre Royal, Drury Lane. His first known performance was in 1668. He generally played supporting roles. His surname is sometimes written as Lidell.

== Selected roles ==
- Don Melchor de Guzman in An Evening's Love by John Dryden (1668)
- Valerius in Tyrannick Love by John Dryden (1669)
- Statilius in The Roman Empress by William Joyner (1670)
- Prince Abdalla in The Conquest of Granada by John Dryden (1670)
- Signor Cassidoro in The Generous Enemies by John Corye (1671)
- Argaleon in Marriage à la mode by John Dryden (1672)
- Collins in Amboyna by John Dryden (1673)
- Don Alonzo in The Spanish Rogue by Thomas Duffett (1673)
- Piso in Nero by Nathaniel Lee (1674)
- Lelius in Sophonisba by Nathaniel Lee (1675)
- Apollo in Psyche Debauched by Thomas Duffet (1675)
- Loredano in Love in the Dark by Francis Fane (1675)
- Dorilant in The Country Wife by William Wycherley (1675)
- Tiberius in Gloriana by Nathaniel Lee (1676)
- Oroandes in Wits Led By the Nose by William Chamberlayne (1677)
- Perdiccas in The Rival Queens by Nathaniel Lee (1677)
- Sir Oliver Bellingham in The Country Innocence by John Leanerd (1677)

== Bibliography ==
- Van Lennep, W. The London Stage, 1660–1800: Volume One, 1660–1700. Southern Illinois University Press, 1960.
- Wilson, John Harold. Mr. Goodman the Player. University of Pittsburgh Press, 1964.
