= Tyrannick Love =

Restoration heroic tragedy by John Dryden

- 1686 edition
- Original language: English
- Written by: John Dryden
- Genre: Tragedy
- Setting: Roman Empire, 4th Century

Premiere
- Date: 24 June 1669
- Place: Theatre Royal, Drury Lane, London

Tyrannick Love, or The Royal Martyr is a tragedy by John Dryden in rhymed couplets, first acted in June 1669, and published in 1670. It is a retelling of the story of Saint Catherine of Alexandria and her martyrdom by the Roman Emperor Maximinus, the "tyrant" of the title, who is enraged at Catherine's refusal to submit to his violent sexual passion. Dryden reportedly wrote the play in only seven weeks.

== Performance by Nell Gwyn ==
Nell Gwyn played the tyrant's daughter Valeria, and spoke "what must be the most amusing epilogue ever written" (in the words of Maximillian E. Novak, Dryden's modern editor). However, at that time "amusing" meant "thoughtful or thought-provoking" and was therefore very complimentary to both the play and the execution. The modern interpretation of "amusing" undermines the actual reality. When two stagehands came onstage to carry off Valeria's corpse at the play's end, Gwyn jumped up and assumed her genuine identity, though still in costume, to deliver the epilogue.

== The rest of the original cast ==
In addition to Gwyn, the original 1669 production by the King's Company featured Margaret Hughes as St. Catherine, Michael Mohun as Maximus, Charles Hart as Porphyrius, Rebecca Marshall as Berenice, William Cartwright as Apollonius, Edward Lydall as Valerius, William Beeston as Nigrinus, Richard Bell as Amariel, Elizabeth James as Damilcar and Edward Kynaston as Placidius. Mary Knep doubled the roles of Nakar and Felicia.

== Dedication and reception ==
The play was dedicated to the Duke of Monmouth. The play was a major success, and was acted for 14 days straight. The work was revived in 1677, 1686, 1694, and 1702.
