= The Assignation =

Restoration comedy by John Dryden

- Original language: English
- Written by: John Dryden
- Genre: Restoration Comedy

Premiere
- Date: November 1672
- Place: Lincoln's Inn Fields Theatre, London

The Assignation, or Love in a Nunnery is a Restoration comedy written by John Dryden. The play was first acted late in 1672, by the King's Company at their theatre at Lincoln's Inn Fields, but was not a success with its audience.

Apart from the question of the play's quality — many critics have regarded it as a rush job, written mainly in prose with some blank verse — Dryden was suspected of anti-Catholic satire, especially in his choice of a subtitle. This was a sensitive issue at the time, given strong Catholic sympathies among some elements of the royal court — primarily the Duke of York, the future King James II.

The cast of the original production included Michael Mohun as the Duke of Mantua, Edward Kynaston as Prince Frederick, Charles Hart as Aurelian, Joseph Haines as Benito, William Cartwright as Mario, and Nicholas Burt as Camillo. The role of Hyppolita, the nun, was taken by Mary Knep; Rebecca Marshall played Lucretia, Elizabeth James was Sophronia, Elizabeth Boutell was Laura and Elizabeth Cox was Violetta.

Dryden drew plot material from a play by Pedro Calderón de la Barca titled Con quien vengo vengo.

The Assignation was published in quarto in 1673 by Henry Herringman. Dryden dedicated the play to Sir Charles Sedley. The play was republished in 1678 and 1692.

== See also ==
- "The Assignation" is also a short story by Edgar Allan Poe.
- The Assignation is also a collection of short stories by Joyce Carol Oates (1988), The Ecco Press.
