= The Black Prince (play) =

Play by Roger Boyle

- Published version of play along with Tryphon another work by the same author.
- Original language: English
- Written by: Roger Boyle, 1st Earl of Orrery
- Genre: Tragedy
- Setting: Kingdom of France, 1350s

Premiere
- Date: 19 October 1667
- Place: Theatre Royal, Drury Lane, London

The Black Prince is a Restoration era stage play, a historical tragedy written by Roger Boyle, 1st Earl of Orrery. It premiered on stage in 1667 and was first published in 1669. The play relied on influences from contemporaneous French theatre, and contributed to the evolution of the subgenre of heroic drama; yet it also looked back to the Caroline era to assimilate masque-like dramatic effects.

== Plot ==
As its title indicates, the play deals with the historical career of Edward, the Black Prince and his defeat and capture of King John II of France at the Battle of Poitiers (1356).

== Original cast ==
The premiere was staged by the King's Company at the first Theatre Royal, Drury Lane on 19 October 1667. The opening performance was attended by many members of the English royal court, including the King: "Charles II and persons of the court gathered to honour the most distinguished playwright of the nobility." The production featured Edward Kynaston as the title character, Michael Mohun as King Edward III, William Wintershall as King John, Charles Hart as Lord Delaware, Nicholas Burt as Count Guesselin, William Beeston as Page and William Cartwright as Lord Latimer; Nell Gwyn as Alizia Pearce, Rebecca Marshall as Plantagenet, Mary Knep as Sevina and Katherine Corey as Cleorin.

== Criticism by Samuel Pepys ==
Samuel Pepys attended the first and third performances of the play; he thought the drama itself was weak, but admired the staging.

== Printed versions ==
The play was first printed in Two New Tragedies (1669), along with Boyle's Tryphon, by Henry Herringman. In the following year, it appeared again, in Four New Plays, a collection of Boyle's dramas, also from Herringman.
