= Teresa Enríquez =

Spanish courtier

Teresa Enríquez (1450-1529), was a Spanish courtier.

She was married to Gutierre de Cárdenas. Her spouse was the courtier of Ferdinand II of Aragon, and she was the lady-in-waiting of Isabella I of Castile. She was an influential figure at court. She became known for her building projects and philanthropy. She is known for her care for the injured during the conquest of Granada in 1492.

On March 23, 2023, Pope Francis approved Teresa's practice of heroic virtue and declared her venerable.
