= Sertorius (disambiguation) =

Quintus Sertorius (c. 126–73 BC) was a rebellious Roman general and statesman.

Sertorius may also refer to:

- Sertorius (Bancroft play), a 1679 English-language play by John Bancroft
- Sertorius (Corneille play), a 1662 French-language play by Pierre Corneille
