= Elizabeth Boutell =

British actress

Elizabeth Boutell (early 1650s?—1715), was a British actress.

== Life ==
She joined, soon after its formation, the company at the Theatre Royal, subsequently known as Drury Lane, and was accordingly one of the first women to appear on the English stage. Her earliest recorded appearance took place presumably in 1663 or 1664, as Estifania in Rule a Wife and Have a Wife. She joined the King's Company about 1670 and played many important roles in the 1670s, including Benzayda in John Dryden's The Conquest of Granada (December 1670 and January 1671), and probably Rosalinda in Nathaniel Lee's Sophonisba (3 April 1675).

She "created" among other characters, Melantha in Dryden's Marriage à la mode (c. April 1672), Margery Pinchwife in William Wycherley's The Country Wife (12 January 1675), Cleopatra in Dryden's All for Love, and Mrs. Termagant in Shadwell's The Squire of Alsatia. Cibber somewhat curiously omits from his Apology all mention of her name.

Her most famous role was the loving and trustful Queen Statira in The Rival Queens (17 March 1677). She formed a notable acting partnership with Rebecca Marshall in a series of fashionable "women in conflict" plays, in which Boutell played the virtuous heroine to Marshall's darker antagonist. Boutell specialized in breeches roles, such as Fidelia in Wycherley's The Plain Dealer (11 December 1676).

Edmund Curll described Boutell in The History of the English Stage (1741), a work supposedly based on the notes of the famous actor Thomas Betterton, who was the King's Company's de facto manager in the 1670s:

A very considerable Actress; she was low of Stature, had very agreeable Features, a good Complexion, but a Childish Look. Her Voice was weak, tho' very mellow; she generally acted the young, innocent Lady whom all the Heroes are mad in Love with; she was a Favourite of the Town.

A well-known story holds that, having for the character of Statira obtained from the property-man a veil to which Mrs. Barry, who played Roxana, thought herself entitled, an argument ensued between the two actresses, and Mrs. Barry dealt so forcible a blow with a dagger as to pierce through Mrs. Boutel's stays, and inflict a wound a quarter of an inch in length. During her active and busy career in the 1670s, she was according to the Biographical Dictionary of Actors generally considered a "very talented, popular, beautiful, and promiscuous young woman".

Davies, in his 'Dramatic Miscellanies,' (vol. ii. p. 404), speaks of Mrs. Boutel as 'celebrated for the gentler parts in tragedy such as Aspatia in the "Maid's Tragedy." ' No roles are recorded for her between March 1678 and April 1688. Her husband Barnaby Boutell had a lieutenant's commission from 1681, and the Biographical Dictionary of Actors speculates that she may have followed him to the Continent in the 1680s. Her last recorded role was with Thomas Betterton's company at Lincoln's Inn Fields in 1696, where she played Thomyris in Cyrus the Great.

In 1697 she left for Holland with her husband. She appears to have lived in comfort for some years subsequently. She made a will in 1714, which was proved the following year.

== Selected roles ==
- Donna Theodosia in An Evening's Love by John Dryden (1668)
- Aurelia in The Roman Empress by William Joyner (1670)
- Benzayda in The Conquest of Granada by John Dryden (1671)
- Christina in Love in a Wood by William Wycherley (1671)
- Lysander in The Generous Enemies by John Corye (1671)
- Melantha in Marriage à la mode by John Dryden (1672)
- Laura in The Assignation by John Dryden (1672)
- Alcinda in The Spanish Rogue by Thomas Duffett (1673)
- Cyara in Nero by Nathaniel Lee (1674)
- Clara in The Amorous Old Woman by Thomas Duffett (1674)
- Margery in The Country Wife by William Wycherley (1675)
- Bellinganna in Love in the Dark by Francis Fane (1675)
- Fidelia in The Plain Dealer by William Wycherley (1676)
- Statira in The Rival Queens by Nathaniel Lee (1677)
- Matilda in King Edgar and Alfreda by Thomas Ravenscroft (1677)
- Glorianda in Wits Led by the Nose by William Chamberlayne (1677)
- Cleopatra in All for Love by John Dryden (1677)
- Clarona in The Destruction of Jerusalem by John Crowne (1677)
- Semandra in Mithridates, King of Pontus by Nathaniel Lee (1678)
- Cellida in Trick for Trick by Thomas D'Urfey (1678)
- Rosalinda in Sophonisba by Nathaniel Lee (1681)
- Aurelia in A Fool's Preferment by Thomas D'Urfey (1688)
- Mrs Termagant in The Squire of Alsatia by Thomas Shadwell (1688)
- Mrs Fantast in Bury Fair by Thomas Shadwell (1689)
- Semanthe in The Treacherous Brothers by George Powell (1690)
- Lady Credulous in The English Frier by John Crowne (1690)
- Dowdy in She Ventures and He Wins by Ariadne (1695)
- Thomyris in Cyrus the Great by Joseph Banks (1695)
- Constantia in The She-Gallants by George Granville (1695)
- Clara in The City Bride by Joseph Harris (1696)
- Francilia in Love's a Jest by Peter Motteux (1696)

== Sources ==
- Highfill, Philip Jr, Burnim, Kalman A., and Langhans, Edward (1973–93). Biographical Dictionary of Actors, Actresses, Musicians, Dancers, Managers and Other Stage Personnel in London, 1660–1800. 16 volumes. Carbondale, Illinois: Southern Illinois University Press.
- Howe, Elizabeth (1992). The First English Actresses: Women and Drama, 1660–1700. Cambridge: Cambridge University Press.
- Milhous, Judith (1985). "Elizabeth Bowtell and Elizabeth Davenport: some puzzles solved" in Theatre Notebook, 39. London: The Society for Theatre Research pp. 124–34
