= Marriage à la mode (play) =

Restoration comedy by John Dryden

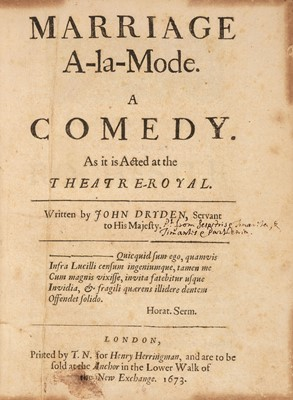
- Written by: John Dryden
- Original language: English
- Genre: Restoration comedy
- Setting: Sicily

Premiere
- Date premiered: 1673
- Place premiered: Theatre Royal, Drury Lane London

Marriage à la Mode is a Restoration comedy by John Dryden, first performed in London in 1673 by the King's Company. It is written in a combination of prose, blank verse and heroic couplets. It has often been praised as Dryden's best comedic endeavour, and James Sutherland accounts for this by observing that "the comic scenes are beautifully written, and Dryden has taken care to connect them with the serious plot by a number of effective links. He writes with ... one of the most thoughtful treatments of sex and marriage that Restoration comedy can show."

The play contains two songs, "Why Should a Foolish Marriage Vow" by Robert Smith and "Whilst Alexis Lay Pressed" by Nicholas Staggins, both set to Dryden's lyrics and printed in the 1673 book Choice Songs and Ayres for One Voyce to Sing to the Theorbo-Lute or Bass-Viol.

== Characters ==
- Polydamas, Usurper of Sicily.
- Leonidas, the rightful Prince, unknown.
- Argaleon, favourite to Polydamas.
- Hermogenes, foster-father to Leonidas.
- Eubulus, his friend and companion.
- Rhodphil, captain of the guards.
- Palamede, a courtier.
- Palmyra, daughter to the Usurper.
- Amalthea, sister to Argaleon.
- Doralice, wife to Rhodophil.
- Melantha, an affected lady.
- Philotis, woman to Melantha.
- Beliza, woman to Doralice.
- Artemis, a court lady.

== Plot synopsis ==
The setting is in Sicily. The plot concerns two separate storylines, one a romance between Palmyra and Leonidas, who were separated from their parents as babies and who were raised together by Hermogenes, who has kept their past a secret. When Hermogenes is recognized by the usurper-king Polydamas, he declares that Leonidas is Polydamas's son. However, as Leonidas's new position of prince then forbids him to marry Palmyra, much misery is brought to the couple. When the lovers refuse to stop seeing each other, Palmyra is sentenced to death. Hermogenes then steps forward and reveals that he was lying before: in fact Leonidas is his own son, he says, and he had lied in the hopes of bettering the boy by making him prince, whereas Palmyra is the real child of Polydamas. After offering proof of this new claim, Palmyra is established as princess, but again this prevents her and Leonidas from marrying. Hermogenes eventually admits that he once again was withholding information, and reveals the whole truth to Leonidas—Leonidas is the son of the rightful king, whose throne was usurped by Polydamas. As soon as he learns this, Leonidas forms a rebellion against Polydamas, wins, and establishes himself the new king, finally allowing himself and Palmyra to be married.

The second storyline, which intertwines with the first, concerns Rhodophil and his friend Palamede. Palamede has fallen in love with Rhodophil's wife Doralice, and Rhodophil is in love with Palamede's fiancée Melantha. Each of the women seem to find their pursuers agreeable, and great care is taken by all parties to keep their meetings secret from each other, with disastrous results as the two couples seem to always choose the same locations and tactics for meeting. When finally the actions of everyone are discovered, Palamede and Rhodophil decide that since their tastes in women are so similar, each would be best sticking to his rightful claim. Palamede then manages to win the heart of Melantha, and amicably break off his relationship with Doralice.

== Sources ==
Dryden borrowed from two plays by John Fletcher and his collaborators for Marriage À-la-Mode. He adapted its main plot from Beggars' Bush and its subplot from Rule a Wife and Have a Wife.

== Production history ==
The King's Company first performed Marriage à la Mode in London in 1673. William Wintershall played Polydamas, Edward Kynaston was Leonidas, Michael Mohun was Rhodophil, Edward Lydall was Argaleon, Marmaduke Watson was Eubulus and Nicholas Burt was Palamede; the role of Hermogenes was taken by William Cartwright the younger. Elizabeth Cox played Palmyra, Rebecca Marshall played Doralice, Elizabeth James was Amalthea, and Elizabeth Boutell was Melantha.

Arthur Hutchings composed a comic opera based on the play in 1956.
