= Richard Bell (actor) =

English actor

Richard Bell (died 1672) was an English stage actor. He joined the King's Company based at the Theatre Royal, Drury Lane (then located in Bridges Street, modern Catherine Street) in 1668. Considered a promising actor he appeared in the premieres of two plays by John Dryden and William Wycherley's debut Love in a Wood. His career was cut short when he was killed in a fire that destroyed the Bridges Street theatre on 25 January 1672. A planned role for him in Wycherley's new play The Gentleman Dancing Master had to be cut.

== Selected roles ==
- Frapolo in The Sisters by James Shirley (1668)
- Christophero in The Island Princess by John Fletcher (1668)
- Amariel in Tyrannick Love by John Dryden (1669)
- Honorius in The Roman Empress by William Joyner (1670)
- Duke of Arcos in The Conquest of Granada by John Dryden (1670)
- Sanco in The Generous Enemies by John Corye (1671)
- Vincent in Love in a Wood by William Wycherley (1671)
- Julius Caesar in Julius Caesar by William Shakespeare (1672)

== Bibliography ==
- McCarthy, B. Eugene. William Wycherley: A Biography. Ohio University Press, 1979.
- Van Lennep, W. The London Stage, 1660-1800: Volume One, 1660-1700. Southern Illinois University Press, 1960.
- Wilson, John Harold. Mr. Goodman the Player. University of Pittsburgh Press, 1964.
