= 1672 in literature =

Events from the year 1672 in literature.

== Events ==
- January 25 – London's Theatre Royal, Drury Lane, is destroyed by fire. The King's Company moves to the theatre at Lincoln's Inn Fields, which the rival Duke's Company left the previous year.
- June – Thomas Killigrew mounts another all-female production of his The Parson's Wedding with the King's Company. (The first occurred in 1664.) Beaumont and Fletcher's Philaster and Dryden's The Maiden Queen are also staged with all-women casts and new prologues by Dryden for the productions.
- September 13 – John Bunyan is released after twelve years' imprisonment for preaching without a licence.
- December – John Dryden's play Marriage à la Mode is first performed in London by the King's Company.
- The Mercure de France is first published, under the title Mercure galant.

== New books ==
=== Prose ===
- Nicolás Antonio – Bibliotheca Hispana Nova
- Nicolas Denys – Description Géographique et Historique des Costes de l’Amérique Septentrionale (Description and Natural History of the Coasts of North America)
- Richard Cumberland – De legibus naturae (On natural laws)
- Melchor Fuster – Conceptos predicables
- Gadla Walatta Petros (Ethiopian hagiography in Ge'ez language)
- Nathaniel Hodges – Loimologia
- James Janeway – A Token for Children, Part 2
- John Milton – Art of Logic
- Pierre Nicole – A Discourse Against Plays and Romances
- César Vichard de Saint-Réal – Dom Carlos

=== Drama ===
- Anonymous – Emilia (adapted from the Costanza di Rosamondo of Aurelio Aureli)
- Anonymous – The Illustrious Slaves
- Pedro Calderon de la Barca
  - Eco y Narciso
  - El hijo del sol, Faetón
  - La niña de Gómez Arias
- Thomas Corneille – Ariane
- John Dryden
  - The Assignation
  - Marriage à la mode (first performed; published the following year)
- John Lacy (published)
  - The Dumb Lady, or The Farrier Made Physician
  - The Old Troop, or Monsier Ragou
- Molière – Les Femmes Savantes
- Henry Nevil Payne – The Morning Ramble
- Jean Racine – Bajazet
- Edward Ravenscroft – The Citizen Turned Gentleman
- Thomas Shadwell
  - Epsom Wells
  - The Miser
- George Villiers, 2nd Duke of Buckingham, and others – The Rehearsal (published)

=== Poetry ===
- Miguel de Barrios – El coro de las musas

== Births ==
- January 18 – Antoine Houdar de la Motte, French writer, (died 1731)
- March – Sir Richard Steele, Irish dramatist, satirist and politician (died 1729)
- May 1 – Joseph Addison, English essayist, poet and politician (died 1719)
- August 2 – Johann Jakob Scheuchzer, Swiss paleontologist, historian and travel writer (died 1733)
- October 27 – Maria Gustava Gyllenstierna, Swedish writer (died 1737)

== Deaths ==
- June 14 – Matthew Wren, English scholar and cleric (born 1629)
- June 20 – Alonso Andrada, Spanish biographer and ascetic writer (born 1590)
- September 12 – Tanneguy Le Fèvre, French classicist (born 1615)
- September 16 – Anne Bradstreet, pioneering American female author (born c. 1612)
- November 21 – Robert Creighton, Scottish classicist, politician and bishop (born 1593)
- December 27 – Jacques Rohault, French philosopher (born 1618)
