= Elizabeth James =

English actress

Elizabeth James was an English stage actress of the seventeenth century. She was a member of the King's Company, based at the Theatre Royal, Drury Lane. Several of her known performances were in the premieres of work by John Dryden. She also featured in the debut of William Wycherley's The Country Wife in 1675. Her last known stage role was in 1676, although it appears she was still in the public eye more than a decade later.

== Selected roles ==
- Damilcar in Tyrannick Love by John Dryden (1669)
- Isabella in The Conquest of Granada by John Dryden (1670)
- Alleria in The Generous Enemies by John Corye (1671)
- Isabel in Love in a Wood by William Wycherley (1671)
- Amalthea in Marriage à la mode by John Dryden (1672)
- Sophronia in The Assignation by John Dryden (1672)
- Julia in Amboyna by John Dryden (1673)
- Arabella in The Amorous Old Woman by Thomas Duffett (1674)
- Bianca in Othello by William Shakespeare (1675)
- Aurana in Love in the Dark by Francis Fane (1675)
- Mrs Alithea in The Country Wife by William Wycherley (1675)
- Julia in Gloriana by Nathaniel Lee (1676)

== Bibliography ==
- Highfill, Philip H, Burnim, Kalman A. & Langhans, Edward A. A Biographical Dictionary of Actors, Actresses, Musicians, Dancers, Managers & Other Stage Personnel in London, 1660–1800:. SIU Press, 1982.
- Lanier, Henry Wysham. The First English Actresses: From the Initial Appearance of Women on the Stage in 1660 Till 1700. The Players, 1930.
- Van Lennep, W. The London Stage, 1660–1800: Volume One, 1660–1700. Southern Illinois University Press, 1960.
