= Sertorius (Bancroft play) =

1679 play by John Bancroft

The Tragedy of Sertorius
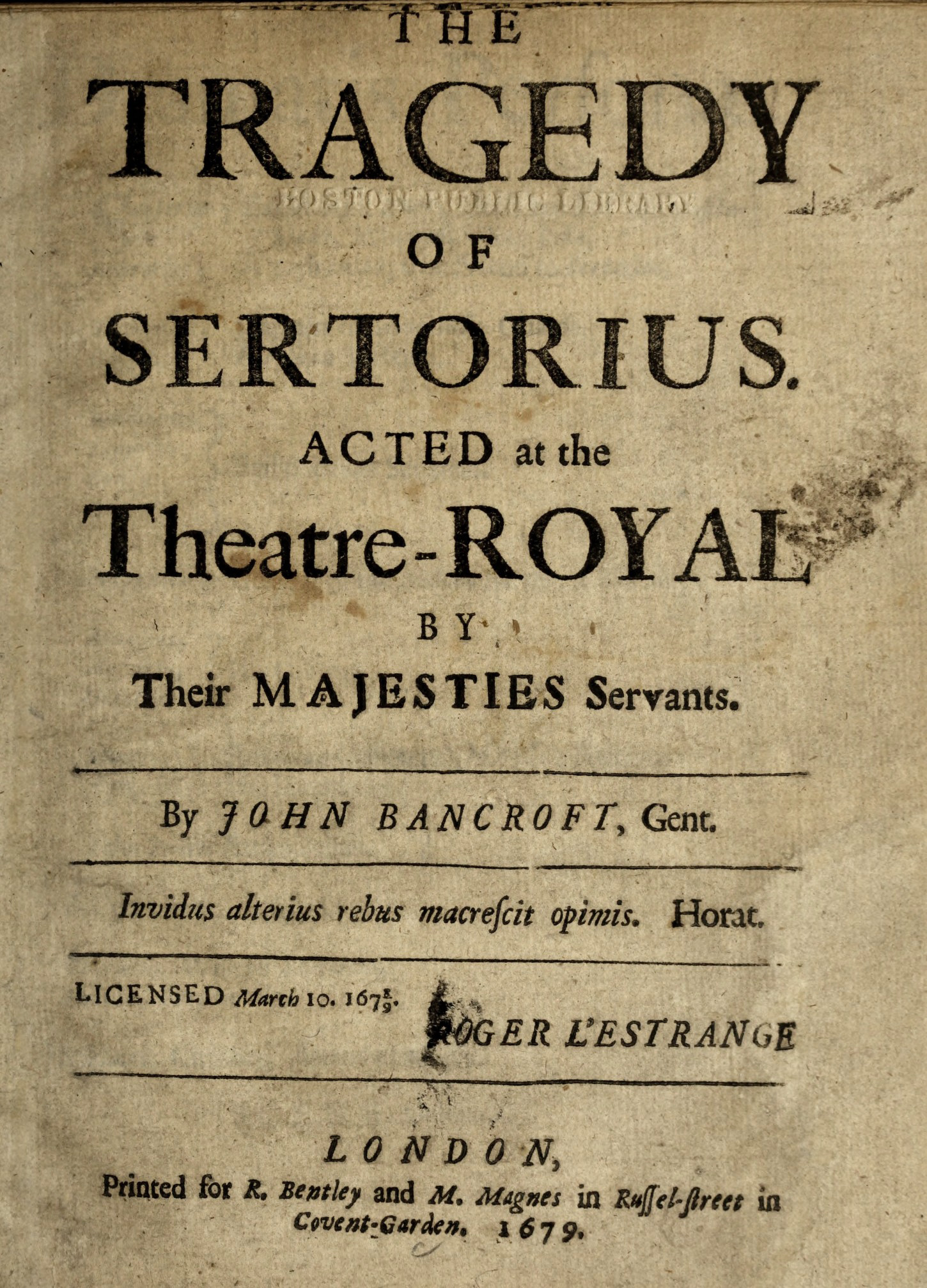
- Title page of the first edition (1679)
- Written by: John Bancroft
- Original language: English
- Genre: Tragedy
- Setting: Roman Republic, 1st Century BC

Premiere
- Date premiered: March 1679
- Place premiered: Theatre Royal, Drury Lane, London

The Tragedy Of Sertorius is a 1679 tragedy by the English writer John Bancroft. It was first performed by the King's Company at the Theatre Royal, Drury Lane. The original cast are unknown. It is based on the life of Quintus Sertorius who led a rebellion against the Roman Republic.

== Bibliography ==
- Depledge, Emma Shakespeare's Rise to Cultural Prominence: Politics, Print and Alteration, 1642–1700. Cambridge University Press, 2018.
- Van Lennep, W. The London Stage, 1660-1800: Volume One, 1660-1700. Southern Illinois University Press, 1960.
