= Heroic drama =

Literary genre

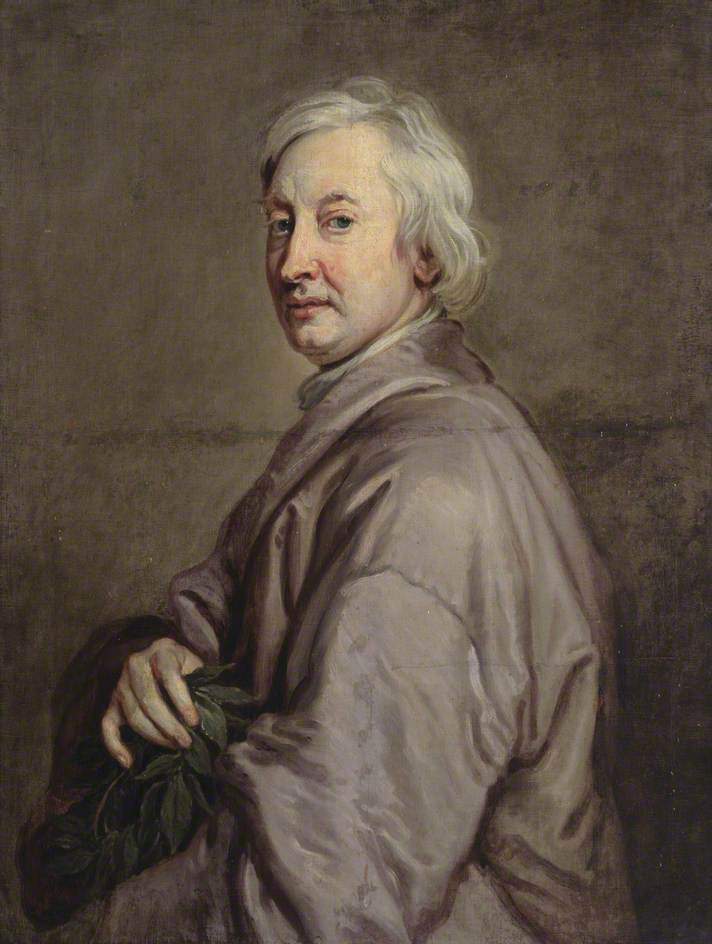
John Dryden, who formulated and wrote the heroic drama in the 1670s.

Heroic drama is a type of play popular during the Restoration era in England, distinguished by both its verse structure and its subject matter. The subgenre of heroic drama evolved through several works of the middle to later 1660s; John Dryden's The Indian Emperour (1665) and Roger Boyle's The Black Prince (1667) were key developments.

== Dryden in 1670 ==
The term "heroic drama" was invented by Dryden for his play, The Conquest of Granada (1670). For the Preface to the printed version of the play, Dryden argued that the drama was a species of epic poetry for the stage, that, as the epic was to other poetry, so the heroic drama was to other plays. Consequently, Dryden derived a series of rules for this type of play.

First, the play should be composed in heroic verse (closed couplets in iambic pentameter). Second, the play must focus on a subject that pertains to national foundations, mythological events, or important and grand matters. Third, the hero of the heroic drama must be powerful, decisive, and, like Achilles, dominating even when wrong. The Conquest of Granada followed all of these rules. The story was that of the national foundation of Spain (and King Charles II was known to be fond of Spanish plays), and the hero, Almanzor, was a man of great martial prowess and temperament.

Dryden's Conquest of Granada is often considered one of the better heroic tragedies, but his highest achievement is his adaptation (which he called All for Love, 1678) of Shakespeare's Anthony and Cleopatra to the heroic formula. Other heroic dramatists were Nathaniel Lee (The Rival Queens) and Thomas Otway, whose Venice Preserv'd is a fine tragedy that transcends the usual limitations of the form.

== Other dramatists ==
"Those who associate 'heroic drama' primarily with the use of the 'heroic couplet' usually set as its extent the years from 1664 to 1678. This, certainly, is its period of fullest development and authority. Those who prefer to accentuate the elements suggested by the very term 'heroic' rather than the strict rhymed verse form are willing to admit wider limits." Restoration plays by Sir William Davenant, Thomas Otway, Nathaniel Lee, John Crowne, Elkanah Settle, and John Banks, and later works by Nicholas Rowe and Joseph Addison, have been included in tighter or looser definitions of heroic drama.

== Heroic drama in literary criticism ==
Today, drama is divided up into numerous subgenres; Dryden, however, worked from Classical critics. There was little dramatic critical theory for him to appeal to, and the new rules brought over from France (particularly those of Corneille and Boileau) did not match English theatrical history or practice. The emphasis on unities and on maintaining only Classically proscribed dramatic forms also came from Thomas Rymer, who condemned the heterogeneity of the stage. Aristotle had only spoken of satire, epic, and tragedy, and Horace also wrote only of comedy, tragedy and satire, and so Dryden was seeking to square actual theatrical practice with an ancient framework for literature.

== Satirical response ==
George Villiers, 2nd Duke of Buckingham and others satirised heroic drama in The Rehearsal. The satire was successful enough that heroic drama largely disappeared afterwards. Buckingham attacked the stupidity of blustering, military heroes, as well as the apparent self-importance of attempting a dramatic entertainment about the serious subjects of military and national history.

Buckingham's criticism of Dryden in The Rehearsal is partly Dryden's bombastic verse but, more pointedly, Dryden's personal interest in creating a "pure" drama. The character of Bayes is ludicrous more for his hubris in damning actual plays in favour of imagined ones than he is for being a poetaster.
