= Antonio Abati =

Italian poet

- Born: c. 1600; Gubbio, Papal States
- Died: October 1667; Senigallia, Papal States
- Occupations: Poet; Writer
- Writing career
- Language: Italian
- Period: 17th century; Baroque literature
- Genres: Poetry; satire
- Notable works: Ragguaglio di Parnaso; Delle Frascherie, fasci tre
- Literary movement: Baroque; Marinism

Antonio Abati (c. 1600 – October 1667) was an Italian baroque poet. He was a member of several Italian literary academies, including the Umoristi (the Humorists), where he read his satire Ragguaglio di Parnaso (“Report from Parnassus”), dedicated to the bad poets of the times. Between 1634 and 1638, Abati was in Viterbo, where he made the acquaintance of Salvator Rosa. Rosa was in large part inspired to become a satirist by his example. His satires were first published in Venice in 1651 and went through a number of editions.

== Biography ==
Antonio Abati was born in Gubbio, an Umbrian town in the Papal States, about 1600. Though he was to spend most of his life in Rome and its provinces, Abati's earliest publications indicate a period spent in the Spanish territories of southern Italy.

He moved to Rome in 1631. By early 1636 he was already well-regarded enough to address the Roman Accademia degli Umoristi. It was here on 20 January of that year that he delivered the speech that was shortly to be published as Ragguaglio di Parnaso. A year later he contributed a poem to an anthology celebrating the election of Emperor Ferdinand III as King of the Romans. In 1638 he was in nearby Viterbo, where he began his friendship with Salvator Rosa.

From Rome and its surroundings Abati turned his attention further north. His friendship with Rosa led to several visits to Florence and Tuscany between 1638 and 1649. From 1641 to 1644 he was at the Habsburg court in Austria, where he enjoyed the favor of Ferdinand III and his brother, Archduke Leopold Wilhelm, who crowned him poet laureate. This Austrian sojourn was in turn followed by a trip to France and the Low Countries, which he had opportunity to describe in one of his comedies: Il Viaggio (“The Voyage”).

Abati returned to Italy in 1645, and resided mainly in Rome and its provinces. In his final years he enjoyed the patronage of the new papal nephew, Cardinal Flavio Chigi. Cardinal Chigi secured for Abati a series of provincial governorships in the Papal States (Grotte, Recanati and Frascati).

Towards the end of his life, Abati's Tuscan connections eased his final days. Vittoria della Rovere, wife of Ferdinando II de' Medici, gave the poet the use of a villa and farm in Senigallia, near her own ancestral home in Urbino. It was there that Abati died in October 1667. He led a merry life, his activity was well rewarded and he had the protection of powerful men (among whom was Emperor Ferdinand III). For his wit he was surnamed “l'Abbate delle Vivezze e delle Argutezze.” The Emperor Ferdinand III composed an acrostic in Italian in his praise. However, his writings fell out of favor during the Age of Enlightenment, and were strongly criticized by Baretti in his “Dissertation upon the Italian Poetry”.

His major work are the Frascherie, a collection of satires in the form of dialogues, published in Venice in 1651. The most well-known is Pegasino, which attacks the vices of poets of his time. He The bulk of Abati's poetry was first published posthumously by Giovanni Recaldini in 1671.

== Works ==
- Ragguaglio di Parnaso contra i poetastri e partigiani delle nationi. Milan, 1638, in-8°;
- Le Frascherie, fasci tre, a collection of satirical Poems mixed with Prose, Venice, 1651, in-8°;
- Poesie postume, Bologna, 1671, in-8°;
- Il Consiglio degli dei (The Council of the Gods), Bologna (1674) – composed in 1660.
