= John Corye =

English playwright

John Corye (or Corey; fl. 1667) was an English playwright of the Restoration. All that is known is that he lived in Charles II's reign, and produced one comedy, which is a plagiarism from various authors — Quinault, Corneille, Randolph, and Beaumont and Fletcher. It was produced in 1667, licensed in 1671, and published in 1672 under the title of The Generous Enemies; or, The Ridiculous Lovers.
