= John Lacy (playwright) =

17th-century English comic actor and playwright

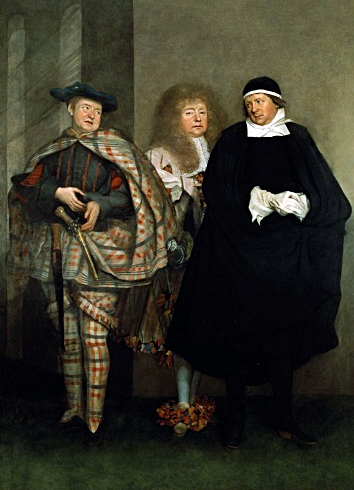
Triple portrait of John Lacy by John Michael Wright, 1668–70. Lacy is in three of his most celebrated roles. From left to right: the lead from Sauny the Scot: or The Taming of The Shrew (Lacy's own adaptation from Shakespeare performed at the Theatre Royal in 1667); Monsieur Device from The Country Chaplain (by the Duke of Newcastle); and Parson Scruple from The Cheats (by John Wilson)

John Lacy (c.1615? – 17 September 1681) was an English comic actor and playwright during the Restoration era. In his own time he gained a reputation as "the greatest comedian of his day" and was the favourite comic of King Charles II.

== Life ==
Lacy was born in or near Doncaster. He is thought to have been the son of John Lacy, musician (d. 1621), and had a sister, Elizabeth (born c. 1616), who later married Roger Parker. In 1631 Lacy became an apprentice of John Ogilby, when Ogilby was functioning as what was then called a "dancing master"—roughly the equivalent of a modern dance teacher and choreographer. Lacy's stage career began by 1639, when he was a member of Beeston's Boys.

Lacy joined the royalist forces in the English Civil War, and was commissioned an officer (lieutenant and quartermaster). After the English Interregnum period, once Charles II returned to the throne and the London theatres re-opened, he became an actor with the newly formed King's Company.

Lacy quickly evolved into a popular comedian; Samuel Pepys admired and enjoyed his work, as he recorded in his Diary. On 21 May 1662, Pepys saw Lacy in as the title character in a play called The French Dancing-Mistress; on the next day he saw Lacy as Johnny Thump in James Shirley's Love in a Maze. On 12 June 1663 Pepys saw Lacy in Sir Robert Howard's The Committee, and praised Lacy's acting in the role of the Irish footman Teague as "beyond imagination"; on 13 August 1667, Pepys saw the same play, and called Lacy's part "so well performed that it would set off anything." Pepys saw Lacy in his own Sauny the Scot on 9 April 1667.

Lacy was also known for the role of Galliard in the Duke of Newcastle's play The Variety, and Scruple in John Wilson's The Cheats. He played roles in Ben Jonson's comedies: Ananias in The Alchemist, Captain Otter in Epicene, and Sir Politic Would-Be in Volpone.

After a serious illness in 1668, Lacy recovered and returned to the stage, though he performed less often than before.

== Plays ==
Lacy is credited with the authorship of four plays:

- Sauny the Scot (acted 1667; printed 1698)
- The Dumb Lady, or The Farrier Made Physician (printed 1672)
- The Old Troop, or Monsier Ragou (printed 1672)
- Sir Hercules Buffoon, or The Poetical Squire (printed 1684).

Lacy was more of an adapter than an original artist, however (a not-unusual trait among Restoration dramatists). Sauny the Scot is a prose version of Shakespeare's The Taming of the Shrew. In Lacy's version, Grumio becomes Sauny, a clown who dominates the play, and a role played by Lacy himself. Sir Hercules Buffoon draws upon Philip Massinger's The City Madam and A New Way to Pay Old Debts. The Dumb Lady derives from Molière's Le Médecin malgré lui.

== Trouble ==
His popularity with Charles II did not prevent Lacy from getting into significant trouble at one point in his career. On 15 April 1667 Pepys saw Lacy play in The Change of Crowns, by Edward Howard. The King and Queen were in the audience, along with the Duke of York and his Duchess, and "all the Court". During the performance, Lacy improvised some lines about corruption at Court and the selling of offices. The King was so angry that he had the company banned from performing; and Lacy was incarcerated. Lacy was released on 20 April and had a confrontation with "Ned" Howard; Lacy unreasonably blamed Howard for the trouble he had got himself into with the King. The two theatre men came to blows: Howard hit Lacy in his face with a glove, and Lacy responded by striking Howard over the head with his cane.

The actors prevailed upon the King to allow them to return to the stage, and Lacy was soon forgiven.

== Personal life ==
Lacy lived with Mary Dickons, widow, from 1639 to 1649 – initially as a lodger, but subsequently as man and wife, although there is no convincing evidence that they ever in fact married. They lived in Westminster and later Oxford, and had seven children together. For a period after they parted, Lacy continued to support his children financially. He then began a relationship with Katherine Barnes, who bore him another child. Around 1656, under the pseudonym of "Sir John Burlacy", he allegedly began to court a wealthy woman named Penelope Long. By 1658, he had begun a relationship with Margaret Pinnyfather: they married in 1659, although they may have had a son as early as 1656, and they eventually had at least six children together.

From the late 1650s, in an attempt to extract further money from Lacy, Mary Dickons began a series of legal actions, culminating in a protracted case in the ecclesiastical Court of Arches in 1663–1665: she claimed that she and Lacy had married in or near the parish of St Clement Danes in 1639. The judge found that they had not (and that Lacy's marriage to Margaret Pinnyfather was therefore legitimate); but that Dickons had had reasonable grounds for bringing her action, so that Lacy was required to pay her legal costs of £80. He failed to pay for 18 months, leading to a threat of excommunication; but there is no evidence of any further proceedings, suggesting that he did eventually pay.

According to Sir George Etheredge, Lacy was the lover of Nell Gwyn along with the King's Company star Charles Hart.
