= Volpone =

Comedy play by Ben Jonson

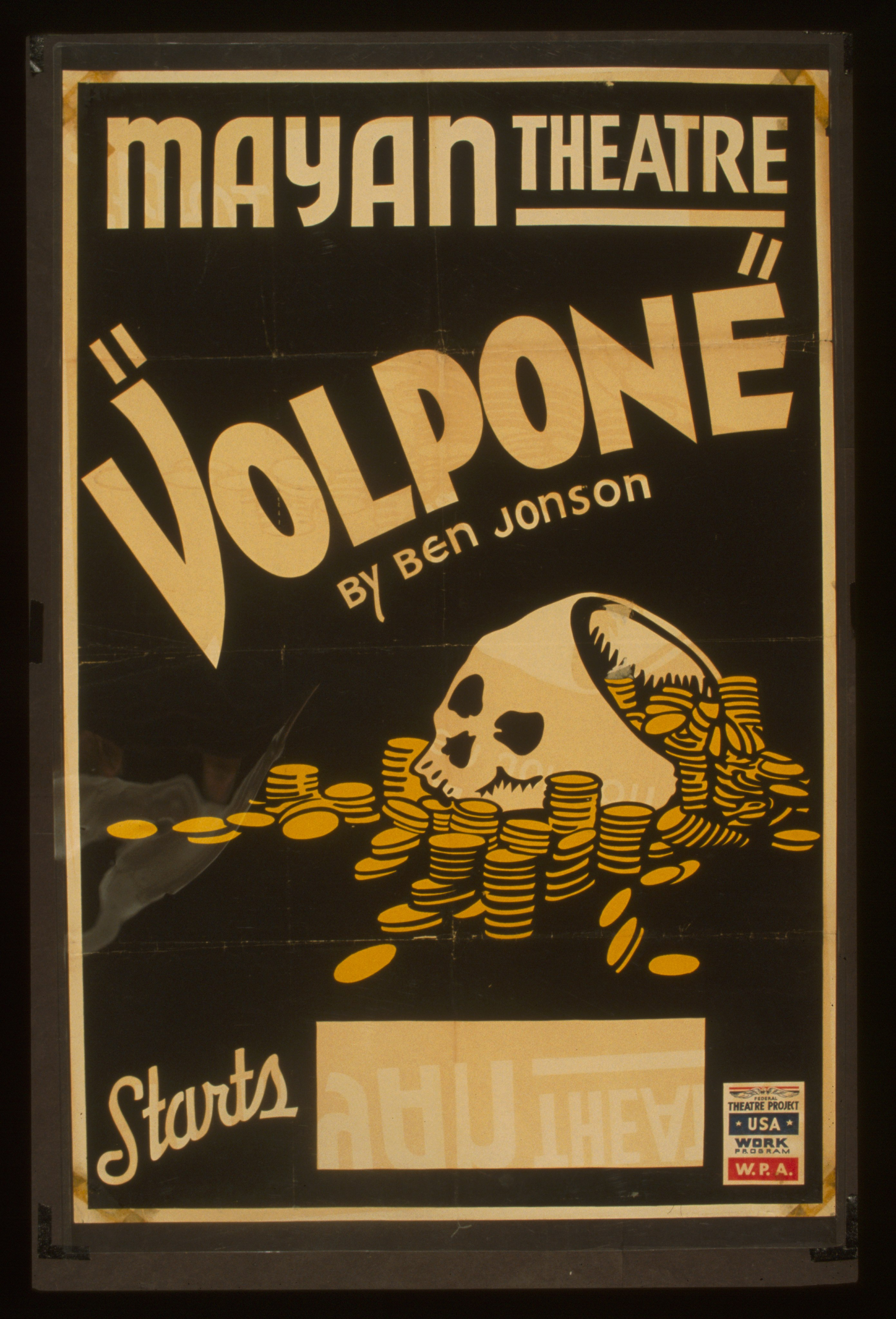
- Poster for a 1939 production, part of the Federal Theatre Project
- Original language: Early Modern English
- Written by: Ben Jonson
- Subject: greed, lust
- Genre: comedy, city comedy
- Setting: Venice, Renaissance period

Premiere
- Date: Spring 1606
- Place: Globe Theatre, London

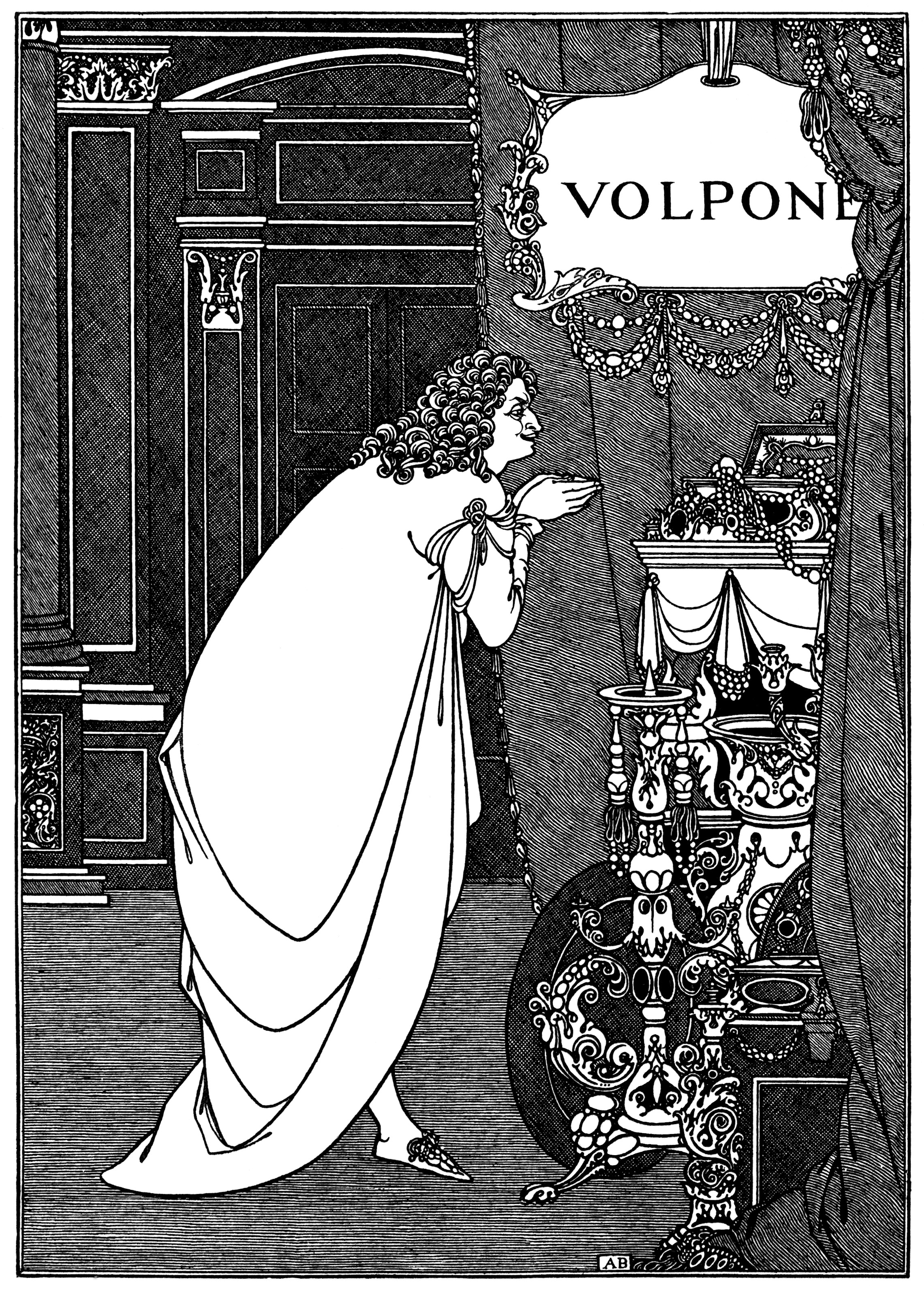
An illustration for an 1898 edition of Volpone by Aubrey Beardsley.

Volpone ([volˈpoːne], Italian for "sly fox") is a comedy play by English playwright Ben Jonson first produced in 1605–1606, drawing on elements of city comedy and beast fable. A merciless satire of greed and lust, it remains Jonson's most-performed play, and it is ranked among the finest Jacobean-era comedies.

== Characters ==
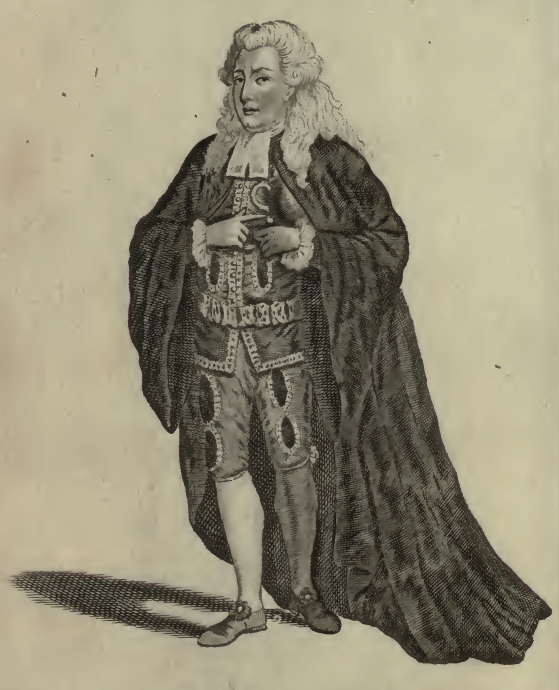
Thomas Hull in costume as Voltore, 1780

- Volpone (the Sly Fox) – a greedy and rich childless Venetian magnifico
- Mosca (the Fly) – his servant
- Voltore (the Vulture) – a lawyer
- Corbaccio (the Raven) – an avaricious old miser
- Bonario – Corbaccio's son
- Corvino (the Carrion Crow) – a merchant
- Celia – Corvino's wife
- Sir Politic Would-Be – ridiculous Englishman and husband of Lady Would-Be
- Lady Would-Be (the parrot) – English lady and wife of Sir Politic Would-Be
- Peregrine ("Pilgrim") – another, more sophisticated, English traveller
- Nano – a dwarf, companion of Volpone
- Androgyno – a hermaphrodite, companion of Volpone
- Castrone – a eunuch, companion of Volpone
- The Avocatori – the judges of Venice

== Synopsis ==
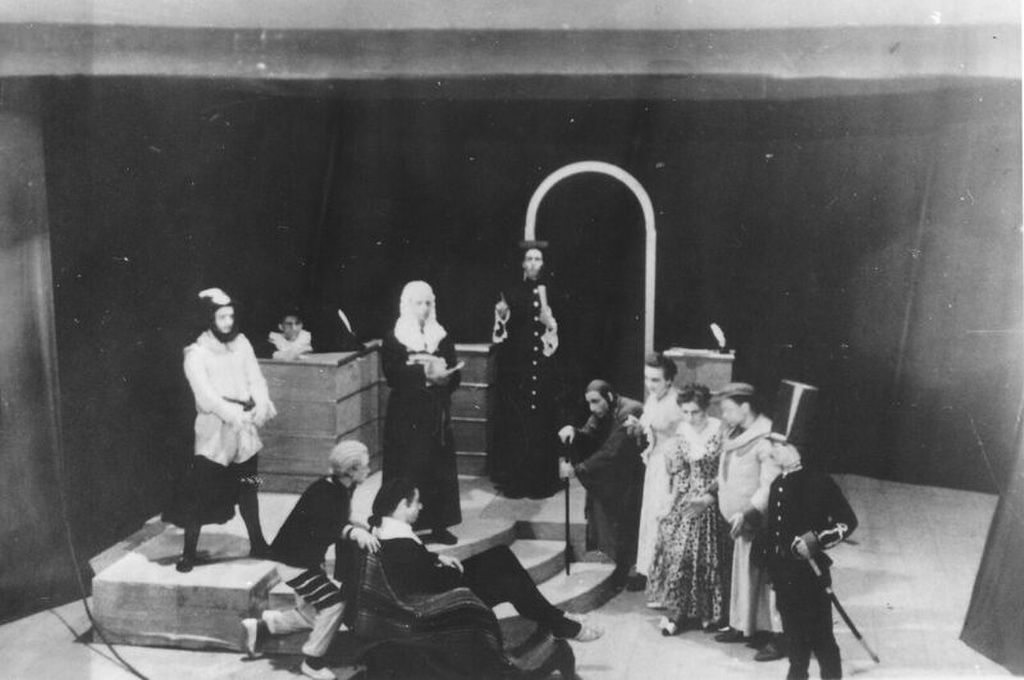
Production in Ptuj, 1940.

Volpone (The Fox) is a Venetian gentleman who pretends to be on his deathbed after a long illness in order to dupe Voltore (The Vulture), Corbaccio (The Raven) and Corvino (The Crow), three men who aspire to inherit his fortune. In their turns, each man arrives at Volpone's house bearing a luxurious gift, intent upon having his name inscribed to the will of Volpone, as his heir. Mosca (The Fly), Volpone's parasite servant, encourages each of the visitors to believe that he has been named heir to Volpone's fortune. Mosca even persuades Corbaccio to disinherit his own son in favour of Volpone.

To Volpone, Mosca mentions that Corvino has a beautiful wife, Celia. Disguised as Scoto the Mountebank, Volpone goes to see Celia. Corvino drives away "Scoto" (Volpone), who then becomes insistent that he must possess Celia as his own. Mosca deceives Corvino into believing that the moribund Volpone will be cured of his illness if he lies in bed beside a young woman. Believing that Volpone has been rendered impotent by his illness, Corvino offers his wife in order that, when he is revived, Volpone will recognise Corvino as his sole heir.

Just before Corvino and Celia are due to arrive at Volpone's house, Corbaccio's son Bonario arrives to catch his father in the act of disinheriting him. Mosca guides Bonario to a sideroom, and Volpone and Celia are left alone. Upon failing to seduce Celia with fantastic promises of luxury and wealth, Volpone attempts to rape her. Bonario comes forward to rescue Celia. In the ensuing trial at court, the truth of the matter is well-buried by Voltore, using his prowess as a lawyer to convince the Avocatori, with false evidence given by Mosca, Volpone and the other dupes.

There are episodes involving the English travellers Sir and Lady Politic Would-Be and Peregrine. Sir Politic constantly talks of plots and his outlandish business plans, while Lady Would-Be annoys Volpone with her ceaseless talking. Mosca co-ordinates a mix-up between them which leaves Peregrine, a more sophisticated traveller, feeling offended. He humiliates Sir Politic by telling him he is to be arrested for sedition and making him hide inside a giant tortoise shell.

Volpone insists on disguising himself and having it announced that he has died and willed his wealth to Mosca, which enrages the would-be heirs Voltore, Corbaccio and Corvino, and everyone returns to court to dispute the will of Volpone, who becomes entangled in the circumstances of the plots that he and Mosca devised. Despite Volpone's pleas, Mosca refuses to relinquish his new role as a rich man. Volpone reveals himself and his deceits in order to topple the rich Mosca. In the event, Voltore, Corbaccio, Corvino, Mosca and Volpone himself finally are punished.

== Text ==
The play appeared in quarto in early 1607, printed by George Eld for publisher Thomas Thorpe. The quarto contains Jonson's dedication to Oxford and Cambridge, as well as a great number of commendatory verses, in English and Latin, by fellow-poets such as Francis Beaumont and John Fletcher. Its next appearance was in the folio of 1616, and the latter, presumably having been subject to Jonson's careful review, forms the basis of most modern editions.

== Productions ==
The play premiered at the Globe Theatre in Spring 1606. It was performed by the King's Men, but casting is uncertain. John Lowin may have performed the title role, as he is associated with the role in James Wright's Historia Histrionica (1699). William Gifford hypothesized that Alexander Cooke may have played Lady Would-be. Either that summer or the next, an outbreak of plague closed the London theatres, and the company performed the play at Oxford and Cambridge. Jonson may have added the first act's satire on Pythagoras for these audiences. The play certainly remained in the King's Men's repertoire throughout the period. It was performed for Charles in 1624 while he was still Prince of Wales, in 1630, and again at the Cockpit-in-Court in 1637.

After the Restoration, the play enjoyed a lengthy prominence: John Genest records over fifty performances before 1770. John Evelyn saw it performed at the court of Charles II on 16 October 1662. When the theatres reopened, the play was owned by the King's Men of Thomas Killigrew; it was performed at Drury Lane in 1663. Michael Mohun played Volpone to Hart's Mosca; Katherine Corey played Celia, and Rebecca Marshall played Lady Would-be. The same cast was seen by Samuel Pepys in 1665.

The play continued in performance throughout the 18th century. Richard Steele mentions a performance in a 1709 edition of Tatler. Famous eighteenth-century Volpones included James Quin; famous Moscas included Charles Macklin. Colley Cibber played Corvino in his productions; his wife Katherine Shore played Celia, as later did Elizabeth Inchbald. As with many other Jacobean plays, Volpone had lost its appeal before the end of the 18th century. Earlier in the century, critics had complained about the improbability of the fifth act, frequently likened to farce, and to Jonson's highly Latinate language. An updated version by George Colman the Elder failed at Drury Lane in 1771. By the end of the century, the objections appeared insurmountable to producers, and the play fell into disuse.

The play was revived by the Phoenix Society at the Lyric Hammersmith in 1921; W. B. Yeats was in the audience and mentions the production approvingly in a letter to Allan Wade. The Birmingham Repertory Theatre staged the play at the Malvern Festival in 1935.

A 1938 production introduced two of the dominant elements of twentieth-century productions: the performance of Donald Wolfit and animal imagery. Wolfit's dynamic performance in the title role, repeated several times over the next decades, set the standard for modern interpretations of Volpone: Politick's plot was truncated or eliminated, and Mosca (played in 1938 by Alan Wheatley) relegated to a secondary role.

The play has since been staged by a number of famous companies. In 1952, George Devine directed Anthony Quayle (Mosca) and Ralph Richardson (Volpone) at the Stratford Memorial Theatre. At the same theatre in 1955, Eric Porter played Volpone. In 1968, Sir Tyrone Guthrie's National Theatre production emphasized the beast-fable motif; this production featured stage design by Tanya Moiseiwitsch. In the same year, David Raeburn directed a modern dress performance featuring rock music settings of the songs at Beckenham Boys Grammar.

In 1972, the play was staged at the Bristol Old Vic. A most memorable production of the 1970s was Peter Hall's staging for the Royal National Theatre in 1974, with Paul Scofield as Volpone, Ben Kingsley as Mosca, Sir John Gielgud as Sir Politick, and Ian Charleson as Peregrine. In 1971, the Stratford Festival mounted a Canadian production directed by David William, with William Hutt in the title role and Douglas Rain as Mosca.

Matthew Warchus received an Olivier Award nomination for his 1995 production at the Royal National Theatre; it featured Michael Gambon and Simon Russell Beale.

== Adaptations ==
Volpone was adapted by Jules Romains and Stefan Zweig. Their French-language version was produced in 1928, with the ending changed so that Mosca ends up with Volpone's money. This version was used by George Antheil in his 1953 opera Volpone.

In 1941 a French film version was released, under the direction of noted filmmaker Maurice Tourneur. Begun in 1938 by Jacques de Baroncelli, the production shut down because of financial difficulties. Tourneur took over and the shooting resumed in 1940. This version also used portions of the adaptation by Romains and Zweig.

An adaptation by Alphons Silbermann ran at the Independent Theatre, Sydney from 3 April to 21 June 1947.

Wally Pone, King of Soho, Lionel Bart's musical adaptation, ran for eight weeks at London's Unity Theatre from 18 July 1958.

A short-lived 1964 Broadway musical adaptation entitled Foxy moved the play's setting to the Yukon during the gold rush of 1898.

It was adapted for Australian television in 1968.

The stage adaptation Sly Fox, by Larry Gelbart, updated the setting from Renaissance Venice to 19th century San Francisco, and changed the tone from satire to farce.

The Honey Pot is a 1967 film by Joseph L. Mankiewicz based on Volpone, although with a romantic subplot and sentimental trappings. It featured Rex Harrison in the main role, Cliff Robertson as Mosca ("McFly"), and Maggie Smith as the love interest. A portion of the original play is presented in private performance for Harrison's character, who states that it is his favourite.

In France, there have been three further video and DVD adaptations of Volpone based on versions of the Stefan Zweig/Jules Romains script: in 1978, Jean Meyer directed a production in the 'théâtre de boulevard' style for the Théâtre de Marigny and Panorama (Au Théâtre ce soir), starring himself as Corbaccio, Jean Le Poulain as Volpone, Francis Huster as Mosca and Claude Jade as Colomba (Celia). This was followed in 2001 by a production directed by Francis Perrin with a script that resembles the Zweig/Romains text but rewritten in pseudo-Elizabethan style by Jean Collette and Toni Cecchinato. Bernard Haller plays the part of Volpone, Francis Perrin plays Mosca, and Thibaut Lorain plays Lady Would-Be. In 2003, the play was rewritten for television by Éric-Emmanuel Schmitt for a production starring Gérard Depardieu as Volpone and Daniel Prévost as Mosca. The ending is changed to see Volpone and Mosca escaping together with Corbaccio's wife.

In 1974 György Fehér adapted the play for the Hungarian Television with title Volpone. Volpone was played by Tamás Major.

In 1988 the play was adapted for Italian cinema by Maurizio Ponzi, with the title Il volpone. Set in modern Liguria, it features Paolo Villaggio as Ugo Maria Volpone and Enrico Montesano as Bartolomeo Mosca.

On 24 March 2004, Ian McDiarmid starred as Volpone in a BBC Radio 3 production directed by Peter Kavanagh that included Tom Hollander as Mosca, Malcolm Sinclair as Corvino, Patrick Barlow as Voltore and John Rowe as Corbacchio.

In 2004 the Wolf Trap Opera Company, Vienna, Virginia, commissioned and produced a new opera based on the play. The score was written by John Musto with libretto by Mark Campbell. The world premiere took place at The Barns at Wolf Trap on 10 March 2004. The opera was produced again in 2007 by the Wolf Trap Opera Company with a new cast featuring Joshua Jeremiah, Jeremy Little, Faith Sherman, and Lisa Hopkins. This production was recorded live at The Barns at Wolf Trap for Wolf Trap Recordings and was nominated for the 2010 Grammy Award for Best Opera Recording.
