= William Chamberlayne (poet) =

English poet (1619–1679)

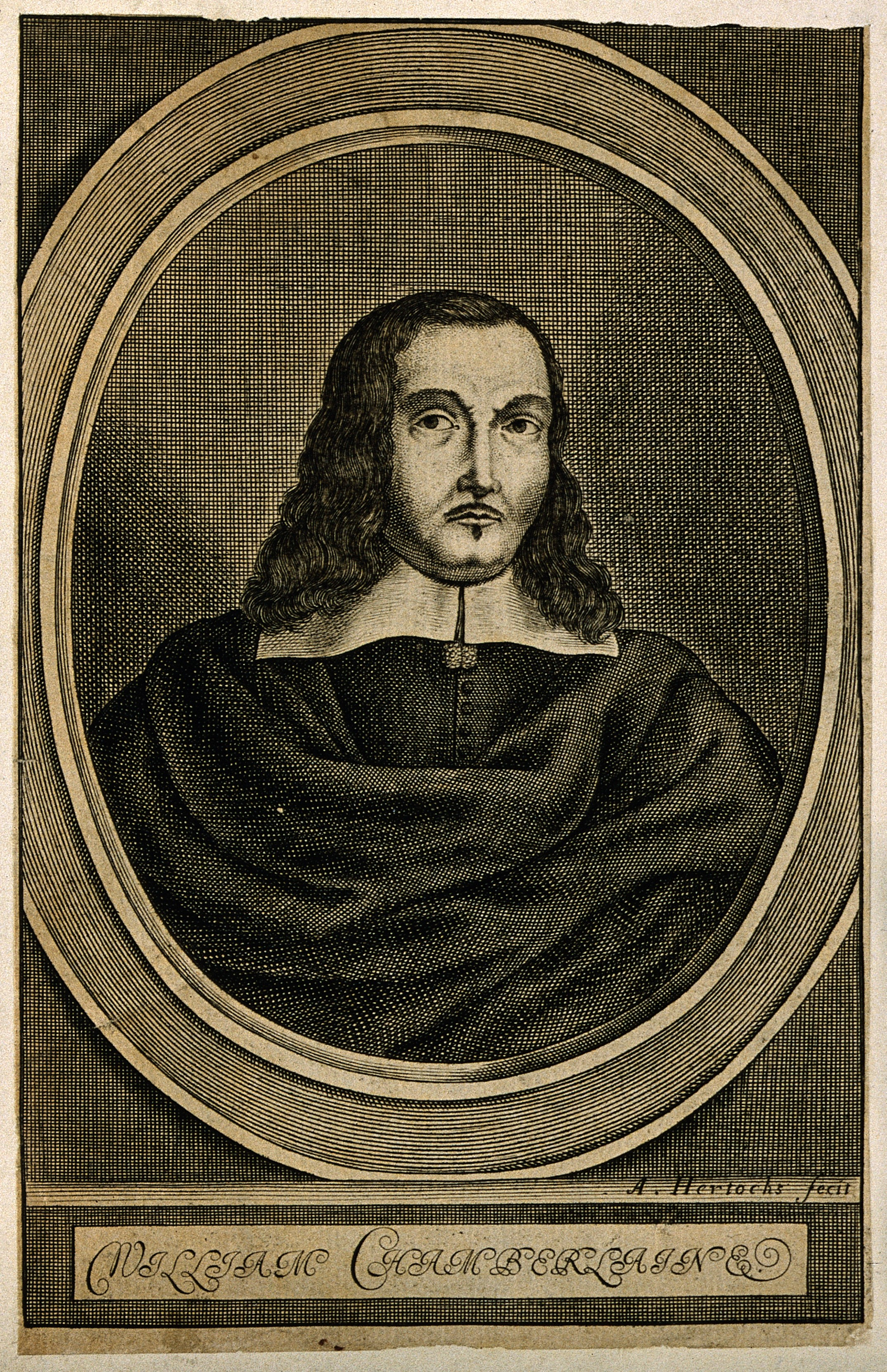
William Chamberlayne line engraving by A. Hertocks, 1659

William Chamberlayne (1619 – 11 July 1679 or 1689) was an English poet.

Nothing is known of his history except that he practiced as a physician at Shaftesbury in Dorset and fought on the Royalist side at the Second Battle of Newbury.

His works are:

- Pharonnida (1659), a verse romance in five books
- Love's Victory (1658), a tragi-comedy, acted under another title in 1678 at the Theatre Royal
- England's Jubilee (1660), a poem in honour of the Restoration

A prose version of Pharonnida, entitled Eromena, or the Noble Stranger, appeared in 1683.

In 1677 his play Wits Led by the Nose, a comedy, was staged at the Theatre Royal, Drury Lane by the King's Company.

Robert Southey speaks of him as "a poet to whom I am indebted for many hours of delight." Pharonnida was reprinted by S. W. Singer in 1820 and again in 1905 by George Saintsbury in Minor Poets of the Caroline Period (vol. i). The poem is loose in construction but contains some passages of great beauty. It is one of the longest poems in the English language, at 13,000 lines. Edmund Gosse notes some influence of Pharonnida on Keats' Endymion.
