= William Cartwright (actor) =

17th-century actor and bookseller

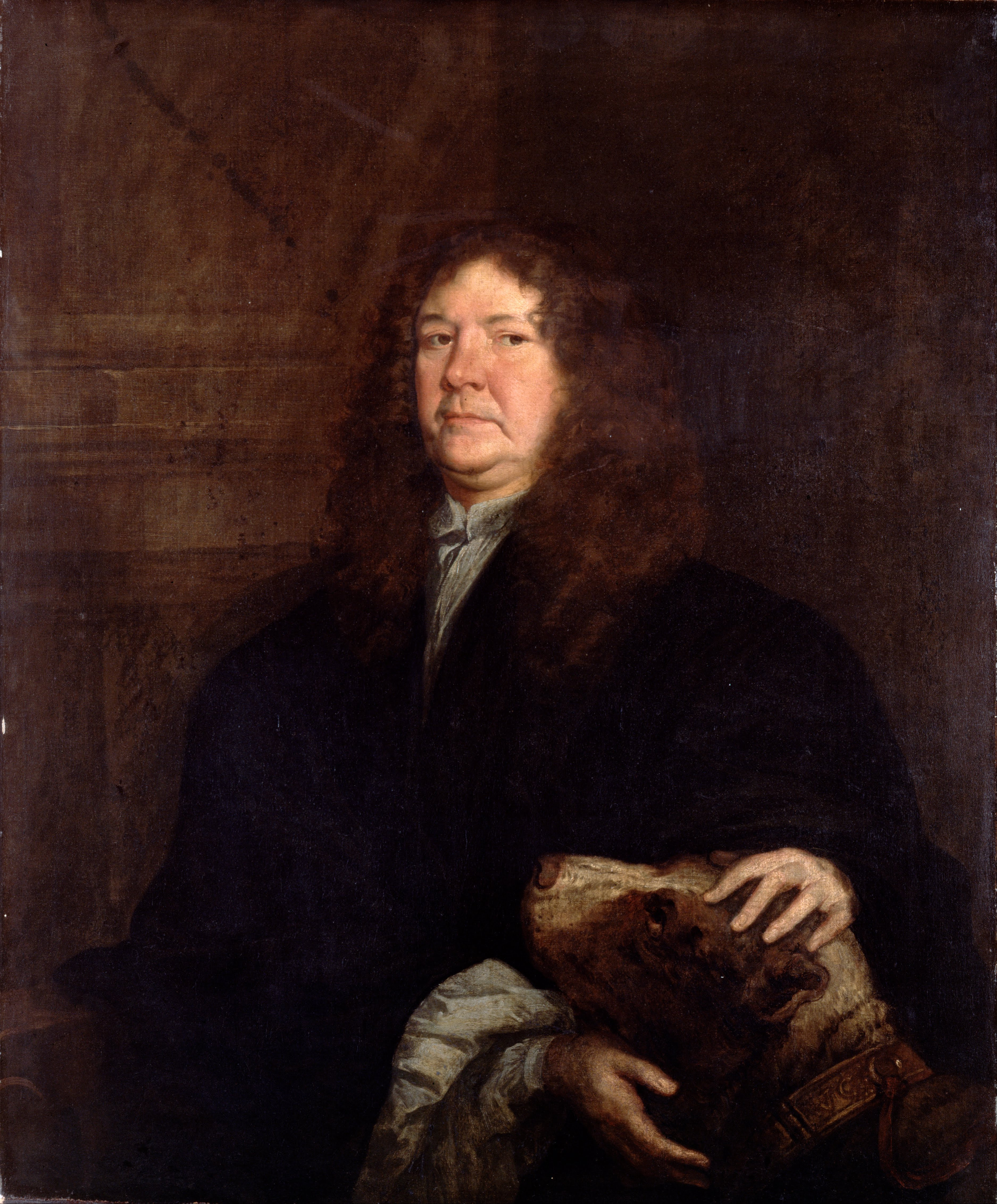
William Cartwright

William Cartwright (died 17 December 1686) was an English actor of the seventeenth century, whose career spanned the Caroline era to the Restoration. He is sometimes known as William Cartwright, Junior or William Cartwright the younger to distinguish him from his father, another William Cartwright (fl. 1598 – 1636), an actor of the previous generation.

== Early career ==
William Cartwright the younger was about eighty years old when he died; he was therefore born around 1606 or 1607. Nothing is known of his early life; it is reasonable to assume that he began his stage career under his father's tutelage. He was included with his father on a 1635 list of actors; apparently they both belonged to the King's Revels Men at that time. James Wright's Historia Histrionica (1699) maintains that the younger Cartwright was associated with the Salisbury Court Theatre — which may refer to his time with his father's troupe, or may indicate that he was with Queen Henrietta's Men in the 1637–42 period.

The parish records of St. Giles in the Fields show that he married his first wife, Elisabeth Cooke, on 1 May 1633 — and his second wife, Andria Robins, just three years later, on 28 April 1636.

== Theatre closure ==
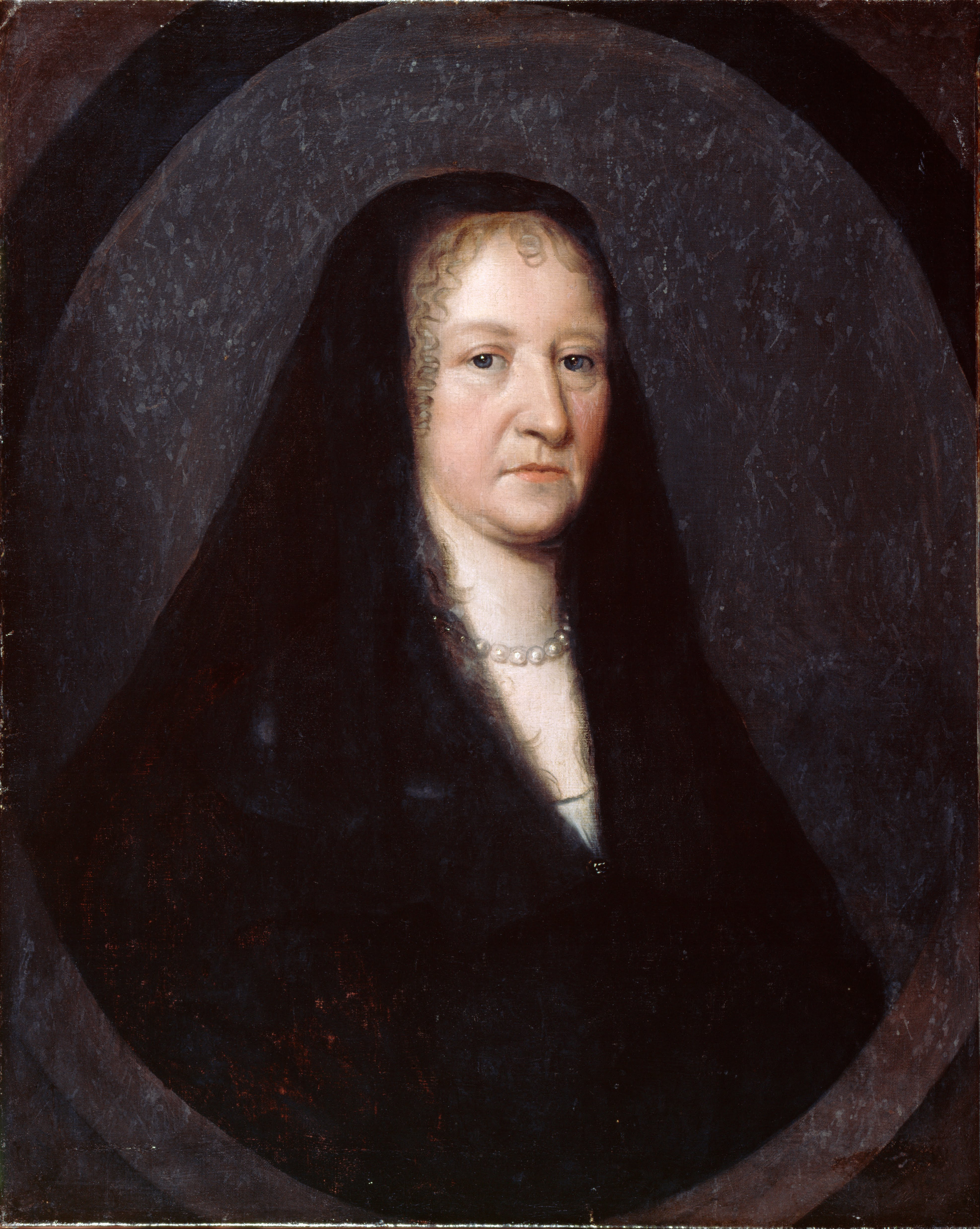
Jane Cartwright

For the years 1642–1660, when the theatres were closed, evidence of the activities of the former actors is scanty. It is known, however, that Cartwright was one of those who tried to maintain clandestine dramatic activity in the later 1640s. He then became a stationer or bookseller; his shop was in Turnstile Alley in the neighborhood of Lincoln's Inn Fields. Other former actors, Andrew Pennycuicke and Alexander Gough, also shifted into the book business in the Commonwealth period.

In this era, booksellers also functioned as publishers; but evidence of only one publication by Cartwright is extant. In 1658 he issued a new edition of Thomas Heywood's An Apology for Actors (originally printed in 1612), under the title The Actor's Vindication. Cartwright made one major addition to Heywood's text: a passage in praise of Edward Alleyn, with whom his father had been associated.

Cartwright's second wife Andria was buried on 12 May 1652. He married Jane Hodgson, his third wife, on 19 November 1654.

== Restoration ==
Cartwright's stage career revived with the re-opening of the theatres in 1660. He was one of the thirteen actors who were the original "sharers" (partners) in the King's Company when Thomas Killigrew organized that troupe. Cartwright remained with the company until it was absorbed into the United Company in 1682.

Cartwright performed a range of roles with the King's Company, including:

- Falstaff in Shakespeare's Henry IV plays
- Brabantio in Othello
- Corbachio in Jonson's Volpone
- Sir Epicure Mammon in The Alchemist
- Morose in Epicene
- Lygones in Beaumont and Fletcher's A King and No King
- Apollonius in Dryden's Tyrannick Love
- Mario in The Assignation
- the Priest in The Indian Emperour
- Abenamar in The Conquest of Granada
- Hermogenes in Marriage à la mode
- Lord Latimer in Boyle's The Black Prince
- Sir Jasper Fidget in Wycherly's The Country Wife
- Major Oldfox in The Plain Dealer.

Cartwright received a minor mention in the anti-Dryden satire The Rehearsal, in which he supposedly plays "Thunder." When the Theatre Royal, Drury Lane burned down in 1672, Cartwright invested £150 in its replacement.

Cartwright remained with the United Company after 1682, until the end of his acting career. He was active even at an advanced age; with the United Company he played Cacafogo in Fletcher's Rule a Wife and Have a Wife.

== Bequest ==
Cartwright was a collector as well as an actor and bookseller. At his death he willed his collection to Dulwich College. The collection comprised 239 portraits, plus drawings, prints, books, and manuscripts; Cartwright also willed the College money (£400 of "broad old gold") and even personal effects ("two silver tankards, damask linen, an Indian quilt, and a Turkey carpet"). The portrait collection included public figures like Sir Thomas Gresham, Henry Frederick, Prince of Wales, and Mary, Queen of Scots; Richard Burbage and Richard Perkins among other actors; and personal items — pictures of Cartwright, his father, and his first and third wives.

Disputes over Cartwright's last will and testament, between his servants and the College, generated an extensive legal record. Cartwright's will mentions that he was childless; if he and any of his three wives had offspring, they did not survive him.

Given his connection with Dulwich, Cartwright was likely also responsible for donating MS. Egerton 1994, a collection of play manuscripts, to the College.
