= Rebecca Marshall =

English actress

Rebecca Marshall (fl. 1663 – 1677) was a noted English actress of the Restoration era, one of the first generation of women performers on the public stage in Britain. She was the younger sister of Anne Marshall, another prominent actress of the period.

The younger Marshall sister began acting with the King's Company, under the management of Thomas Killigrew, around 1663; she remained with that troupe for her full career, except for a final year with the rival Duke's Company in 1677. She acted with her sister Anne at least once, in John Dryden's The Maiden Queen in 1664; Anne played Candiope, and Rebecca played the Queen. When her older sister retired from the stage (temporarily) in 1668, Rebecca inherited several of her roles, as Aurelia in Dryden's An Evening's Love and Nourmahal in Aureng-zebe; she may also have inherited the part of Evadne in Beaumont and Fletcher's The Maid's Tragedy. Rebecca Marshall's other roles were:

- Calpurnia in Shakespeare's Julius Caesar
- Spaconia in Beaumont and Fletcher's A King and No King
- Quisara in Fletcher's The Island Princess
- Dorothea in Massinger and Dekker's The Virgin Martyr
- Berenice in Dryden's Tyrannick Love
- Lyndaraxa in The Conquest of Granada
- Lucretia in The Assignation
- Ysabinda in Amboyna
- Doralice in Marriage à la mode
- Plantagenet in Boyle's The Black Prince
- Roxana in Lee's The Rival Queens
- Olivia in Wycherly's The Plain Dealer

— among other parts, including spoken prologues and epilogues for various dramas. She participated in two of Killigrew's famous all-female productions, of his own The Parson's Wedding and Beaumont and Fletcher's Philaster, both in 1672.

Rebecca Marshall formed a "remarkable acting combination" with fellow performer Elizabeth Boutell, first in William Joyner's The Roman Empress in 1670. Their success inspired a fashion for plays of "women in conflict," in which Marshall was usually the villainess (or at least the darker half of the pairing), and Boutell the virtuous heroine. They enacted this pattern in The Conquest of Granada, also in 1670: Marshall was Lyndaraxa to Boutell's Bezayda. And again, with Marshall as Poppea and Boutell as Cyara in Nathaniel Lee's The Tragedy of Nero (1674); as Queen Berenice and Clarona in John Crowne's The Destruction of Jerusalem (1677); and as Roxana and Statira in Lee's The Rival Queens (also 1677).

The "women in conflict" play reached beyond Marshall and Boutell: the rival Duke's Company competed with its own actress pairing, Mary Betterton and Mary Lee; and Elizabeth Barry and Anne Bracegirdle repeated the pattern in the 1680s and '90s. In her one season with the Duke's Company, Rebecca Marshall was cast against Barry in a rare comic version of the pattern, in Thomas d'Urfey's A Fond Husband.

Samuel Pepys repeatedly refers to both Marshall sisters in his Diary; he calls the younger "Beck Marshall." Rebecca had a reputation as a beauty, which apparently caused her difficulties: she twice petitioned King Charles II for protection from obstreperous men in her audience. She had a habit of feuding with Nell Gwyn.
