= Michael Mohun =

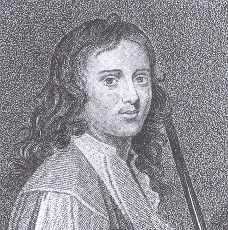

Michael Mohun (1616? – buried 11 October 1684) was a leading English actor both before and after the 1642–60 closing of the theatres.

Mohun began his stage career as a boy player filling female roles; he was part of Christopher Beeston's theatrical establishment at the Cockpit Theatre, "eventually becoming a key member of Queen Henrietta's Men."

For the period from 1642 to 1659, Mohun was an officer in military units loyal to the House of Stuart; he served in England, Ireland, and the Low Countries, and rose to the rank of major. He was seriously wounded at Dublin, and was a prisoner of war for two extended periods.

At the end of the English Interregnum, Mohun was one of the men — George Jolly and John Rhodes were others — who attempted to restart dramatic performance. In 1659 Mohun performed with other pre-Commonwealth actors in an unlicensed troupe at the Red Bull Theatre. As the manager of the troupe, Mohun came to an agreement with the Master of the Revels to pay fees for the privilege of performing; but eventually, like Jolly and Rhodes, he was out-manoeuvred by Thomas Killigrew and Sir William Davenant. After a complex power struggle for the two company patents issued by Charles II at the Restoration of the monarchy, Mohun became a full sharer in Killigrew's King's Company. Along with Charles Hart, the other leading male actor, Mohun was in a position of some authority, often signing official papers on behalf of the sharing actors. He remained a member of the King's Company until he left the stage on account of age and ill-health in the late 1670s.

Mohun regularly acted leading and major roles, mostly villains. His interpretations of Iago and of the title role in Ben Jonson's Volpone were famous, and he brought a sinister edge to the part of Pinchwife in William Wycherley's The Country Wife. Mohun repeatedly seconded Charles Hart's leads, playing Iago to Hart's Othello, and Cassius to Hart's Brutus.

Mohun compiled a long list of noteworthy other roles in his career. He played Bellamente in Shirley's Love's Cruelty both before 1642 and after 1660, and he acted in other revivals besides those named above. He played:

- Face in The Alchemist
- Truewit in Epicene
- Leontius in The Humorous Lieutenant
- Don Leon in Rule a Wife and Have a Wife
- Melantius in The Maid's Tragedy
- Mardonius in A King and No King
- Aubrey in Rollo Duke of Normandy.

He took roles in contemporary Restoration dramas, by John Dryden —

- Maximin in Tyrannick Love
- Ventidius in All for Love
- Rhodophil in Marriage à la mode
- the Old Emperor in Aureng-zebe
- Beaumont in Amboyna
- Philocles in The Maiden Queen
- Belamy in An Evening's Love
- the Emperor in The Indian Emperour
- the Duke of Mantua in The Assignation

— and by other playwrights:

- Pinchwife in Wycherly's The Country Wife
- Clytus in Nathaniel Lee's The Rival Queens
- Augustus Caesar in Lee's Gloriana
- Britannicus in Lee's The Tragedy of Nero
- Hannibal in Lee's Sophonisba, or Hannibal's Overthrow
- Mythridates in Lee's Mythridates, King of Pontus
- Lord Burleigh in John Banks's The Unhappy Favourite
- Matthias in John Crowne's The Destruction of Jerusalem
- Breakbond in Edward Howard's The Man of Newmarket
- King Edward III in The Black Prince by Roger Boyle, 1st Earl of Orrery.

Mohun retired from the stage in 1682, when the King's Company joined with the Duke's Company to form the United Company. He had trouble obtaining his pension; his petition to King Charles II on the subject is valuable for the amount of autobiographical material it contains.

== Sources ==
- Astington, John H. "Actors and the Court After 1642." Early Modern Literary Studies, Special Issue 15 (August 2007).
- Brown, Charles Cedric, ed. Patronage, Politics, and Literary Traditions in England, 1558–1658. Detroit, Wayne State University Press, 1993.
- Highfill, Philip Jr, Burnim, Kalman A., and Langhans, Edward (1973–93). Biographical Dictionary of Actors, Actresses, Musicians, Dancers, Managers and Other Stage Personnel in London, 1660–1800. 16 volumes. Carbondale, Illinois: Southern Illinois University Press.
- Nunzeger, Edwin. A Dictionary of Actors and of Other Persons Associated with the Public Representation of Plays in England Before 1642. New Haven, Yale University Press, 1929.
- Thomson, Peter. The Cambridge Introduction to English Theatre, 1660–1900. Cambridge, Cambridge University Press, 2006.
- Chisholm, Hugh, ed. (1911). "Mohun, Michael" . Encyclopædia Britannica. Vol. 18 (11th ed.). Cambridge University Press.
- "Mohun, Michael" . Dictionary of National Biography. London: Smith, Elder & Co. 1885–1900.
- Astington, John H. "Mohun, Michael (c.1616–1684)". Oxford Dictionary of National Biography (online ed.). Oxford University Press. doi:10.1093/ref:odnb/18885. (Subscription or UK public library membership required.)
