= Epicœne, or The Silent Woman =

Play by Ben Jonson

Epicœne, or The Silent Woman, also known as Epicene, is a comedy by Renaissance playwright Ben Jonson. The play is about a man named Dauphine, who creates a scheme to get his inheritance from his uncle Morose. The plan involves setting Morose up to marry Epicoene, a boy disguised as a woman (though none of the other characters know this until the final scene of the play). It was originally performed by the Blackfriars Children, or Children of the Queen's Revels, a group of boy players, in 1609. Excluding its two prologues, the play is written entirely in prose.

The first performance of Epicœne was, by Jonson's admission, a failure. Years later, however, John Dryden and others championed it, and after the Restoration it was frequently revived—Samuel Pepys refers to a performance on 6 July 1660, and places it among the first plays legally performed after Charles II's restoration.

== Characters ==
- Morose: A gentleman that loves silence
- Sir Dauphine Eugenie: A Knight, Morose's nephew
- Ned Clerimont: A Gentleman, Dauphine's friend
- Truewit: Dauphine's other friend
- Epicoene: A young Gentlewoman, supposedly the silent woman
- Sir John Daw: A Knight, Epicoene's servant
- Sir Amorous la Foole: A Knight
- Thomas Otter: A land and sea Captain
- Cutbeard: A barber, also aids in tricking Morose
- Mute: One of Morose's servants
- Madame Haughty: Ladies Collegiates
- Madame Centaure, Ladies Collegiates
- Mistress Mavis, Ladies Collegiates
- Mistress Trusty, The Lady Haughty's woman
- Mistress Otter, The Captain's wife
- Parson
- Pages
- Servants

== Plot ==
The play takes place in London, primarily in the home of Morose. Morose is a wealthy old man with an obsessive hatred of noise, going as far as to live on a street too narrow for carts to pass and make noise. He has made plans to disinherit his nephew Dauphine by marrying. This is due to the schemes and tricks Dauphine has played on him in the past. To combat this, Dauphine concocts a plan with Cutbeard, Morose's barber. Cutbeard presents Morose with a young (and supposedly) silent woman to marry. When Morose meets Epicœne, he tries to find out if she is really a silent woman, testing her obedience. He tells her not to succumb to the temptations of the court and tells her about the virtues of silence. Under the assumption that his fiancée, Epicœne, is an exceptionally quiet woman, Morose excitedly plans their marriage. Unbeknownst to him, Dauphine has arranged the whole match for purposes of his own.

At the same time there is an alliance of women with intellectual pretensions called the Ladies Collegiates. They are married women who live away from their husbands and speak their minds. They talk about how women can use sex to control their husbands.

Truewit, hoping to secure his friend's inheritance, attempts to persuade Morose that marriage would not be good for him. Truewit says that no matter what, Morose will find himself unhappy in marriage, regardless of whether she is pretty, ugly, rich, poor, or even if Morose loves her. Truewit tells Morose that it is not the women's fault; all of them are corrupted. He also tells Morose to kill himself instead of getting married. The couple are married despite the well-meaning interference of Dauphine's friend Truewit. Morose soon regrets his wedding day, as his house is invaded by a charivari consisting of Dauphine, Truewit, and Clerimont; a sea-captain named Otter and his wife; two stupid knights (La Foole and Daw); and an assortment of Collegiates. The house is overrun with noise and clamor, much to Morose's chagrin. Worst for Morose, Epicœne quickly reveals herself to be a loud, nagging mate.

Mistress Otter has a dominant personality compared to her husband. She has the same characteristics as Katherine from The Taming of the Shrew. She is intimidating and in charge of domestic resources. She shouts at him in front of Truewit and his friends and she tells him that he is sullying her image. It appears that she had great options in life but she ended up settling for him.

Desperate for a divorce, Morose consults two lawyers (who are actually Dauphine's friends Cutbeard and Otter in disguise), but they can find no grounds for ending the match. Finally, Dauphine promises to reveal grounds to end the marriage if Morose agrees to give him his inheritance. The agreement made, Dauphine strips the female costume from Epicœne, revealing that Morose's wife is, in fact, a boy, and therefore their marriage cannot be upheld. Morose is dismissed harshly, and the other ludicrous characters are discomfited by this revelation; Daw and Foole, for instance, had claimed to have slept with Epicœne.

== Sources ==
Jonson utilised a variety of sources to write Epicœne. While most details of characterisation and plot are his own invention, the scenario originates from two orations by Libanius: in one, a groom in Morose's situation argues for permission to commit suicide to escape his marriage, while in the other an elderly miser plans to disinherit a nephew who laughed at him. The coup de théâtre of Epicœne's unveiling, while traditionally viewed as derived from the Casina of Plautus, is closer both in spirit and in execution to Il Marescalco of Aretino. Finally, the comic duel between La Foole and Daw is usually seen as an echo of the mock-duel between Viola and Aguecheek in Shakespeare's Twelfth Night. Some more local details are also borrowed from the classical misogynistic tradition. Truewit's speeches condemning marriage borrow from Ovid's Ars Amatoria and Juvenal's Satire VI. John Aubrey's claim that Morose was modelled on Elizabethan businessman Thomas Sutton is no longer credited.

Victoria Price has suggested the character Lady Centaure in the Epicœne represents the courtier Cecily Bulstrode, her name thinly coded using the letters "Ce" and "taurus" to allude to a bull. For Tristan Marshall, aspects of the character, particularly allusions to horse riding, suggest that Lady Centuare was intended for Anne of Denmark. Ben Jonson dedicated his 1619 edition of Epicœne, or The silent woman to the Scottish courtier and naval officer Francis Stuart, who had defended the play from charges of libel brought by Arbella Stuart in 1610.

== Stage history and reception ==
Unlike many of William Shakespeare's plays, which would have been performed in the open aired Globe Theatre, this play's reliance on controlled sound would have required that it be performed in a small, contained venue like the Whitefriars Theatre. The intended audience of this play would have been wealthier than Shakespeare's crowd. This can be seen through the play's use of Latin phrases, which would have required the audience to possess advanced education in order to understand all of the jokes and references.

The play premiered at the Whitefriars Theatre in either December 1609 or January 1610, and was originally performed by the Children of the Queen's Revels. The cast was led by Nathan Field (who may have played either Truewit or Dauphin). Little heed is now given to the Victorian critic F. G. Fleay's hypothesis that Jonson himself played Morose. Jonson hinted to William Drummond that the play failed; he mentioned certain verses calling the title appropriate, since the audience had remained silent at the end. A report from the Venetian ambassador shows that at least one person spoke up in response to the play: Arbella Stuart, who complained of a personal reference to a recent intrigue involving the prince of Moldavia. Whatever trouble this complaint may have caused was apparently smoothed over by Stuart's subsequent marriage to William Seymour. Despite these issues, there is evidence that the play remained popular, as suggested by a Stationer's Register entry in 1612, which indicates the intention to publish a quarto of the play.

The play influenced at least two minor plays before the interregnum: Peter Hausted's Rival Friends (1631) and Jasper Mayne's The City Match (1639).

After the Restoration, Epicœne was frequently revived and highly appreciated; in the course of a lengthy analysis, Dryden calls it "the pattern of a perfect play." The play was one of the first to be performed in London after the theatres reopened in 1660. Samuel Pepys's diary records several viewings of the play. The first, in early summer of 1660, seems likely to have been among the first plays performed after Charles II's return to London. Pepys saw the play again in January 1661, with Edward Kynaston in the title role.

In 1664, Pepys saw the play at the Theatre Royal with Elizabeth Knepp in the title role; this was probably the first performance in which a woman played Epicœne. Over the next century, a number of celebrated actresses, including Anne Oldfield and Sarah Siddons, performed the part. Siddons, however, was directly associated with the play's departure from the stage. David Garrick and George Colman's updated version (1752), featuring Siddons, was a disastrous failure. Bonnell Tyler, echoing Reformation comments on the play, condemned Morose as ludicrously unnatural, and other reviewers were no kinder. Garrick replaced Siddons with a boy, responding to complaints that a female Epicœne was ludicrous. The revamped casting did not save the production, and Epicœne vanished from the boards for over a century, a victim of the falling popularity of non-Shakespearean Renaissance dramas.

In 1935, Richard Strauss's opera Die schweigsame Frau, with a libretto by Stefan Zweig based on Jonson's play, premiered in Dresden.

== Notable performances ==
=== Epicœne in the United States ===
Major American revivals of Epicœne have been rare. In Washington D.C., the Shakespeare Theatre Company produced the play in 2003, with Daniel Breaker starring as Truewit. The play has been performed only twice in New York in recent years: once in the 1980s at Jean Cocteau Repertory theatre and in 2010 as part of the "Anybody But Shakespeare Classics Festival" by (re:) Directions Theatre Company.

=== Adaptations ===
The play was adapted for radio by the BBC and featured Marius Goring, Laidman Browne, Gabriel Wolf, Norman Shelley, Vivienne Chatterton, June Tobin, and David Spenser.
