= William Wintershall =

English actor

William Wintershall (died July 1679), also Wintersall or Wintersell, was a noted seventeenth-century English actor. His career spanned the difficult years of mid-century, when English theatres were closed from 1642 to 1660, during the English Civil War and the Interregnum.

According to James Wright's Historia Histrionica (1699), Wintershall's career began in the final years of the period of English Renaissance theatre; he was likely a young member of Queen Henrietta's Men at the Salisbury Court Theatre in the 1637–42 years. During the theatre closure, 1642–60, Wintershall was one of the English actors who performed in Europe, mainly in The Hague and Paris, in the middle 1640s. Wintershall became involved in a lawsuit with fellow actor Andrew Cane in 1654. The suit involved a thirty-year-old debt of £40, between Richard Gunnell, builder of the Salisbury Court Theatre, and his actors, including Cane; Wintershall had married Gunnell's daughter Margaret in 1641 or 1642, so becoming involved in the dispute. (The outcome of the suit is not known). In 1659 Wintershall and a Henry Eaton paid a bond for a court appearance by Anthony Turner, who was in legal trouble for violating the prohibition against acting. (If Wintershall had been in Queen Henrietta's Men, Turner was a former colleague.)

Wintershall's stage career experienced a resurgence with the Restoration; he was one of the thirteen actors who were the original "sharers" (partners) in the King's Company under the management of Thomas Killigrew. Wintershall played a wide range of roles with the troupe, including:

- King Henry in Shakespeare's Henry IV plays
- Master Slender in The Merry Wives of Windsor
- Octavius Caesar in Julius Caesar
- Cokes in Jonson's Bartholomew Fair
- Subtle in The Alchemist
- Sir Amorous La Foole in Epicene
- the King in Fletcher's The Humorous Lieutenant
- Gobrias in Beaumont and Fletcher's A King and No King
- the King in The Maid's Tragedy
- Sir Gervase Simple in Shirley's Love in a Maze
- Don Alonzo in Dryden's An Evening's Love
- Arimant in Aureng-zebe
- Polydamas in Marriage à la mode
- Odmar in The Indian Emperour
- Bomilcar in Lee's Sophonisba, or Hannibal's Overthrow
- King John of France in Boyle's The Black Prince.

The notes to Buckingham's play The Rehearsal (1671; printed 1672) describe Wintershall as "a most judicious actor, and the best instructor of others." John Downes, in his Roscius Anglicanus (1708), called Wintershall "good in Tragedy, as well as in Comedy...."
