= Charles Hart (actor) =

17th-century English actor

- Born: 1625; Cripplegate, London, United Kingdom
- Died: 18 August 1683 (aged 57–58)
- Occupation: Actor

Charles Hart (bap. 1625 – 18 August 1683) was a prominent English Restoration actor.

A Charles Hart was christened on 11 December 1625, in the parish of St. Giles Cripplegate, in London. It is not absolutely certain that this was the actor, though the name was not common at the time.. He was most likely the son of William Hart, a minor actor with the King's Men. Hart began his career as a boy player with the King's Men; he was an apprentice of Richard Robinson, longtime member of that company. Hart established his reputation by playing the role of the Duchess in The Cardinal, the tragedy by James Shirley, in 1641. James Wright says in Historia Histrionica that: "Hart and Clun, were bred up Boys at the Blackfriers; and Acted Womens Parts, Hart was [Richard] Robinson's Boy or Apprentice: He Acted the Dutchess in the Tragedy of the Cardinal, which was the first Part that gave him Reputation."

He served as a soldier in the English Civil War, and was an officer in Prince Rupert's regiment of cavalry, along with fellow actors Nicholas Burt and Robert Shatterell. Hart and the others most likely saw combat at the battles of Marston Moor and Naseby, and perhaps at Edgehill as well.

Hart then returned to acting; evidence suggests he was with other displaced English actors in Europe in 1646. In 1648, Hart, Walter Clun and eight other actors, were involved in an attempt to restart the King's Men company during the Puritan Commonwealth, which, perhaps unsurprisingly, did not succeed. On 5 February 1648, at the Cockpit Theatre, Hart and other King's Men were arrested for violating the ban against theatrical performance; they were caught in the midst of a performance of Rollo Duke of Normandy (in which Hart played the character Otto). Hart and the others were imprisoned for a short time, then released.

Just before the Restoration of the monarchy in 1660, acting resumed on a larger scale, and Hart seems to have been then a member of a company performing at the Cockpit playhouse, led by Michael Mohun. As soon as the King's Company was formed in 1660, Hart became one of its leading men; he specialised in playing the male half of witty, bantering couples. This type of dialogue in Restoration comedy was largely influenced by the talents and personalities of Hart and Nell Gwyn, in plays like James Howard's The Mad Couple; Gwyn was his mistress before she became Charles II's. Hart's natural dignity in playing royal roles was also often commented on by contemporaries, and in the heroic play he "was celebrated for superman roles, notably the arrogant, bloodthirsty Almanzor in John Dryden's Conquest of Granada."

When Hart played in Euterpe Restored in 1672, Richard Flecknoe composed the following lines:

Beauty to the eye, and music to the ear,
Such even the nicest critics must allow
Burbage was once and such Charles Hart is now.

Throughout his Restoration career, Hart filled a range of noteworthy parts. He was Cassio in early stagings of Shakespeare's Othello; after 1669 he played the title role. He played roles in revivals of plays by Shakespeare, Ben Jonson, and John Fletcher —

- Hotspur in Henry IV, Part 1
- Brutus in Julius Caesar
- Mosca in Volpone
- Demetrius in The Humorous Lieutenant
- Michael Perez in Rule a Wife and Have a Wife
- Arbaces in A King and No King
- Amintor in The Maid's Tragedy
- Rollo in Rollo Duke of Normandy
- Welford in The Scornful Lady
- Don John in The Chances

— and in contemporary dramas, by John Dryden —

- Marc Antony in All for Love
- Porphyrius in Tyrannick Love
- Aurange Zebe in Aurang-zebe
- Celadon in The Maiden Queen
- Wildblood in An Evening's Love
- Cortez in The Indian Emperour
- Aurelian in The Assignation

— and by other dramatists —

- Horner in Wycherly's The Country Wife
- Manly in Wycherly's The Plain Dealer
- Phraartes in Crowne's The Destruction of Jerusalem
- Massinissa in Lee's Sophonisba, or Hannibal's Overthrow
- Alexander the Great in Lee's The Rival Queens
- Ziphares in Lee's Mithridates, King of Pontus
- Lord Delaware in Boyle's The Black Prince.

In 1682, when the King's Company joined with the Duke's Company to form the United Company, Hart retired due to poor health, with a pension of 40 shillings per week.
