= Edward Kynaston (actor) =

English actor

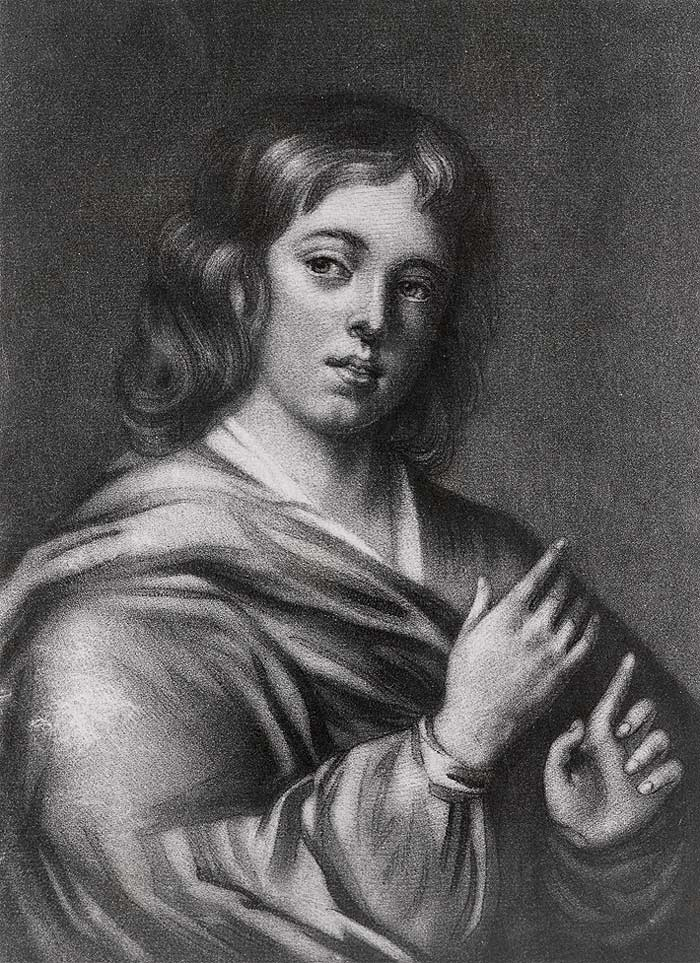
- 1889 mezzotint engraving of Edward Kynaston.
- Born: c. 1640
- Died: January 1712

Edward Kynaston (c. 1640 – January 1706) was an English actor, one of the last Restoration "boy players", young male actors who played women's roles.

== Career ==
Kynaston was good looking and made a convincing woman: Samuel Pepys called him "the loveliest lady that ever I saw in my life" after seeing him in a production of John Fletcher's The Loyal Subject at the Cockpit-in-Court, "only her voice [is] not very good". He also played the title role in Ben Jonson's Epicoene. Pepys had dinner with Kynaston after this production on 18 August 1660.

Simultaneously, Kynaston played male roles as well. He filled the role of Otto in Rollo Duke of Normandy on 6 December 1660, having played the female role of Arthiope in the same play in previous weeks. On 7 January 1661, Kynaston played three roles in a performance of Jonson's Epicoene, one female and two male.

The actor Colley Cibber recalled: "the Ladies of Quality prided themselves in taking him with them in their Coaches to Hyde-Park in his Theatrical Habit, after the Play." Cibber also reported that a performance of a tragedy attended by Charles II was once delayed because, as someone explained, Kynaston, who was playing the Queen, "was not shav'd".

In the 1660s women were permitted to appear on stage and male actors playing female roles in serious drama was strongly discouraged. Kynaston's last female role was as Evadne in Beaumont and Fletcher's The Maid's Tragedy with Thomas Killigrew's King's Company in 1661.

Described by Samuel Pepys as "the prettiest woman in the whole house" and "the handsomest man", the rumour of the time had him playing female roles off stage as well. When already in his thirties, lampoons circulated that made him out to be the lover of George Villiers, 2nd Duke of Buckingham.

Kynaston went on to make a successful career in male roles and was noted for his portrayal of Shakespeare's Henry IV. He retired in 1699.

== Fictional portrayals ==
Kynaston is played by Billy Crudup in the 2004 film Stage Beauty directed by Sir Richard Eyre. He is represented as a foppish bisexual, who slowly reveals more complexity in his personality and sexuality. The film is an adaptation of the play Compleat Female Stage Beauty by Jeffrey Hatcher. In 2012, the Houston Grand Opera announced a new opera by Carlisle Floyd with Kynaston as the protagonist: it premiered in March 2016. He also appeared as a character in Nell Gwynn, played by Greg Haiste in the premiere production in 2015.

== See also ==
- Restoration theatre
