= King's Company =

Enterprise of theatrical productions in London

The King's Company was one of two enterprises granted the rights to mount theatrical productions in London, after the London theatre closure had been lifted at the start of the English Restoration. It existed from 1660 to 1682, when it merged with the Duke's Company to form the United Company.

== History ==
On 21 August 1660, King Charles II granted Thomas Killigrew and Sir William Davenant each official permission in the form of a temporary "privilege" to form acting companies. Killigrew's King's Company fell under the sponsorship of Charles himself; Davenant's Duke's Company under that of Charles's brother, then the Duke of York, later James II of England. The temporary privileges would be followed later by letters patent, issued on 25 April 1662 in Killigrew's case, cementing a hereditary monopoly on theatre for the patent-holders.

The first permanent venue for the King's Company was Gibbon's Tennis Court; in 1663, responding to competition from the Duke's Company's more advanced theatre in Lisle's Tennis Court, Killigrew built and opened the King's Playhouse, today's Theatre Royal, Drury Lane. This burned down in 1672 and was rebuilt and reopened in 1674. Killigrew sold most of his interests in the company by the early 1670s and management was in his son Charles' hands after 1671. In 1682, the King's Company and the Duke's Company merged to become the so-called United Company, under the leadership of the Duke's Company's people.

== Company members ==
Among its senior actors, the early King's Company counted many of the more experienced actors still working at the time: Michael Mohun, Charles Hart, John Lacy, Edward Kynaston, Walter Clun, Thomas Betterton and Elizabeth Weaver were part of the initial group. Betterton would be "seduced" away to the Duke's Company by 5 November the same year, not long before the Lord Chamberlain issued orders forbidding such transfers from one company to the other. Such orders would be encoded into the 1662 letters patent as well.

On 28 January 1661, fifteen members of the new King's Company – Thomas Killigrew, Sir Robert Howard and thirteen actors – signed a lease with the Earl of Bedford for the site of a new theatre, an agreement that also defined the sharers in the company. The thirteen actor/sharers were Hart, Mohun, Lacy, Clun, Kinaston, Richard Baxter, Theophilus Bird, Nicholas Blagden, Nicholas Burt, William Cartwright, Thomas Loveday, Robert Shatterell and William Wintershall.

Killigrew quickly expanded his troupe to include the first actresses on the English public stage, starting in 1661. His company included Margaret Hughes, Anne Marshall, Mary Knep, Elizabeth Boutell, Katherine Corey, Elizabeth Cox, Elizabeth James and Nell Gwyn.

Killigrew's motivations for entering into his theatrical enterprise were more monetary than artistic. During most of the 1660s, he seems not to have been a manager in the day-to-day sense; this task was delegated to the senior actors, including Hart, Lacy and Mohun. Killigrew did not exert – and probably could not have exerted – strong control over the artistic direction of the company.

== See also ==
- George Jolly
- John Rhodes
