= 1690 in literature =

This article contains information about the literary events and publications of 1690.

== Events ==
- December 10 – Playwright Henry Nevil Payne is tortured for his role in the Montgomery Plot to restore James II to the throne — the last time a political prisoner is subjected to torture in Britain.
- Colley Cibber becomes an actor with the Drury Lane company.

== New books ==
=== Prose ===
- Nicholas Barbon – A Discourse of Trade
- Pierre Bayle (attributed) – Avis important aux réfugiés
- Sir Thomas Browne (posthumously) – A Letter to a Friend
- Antoine Furetière (posthumously) – Dictionnaire universel
- John Locke
  - An Essay Concerning Human Understanding (dated this year but published 1689)
  - Two Treatises of Government
- Samuel Pepys – Memoires of the Navy
- Baro Urbigerus – Aphorismi Urbigerani

=== Drama ===
- John Bancroft – King Edward III, with the Fall of Mortimer, Earl of March
- Aphra Behn (posthumously) – The Widow Ranter
- Thomas Betterton – The Prophetess, or The History of Dioclesian (adapted from Fletcher and Massinger's The Prophetess, with music by Henry Purcell)
- Edmé Boursault – Esope à la ville
- Roger Boyle, 1st Earl of Orrery – Mr. Anthony
- John Crowne – The English Friar
- John Dryden
  - Amphitryon, or the Two Sosias
  - Don Sebastian
- William Mountfort – The Successful Strangers
- George Powell
  - Alphonso, King of Naples
  - The Treacherous Brothers
- Elkanah Settle – Distress'd Innocence, or The Princess of Persia
- Thomas Shadwell – The Scourers
- Thomas Southerne – Sir Anthony Love
- "W. C." – The Rape Reveng'd, or the Spanish Revolution (adapted from William Rowley's All's Lost by Lust)

=== Poetry ===
- Thomas D'Urfey:
  - Collin's Walk Through London and Westminster
  - New Poems
- See also 1690 in poetry
- Antonio Hurtado de Mendoza – Obras líricas y cómicas, divinas y humanas

== Births ==
- February 3 – Richard Rawlinson, English antiquary and cleric (died 1755)
- September 12 – Peter Dens, Netherlandish theologian (died 1775)
- 1689/90 – Susanna Highmore, English poet (died 1750)

== Deaths ==
- March 21 – Henry Teonge, English diarist and cleric (born 1621)
- May 5 – Theodore Haak, German-born English translator and natural philosopher (born 1605)
- May 12 – John Rushworth, English author of Historical Collections (born c. 1612)
- October 3 – Robert Barclay, Scottish Quaker writer (born c. 1648)
- October 25 – Cornelius Hazart, Dutch Jesuit controversialist (born 1617)
- Unknown date – Franciscus Plante, Dutch poet (born 1613)
- Probable year of death – Jeremias Felbinger, German writer, teacher and lexicographer (born 1616)
