= 1689 in literature =

This article contains information about the literary events and publications of 1689.

== Events ==
- April 30 – Thomas Shadwell becomes Poet Laureate and Historiographer Royal in England.
- April/May – Jonathan Swift becomes secretary to Sir William Temple.
- May 26 – Matsuo Bashō begins the journey described in Oku no Hosomichi (Narrow Road to the Deep North).

== New books ==
=== Prose ===
- Richard Cox – Hibernia Anglicana
- George Hickes – Institutiones Grammaticae Anglo-Saxonicae et Moeso-Gothicae
- John Locke
  - Two Treatises of Government (anonymous)
  - A Letter Concerning Toleration (as by 'P.A.P.O.I.L.A.', in Latin)
  - An Essay Concerning Human Understanding (dated 1690)
- John Selden (died 1654) – Table Talk
- Johann Weikhard von Valvasor – The Glory of the Duchy of Carniola (Die Ehre deß Hertzogthums Crain)

=== Drama ===
- Aphra Behn – The Widow Ranter
- James Carlile – The Fortune Hunters
- Sor Juana – Amor es más labertino (Love the Greater Labyrinth)
- Nathaniel Lee – The Massacre of Paris
- William Mountfort – The Successful Strangers
- Thomas Shadwell – Bury Fair
- Nahum Tate – Dido and Aeneas
- Matthew Taubman – London's Great Jubilee

== Births ==
- January 18 – Charles de Secondat, Baron de Montesquieu, French satirist (died 1755)
- January 21 – Daniel Henchman, Colonial American bookseller and publisher (died 1761)
- May 26 – Lady Mary Wortley Montagu, English poet and letter-writer (died 1762)
- July 9 – Alexis Piron, French epigrammatist (died 1773)
- August 19 (bapt.) – Samuel Richardson, English novelist (died 1761)

== Deaths ==
- January – William Chamberlayne, English poet and playwright (born c. 1619)
- February 21 – Isaac Vossius, Dutch-born collector of manuscripts (born 1618)
- April 16 – Aphra Behn, English dramatist, poet and novelist (born 1640)
- August 21 – William Cleland, Scottish soldier and poet (killed in battle, born c. 1661)
- November 13 – Philipp von Zesen, German poet and hymn-writer (born 1619)
- December 13 – Zbigniew Morsztyn, Polish poet (born c. 1628)
- Unknown date – Pjetër Bogdani, Albanian-language author (born c. 1630)
