= Elinor Leigh =

British actress

Elinor Leigh was a British stage actor of the seventeenth century.

Born Elinor Dixon, she was billed as Mrs Leigh or Mrs Lee after she married the actor Anthony Leigh in 1671. This has led to some difficulty distinguishing on playbills between her and the actress Mary Slingsby who also acted under her married name of Lee at the time. In addition another actress with the name Elizabeth Leigh was also active during the period.

She was a member of the Duke's Company in the 1670s which was then merged into the United Company from 1682, acting mainly at Drury Lane. Her husband died in 1692, and in 1695 she joined those who left to form a new company under Thomas Betterton at the Lincoln's Inn Fields Theatre

== Selected roles ==
- Melvissa in The Women's Conquest by Edward Howard (1670)
- Petilla in The Six Days' Adventure by Edward Howard (1671)
- Orinda in Cambyses, King Of Persia by Elkanah Settle (1671)
- Betty in The Town Shifts by Edward Revet (1671)
- Julia in Charles VIII of France by John Crowne (1671)
- Betty Trickmore in The Citizen Turned Gentleman by Edward Ravenscroft (1672)
- Beatrice in The Careless Lovers by Edward Ravenscroft (1673)
- Isabella in The Country Wit by John Crowne (1676)
- Scintilla in The French Conjuror by Thomas Porter (1677)
- Paulina in The Loving Enemies by Lewis Maidwell (1680)
- Mrs Dashit in The Revenge by Aphra Behn (1680)
- Tournon in The Princess of Cleve by Nathaniel Lee (1680)
- Engine in The London Cuckolds by Edward Ravenscroft (1681)
- Mrs Closet in The City Heiress by Aphra Behn (1682)
- Mrs Prudence in Dame Dobson by Edward Ravenscroft (1683)
- Clara in The Disappointment Thomas Southerne (1684)
- Johayma in Don Sebastian by John Dryden (1689)
- Lady Sly in The Fortune Hunters by John Carlile (1689)
- Lady Pinchgut in The English Friar by John Crowne (1690)
- Oyley in Love for Money by Thomas D'Urfey (1691)
- Mrs Hackwell in The Volunteers by Thomas Shadwell (1692)
- Siam in The Maid's Last Prayer by Thomas Southerne (1693)
- Lucy in The Old Bachelor by William Congreve (1693)
- Lady Meanwell in The Female Virtuosos by Thomas Wright (1693)
- Lady Plyant in The Double Dealer by William Congreve (1693)
- Marmalette in The Richmond Heiress by Thomas D'Urfey (1693)
- Mrs Sneaksby in A Very Good Wife by George Powell (1693)
- Nurse in The Fatal Marriage by Thomas Southerne (1694)
- Rosalin in The Ambitious Slave by Elkanah Settle (1694)
- Vesuvia in The Lover's Luck by Thomas Dilke (1695)
- Plackett in The She-Gallants by George Granville (1695)
- Betty in The Country Wake by Thomas Doggett (1696)
- Doctor's wife in The Anatomist by Edward Ravenscroft (1696)
- Secreta in The City Lady by Thomas Dilke (1696)
- Lady Beauclair in The Innocent Mistress by Mary Pix (1697)
- Lady Temptyouth in The Deceiver Deceived by Mary Pix (1697)
- Grossiere in The Intrigues at Versailles by Thomas d'Urfey (1697)
- Sweetny in The Pretenders by Thomas Dilke (1698)
- Phenissa in Rinaldo and Armida by John Dennis (1698)
- Lady Laycock in The Amorous Widow by Thomas Betterton (1699)
- Lady Wishfort in The Way of the World by William Congreve (1700)
- Sophia in The Czar of Muscovy by Mary Pix (1701)
- Lady Rakelove in The Gentleman Cully by Charles Johnson (1701)
- Lady Autumn in The Ladies Visiting Day by William Burnaby (1701)
- Mrs Plotwell in The Beau's Duel by Susanna Centlivre (1702)
- Widow Bellmont in The Different Widows by Mary Pix (1703)
- Dromia in Love Betrayed by William Burnaby (1703)
- Chloris in As You Find It by Charles Boyle (1703)
- Lady Stale in The Biter by Nicholas Rowe (1704)
- Peeper in The Platonick Lady by Susanna Centlivre (1706)

== Bibliography ==
- Bush-Bailey, Gilli. Treading the Bawds: Actresses and Playwrights on the Late-Stuart Stage. Manchester University Press, 2006.
- Straub, Kristina, G. Anderson, Misty and O'Quinn, Daniel . The Routledge Anthology of Restoration and Eighteenth-Century Drama. Taylor & Francis, 2017.
