= Susanna Verbruggen =

English actress working in London

- Born: Susanna Percival c. 1667
- Died: 1703
- Occupation: Actress
- Spouse(s): William Mountfort; John Verbruggen

Susanna Verbruggen (née Percival) (c. 1667–1703), aka Susanna Mountfort, was an English actress working in London.

== Life ==
She was the daughter of Thomas Percival, a member of the Duke's Company for more than a decade. Her first recorded stage appearance may have been as early as 1681 in D'Urfey's Sir Barnaby Whigg. In 1686 she married the actor William Mountfort, and after Mountfort's infamous murder in 1692, she married the actor John Verbruggen.

She was a successful and popular comedian, known especially for her breeches roles. Her greatest success was as the main character Lucia in Thomas Southerne's Sir Anthony Love, where Lucia partakes of the freedom of the roistering Restoration rake by disguising herself as "Sir Anthony". Both men and women in the audience loved her performance in these types of roles.

She was one of the leading actresses at the United Company, but when the company split in two in 1695 (see Restoration comedy) she was, however, not offered a share in the actors' cooperative, but merely a salary. This may have been the biggest tactical mistake the actors' company made: both the Verbruggens were dissatisfied with the offer, reasonably so since Susanna was extremely versatile and popular with audiences, and returned to the parent company, thereby substantially improving its odds in the competition between the companies (see The Relapse).

Her daughter (also named Susanna Mountfort, 1690-1720) was an actress at Drury Lane, beginning her career in 1703.

== Selected roles ==
- Winifred in Sir Barnaby Whigg by Thomas D'Urfey (1681)
- Prudentia in A Duke and No Duke by Nahum Tate (1684)
- Juliana in The Disappointment by Thomas Southerne (1684)
- Girtred in Cuckold's Haven by Nahum Tate (1685)
- Nell in The Devil of a Wife by Thomas Jevon (1686)
- Isabella in The Squire of Alsatia by Thomas Shadwell (1688)
- Morayma in Don Sebastian by John Dryden (1689)
- Mrs Gertrude in Bury Fair by Thomas Shadwell (1689)
- Maria in The Fortune Hunters by John Carlile (1689)
- Feliciana in The Successful Strangers by William Mountfort (1690)
- Sir Antony Love in Sir Anthony Love by Thomas Southerne (1690)
- Phaedra in Amphitryon by John Dryden (1690)
- Florella in Greenwich Park by William Mountfort (1691)
- Mrs Wittwoud The Wives Excuse by Thomas Southerne (1691)
- Eugenia in The Volunteers by Thomas Shadwell (1692)
- Belinda in The Old Bachelor by William Congreve (1693)
- Catchat in The Female Virtuosos by Thomas Wright (1693)
- Lady Susan Malepert in The Maid's Last Prayer by Thomas Southerne (1693)
- Annabella in A Very Good Wife by George Powell (1693)
- Hillaria in The Canterbury Guests by Edward Ravenscroft (1694)
- Dalinda in Love Triumphant by John Dryden (1694)
- Lionell in The Married Beau by John Crowne (1694)
- Ansilva in The Rival Sisters by Robert Gould (1695)
- Olivia in The Younger Brother by Aphra Behn (1696)
- Berrinthia in The Relapse by John Vanbrugh (1696)
- Olivia in The Lost Lover by Delarivier Manley (1696)
- Madam La Marquise in The Campaigners by Thomas D'Urfey (1698)
- Lady Lurewell in The Constant Couple by George Farquhar (1699)
- Louisa in Love Makes a Man by Colley Cibber (1700)
- Gillian in The Bath by Thomas D'Urfey (1701)
- Lady Lurewell in Sir Harry Wildair by George Farquhar (1701)
- Lady Cringe in The Modish Husband by William Burnaby (1702)
- Hypolita in She Would and She Would Not by Colley Cibber (1702)
- Hillaria in Tunbridge Walks by Thomas Baker (1703)
- Mrs Cringe in The Fair Example by Richard Estcourt (1703)
