= Charlotte Butler =

English actress

Charlotte Butler was an English stage actress and singer of the seventeenth century. She may have joined the Duke's Company in the 1670s, but her first definite recorded performance was in Aphra Behn's The Revenge (1680) The anonymous A Satyr on The Players (c. 1682) describes her,

And Butler's wiles are now so common grown
That by each feather's Cully they are known
So that at least to save her tottering Frame
At Musick Clubs she strives to get a name
But money is the Siren's cheifest aim.
At treats her Squeamish stomach cannot bear
What Amorous Sparks provide with cost and Care
But if she's hungry faith I must be blunt
She'll for a dish of Cutlets shew her Cunt.

== Selected roles ==
- Marinda in The Revenge by Aphra Behn (1680)
- Charlotte in The City-Heiress by Aphra Behn (1682)
- Philidel in King Arthur by John Dryden (1682)
- Mrs Cleremont in Dame Dobson by Edward Ravenscroft (1683)
- Sophia in The Fortune Hunters by James Carlile (1689)
- Charles in Bury Fair by Thomas Shadwell (1689)
- Night in Amphitryon by John Dryden (1690)
- Floriante in Sir Anthony Love by Thomas Southerne (1690)
- Statilia in The Treacherous Brothers by George Powell (1690)
- Astella in The Mistakes by Joseph Harris (1690)
- Airy in The English Frier by John Crowne (1690)
- Betty Jiltall in Love for Money by Thomas d'Urfey (1691)
- La Pupsey in The Marriage-Hater Matched by Thomas d'Urfey (1692)

== Bibliography ==
- Highfill, Philip H., Burnim, Kalman A. & Langhans, Edward A. A Biographical Dictionary of Actors, Actresses, Musicians, Dancers, Managers and Other Stage Personnel in London, 1660–1800: Cabanel to Cory. Southern Illinois University Press, 1975. ISBN 9780809306923
- Van Lennep, W. The London Stage, 1660–1800: Volume One, 1660–1700. Southern Illinois University Press, 1960.
