= The Disappointment (play) =

1684 play

- Original language: English
- Written by: Thomas Southerne
- Genre: Restoration Comedy

Premiere
- Date: April 1684
- Place: Theatre Royal, Drury Lane, London

The Disappointment; Or, The Mother In Fashion is a 1684 comedy play by the Irish writer Thomas Southerne. It was first performed by the United Company at the Theatre Royal, Drury Lane. The prologue was written by John Dryden.

The original cast included Thomas Betterton as Alphonso, William Smith as Lorenzo, John Wiltshire as Alberto, Anthony Leigh as Rogero, Sarah Cooke as Erminia, Susanna Percival as Juliana, Frances Maria Knight as Angelline, Katherine Corey as Her Supposed Mother and Elinor Leigh as Clara.

== Bibliography ==
- Canfield, J. Douglas. Tricksters and Estates: On the Ideology of Restoration Comedy. University Press of Kentucky, 2014.
- Van Lennep, W. The London Stage, 1660-1800: Volume One, 1660-1700. Southern Illinois University Press, 1960.
