= The Czar of Muscovy =

Play attributed to Mary Pix

- Original language: English
- Written by: Mary Pix
- Genre: Tragedy

Premiere
- Date: April 1701
- Place: Lincoln's Inn Fields Theatre, London

The Czar of Muscovy is a play attributed to author Mary Pix, first performed and published in 1701. The play is based on the reign of False Dmitriy I (reigned 1605-1606), and also depicts his consort Marina Mniszech.

It premiered at the Lincoln's Inn Fields Theatre, one of London's two patent theatres. The original cast included John Hodgson as Demetrius, Barton Booth as Zueski, George Pack as Rureck, John Freeman as Manzeck, John Bowman as Alexander, Joseph Harris as Fedor, Elinor Leigh as Sophia, Elizabeth Bowman as Marina and Elizabeth Barry as Zarriana.

== Synopsis ==
A usurper falsely claims to be Demetrius, the son of the last rightful king. He assumes the throne and takes Marina as a wife for a reward after convincing her that her betrothed married another. He then scorns her when he sees Zarrianna, who is engaged and eventually married to Zueski. When it becomes clear that Demetrius will rape Zarrianna, several powerful men rise up to overthrow him. His castle is stormed, the rape is prevented, and Demetrius is killed. The couples are all happily reunited in the end.

== Characters ==
As listed in the original script:

- Demetrius, Czar of Muscovy, an Impostor.
- Zueski, Lord High Steward of Muscovy.
- Bassilius, principal Lord of Mosco.
- Zaporjus, principal Lord of Mosco.
- Rureck, principal Lord of Mosco.
- Bosman, General of the Czar's Forces.
- Carclos, General of the Cossacks.
- The Patriarch of Mosco.
- Fedor, A Priest.
- Manzeck, Vaivode of Sendomiria.
- Alexander, Son to the D. of Wisnewestki.
- Sophia, the old Empress, Widow to Basilovitz.
- Marina, Daughter to Manzeck, Married to Demetrius.
- Zarrianna, Daughter to Boris.
- Terresia, Woman to Marina. Mrs. Martin.

== Scene breakdown and summary ==
=== Act 1 ===
==== Scene 1 ====
Demetrius has just taken over the throne (as an impostor who is impersonating the dead son of the last king) and he has married Marina. The play begins in celebration of the marriage and Demetrius tells his subjects that he forgives everyone who supported the previous king and he will grant every request on this day. Zueski approaches Demetrius and forces himself to be kind to Demetrius even though he views him as a usurper. Zueski asks that his lover, Zarrianna, be released to him. She was held as prisoner by Demetrius after her family resisted Demetrius' rulership. Demetrius grants Zueski's request, and asks that Zarrianna be brought to court before him.

Sophia enters and feigns happiness to see Demetrius. She knows that he is not her son, yet she goes along with his ruse as a self-protecting measure.

Zueski arrives with Zarrianna. Demetrius is openly attracted to Zarrianna, and he commands her to attend Marina in the palace until the time of the wedding. Zueski is horrified at the notion of Zarrianna staying near Demetrius, but she assures him that she will be loyal to him and she will not succumb to sexual assault.

Zueski reveals to Bosman Demetrius' true identity as an impostor. Zueski in fact saw the real Demetrius die of wounds and witnessed the burial, but he did not want to be the sole voice to discover the current usurper's identity in what seemed to be a time of national unity.

The details of the usurpation are revealed. After King Basivolitz's son Theodore died, the uncle Boris killed the other son, Demetrius, and took the throne. He imprisoned Sophia in a monastery, where she was kept until this day. The king of Poland and the Vaivode (Manzeck) helped to orchestrate the arrival of the impostor Demetrius; Boris was killed by the invading army; the gates of Moscow were opened to the impostor; the wife and sons of Boris were killed; Zueski took Zarrianna away to a monastery for safety.

Zueski points out that he is now the nearest kin to the late Basivolitz and he will speak out against Demetrius with Sophia's help.

==== Scene 2 ====
Basilius, Zaporjus, and Rureck suspect that Demetrius is an impostor and a tyrant, and they plan to gain the support of Sophia and the public before taking action. Manzeck complains that Demetrius is slighting his daughter, Marina, and he worries that Demetrius may divorce her.

=== Act 2 ===
==== Scene 1 ====
Alexander returns in disguise to the palace and finds his bride, Marina, married to Demetrius. It is revealed that Manzeck is behind Marina's marriage to Demetrius, as he tried to convince Marina to forget Alexander and he even forged a letter claiming that Alexander had married a German woman. Demetrius is convinced of Marina's innocence, and it is pointed out that the consummation of Marina and Demetrius's vows will not occur until the next day.

==== Scene 2 ====
Demetrius' tyranny increases and he plans to divorce Marina, and threatens to cut off her head if she doesn't quietly obey and leave. He also plans to convince Zarrianna to marry him. She has resisted him thus far, and if this continues, he plans to use force.

==== Scene 3 ====
Demetrius walks in to find Zueski and Zarrianna together, and he is outraged, calling for Zueski's execution. Zarrianna tries to plead for Zueski's life and she begs to be killed with him, all to no avail. Zarrianna finally prevails with Demetrius, warning him that she could never love one who was so cruel to Zueski, and Demetrius calls back the guard to stay the execution order—only to hear that it has already been carried out. Zarrianna is horrified and outraged, and she reveals that she and Zueski were already married. Zarrianna rails against Demetrius, telling him that she will never love him and that the only way she will forgive him is if he kills himself in front of her. Demetrius offers her the throne and warns her that he will rape her if she resists.

=== Act 3 ===
==== Scene 1 ====
Marina refuses to be quietly divorced from Demetrius: she would rather die than give up her dignity. Alexander appears as a pilgrim in disguise and Manzeck's deception is revealed to her. He asks that she come away with him to his father's court, and Marina seeks advice from her father.

Demetrius is angry that Marina will not resign her title (and agree to divorce), threatening her with death. She threatens the rage of her father, and she is imprisoned. Demetrius orders that the Cossacks troops be made ready for battle.

==== Scene 2 ====
Manzeck encounters Alexander and deeply regrets his actions, finally realizing that Demetrius is a usurper. Alexander and Manzeck encounter Zueski, whom they are happy to find still alive. Zueski tells them that Bosman (commander of the castle) is ready to hand the castle over to them. The men plan to overthrow Demetrius and to show the people that the usurper lacks the figure of a cross on his arm (something that the true Demetrius had).

=== Act 4 ===
==== Scene 1 ====
Zarrianna and Marina are in captivity together, and Zarrianna dreads the possibility of rape while Marina dreads death. Zueski and Alexander arrive in disguise, explaining Zueski's escape. Marina reminds Alexander that she is legitimately married to Demetrius and that she will not tolerate Alexander killing him—even though she doesn't love Demetrius.

Demetrius approaches, and—on Zueski's advice—Zarrianna feigns some affection for Demetrius in order to save Marina. Demetrius becomes hopeful, and Zarrianna asks that he not kill Marina until she has more time to decide whether she will give up her title. Demetrius agrees and departs.

==== Scene 2 ====
Bosman warns Sophia that Demetrius plans to kill her, asking that she identify Demetrius as an impostor to the people. The time is now ripe for her to point out his falseness, now that the people are ready to revolt against his cruelty. Sophia agrees, regretting that she didn't expose him earlier.

Demetrius commands Bosman to kill Sophia and Marina—and to make it look like Mariana killed herself so as not to obstruct Zarrianna's relations with the king. Bosman ostensibly agrees, and Demetrius plans to kill Bosman after he carries out these executions.

=== Act 5 ===
==== Scene 1 ====
The revolt begins. Bosman's troops have taken control of the palace, but Demetrius has escaped to the city with a small army. News reaches Demetrius that doom is impending and he plans to rape Zarrianna, promising to hand Mariana over to Carclos. Carclos goes to Marina and Zarrianna in disguise, and they agree to follow to see Zueski, Alexander, and Manzeck. The women arrive to find they were tricked and led to Demetrius. Demetrius and Carclos plan to rape the women before their enemies can storm this area of the palace. The women are horrified, wishing for death, and they are dragged off.

Zueski, Alexander, and Manzeck arrive just as the women call for help from Providence, and they kill Demetrius and Carclos. The lovers are reunited (Alexander and Marina; Zueski and Zarrianna), and Manzeck blesses his daughter's new union.

The people assert that they will follow Zueski as their new rightful ruler as long as Sophia agrees that Demetrius was an impostor; she does so. Everyone salutes Zueski. Marina requests that Demetrius be decently buried, which Zueski grants.

== Bibliography ==
- Burling, William J. A Checklist of New Plays and Entertainments on the London Stage, 1700-1737. Fairleigh Dickinson Univ Press, 1992.
