= John Bowman (actor) =

British stage actor (1651–1739)

John Bowman (1651–1739) was a British stage actor. He began his career in the Duke's Company at the Dorset Garden Theatre. In 1692, he married Elizabeth Watson, who acted under the name Elizabeth Bowman. He later switched to act at the Drury Lane Theatre. He is also referred to as John Boman.

== Selected roles ==
- Peter Santloe in The Counterfeit Bridegroom by Aphra Behn (1677)
- Saunter in Friendship in Fashion by Thomas Otway (1678)
- Patroclus in The Destruction of Troy by John Banks (1678)
- Pisander in The Loyal General by Nahum Tate (1679)
- Crotchett The Virtuous Wife by Thomas D'Urfey (1679)
- Patroclus in Troilus and Cressida by John Dryden (1679)
- Mr Shatter in The Revenge by Aphra Behn (1680)
- Duke of Clarence in The Misery of Civil War by John Crowne (1680)
- Atticus in Theodosius by Nathaniel Lee (1680)
- Dreswell in The City Heiress by Aphra Behn (1682)
- Broom in The Royalist by Thomas D'Urfey (1682)
- Rabsheka Sly in Mr. Turbulent by Anonymous (1682)
- Sylvester in Constantine the Great by Nathaniel Lee (1683)
- Nicusa in A Commonwealth of Women by Thomas D'Urfey (1685)
- Rowland in The Devil of a Wife by Thomas Jevon (1686)
- Trueman in The Squire of Alsatia by Thomas Shadwell (1688)
- Bewford in A Fool's Preferment by Thomas D'Urfey (1688)
- Don Alvarez in Don Sebastian by John Dryden (1689)
- Genius in The Massacre of Paris by Nathaniel Lee (1689)
- Littlegad in The Fortune Hunters by John Carlile (1689)
- Trim in Bury Fair by Thomas Shadwell (1689)
- Cavarnio in The Widow Ranter by Aphra Behn (1689)
- Phoebus in Amphitryon by John Dryden (1690)
- Earl of Leicester in Edward III by William Mountfort (1690)
- Isdigerdes in Distressed Innocence by Elkanah Settle (1690)
- Father Finical in The English Friar by John Crowne (1690)
- Alphonso in Alphonso, King of Naples by George Powell (1690)
- Beau in Greenwich Park by William Mountfort (1691)
- Grimbald in King Arthur by John Dryden (1691)
- Dancing Master in Love for Money by Thomas D'Urfey (1691)
- Courtall in The Wives Excuse by Thomas Southerne (1691)
- Sir Nicholas Dainty in The Volunteers by Thomas Shadwell (1692)
- Brainless in The Marriage-Hater Matched by Thomas D'Urfey (1692)
- Rice ap Shinken in The Richmond Heiress by Thomas D'Urfey (1693)
- Sir Timothy Witless in The Female Virtuosos by Thomas Wright (1693)
- Gayman in The Maid's Last Prayer by Thomas Southerne (1693)
- King of Persia in The Ambitious Slave by Elkanah Settle (1694)
- Craesus in Cyrus the Great by John Banks (1695)
- Tattle in Love for Love by William Congreve (1695)
- Bonvile in The City Bride by Joseph Harris (1696)
- Bellardin in The City Lady by Thomas Dilke (1696)
- Haynes in The Italian Husband by Edward Ravenscroft (1697)
- Spendall in The Innocent Mistress by Mary Pix (1697)
- Vainthroat in The Pretenders by Thomas Dilke (1698)
- Viceroy of Sardinia in The False Friend by Mary Pix (1699)
- Magius The Fate of Capua by Thomas Southerne (1700)
- Magas in The Ambitious Stepmother by Nicholas Rowe (1700)
- Artenor in Antiochus the Great by Jane Wiseman (1701)
- Saunter in The Ladies Visiting Day by William Burnaby (1701)
- Mode in The Beau's Duel by Susanna Centlivre (1702)
- Sir Jeffrey Constant in The Man's Bewitched by Susanna Centlivre (1709)
- Decius in Cato, a Tragedy by Joseph Addison (1713)
- Mendwell in The Apparition by Anonymous (1713)
- Friendly in The Female Advocates by William Taverner (1713)
- Sir Richard Ratcliff in Jane Shore by Nicholas Rowe (1714)
- Duke of Milan The Cruel Gift by Susanna Centlivre (1716)
- Prince of Cambria in Lucius by Delarivier Manley (1717)
- Sir Tremendous in Three Hours After Marriage by John Gay (1717)
- Ebranc in The Briton by Ambrose Philips (1722)
- Ghost in Timoleon by Benjamin Martyn (1730)

== Bibliography ==
- Highfill, Philip H, Burnim, Kalman A. & Langhans, Edward A. A Biographical Dictionary of Actors, Actresses, Musicians, Dancers, Managers, and Other Stage Personnel in London, 1660-1800: Garrick to Gyngell. SIU Press, 1978.
- Straub, Kristina, G. Anderson, Misty and O'Quinn, Daniel . The Routledge Anthology of Restoration and Eighteenth-Century Drama. Taylor & Francis, 2017.
