= King Arthur (opera) =

1691 semi-opera by Dryden and Purcell

- Semi-opera by Henry Purcell
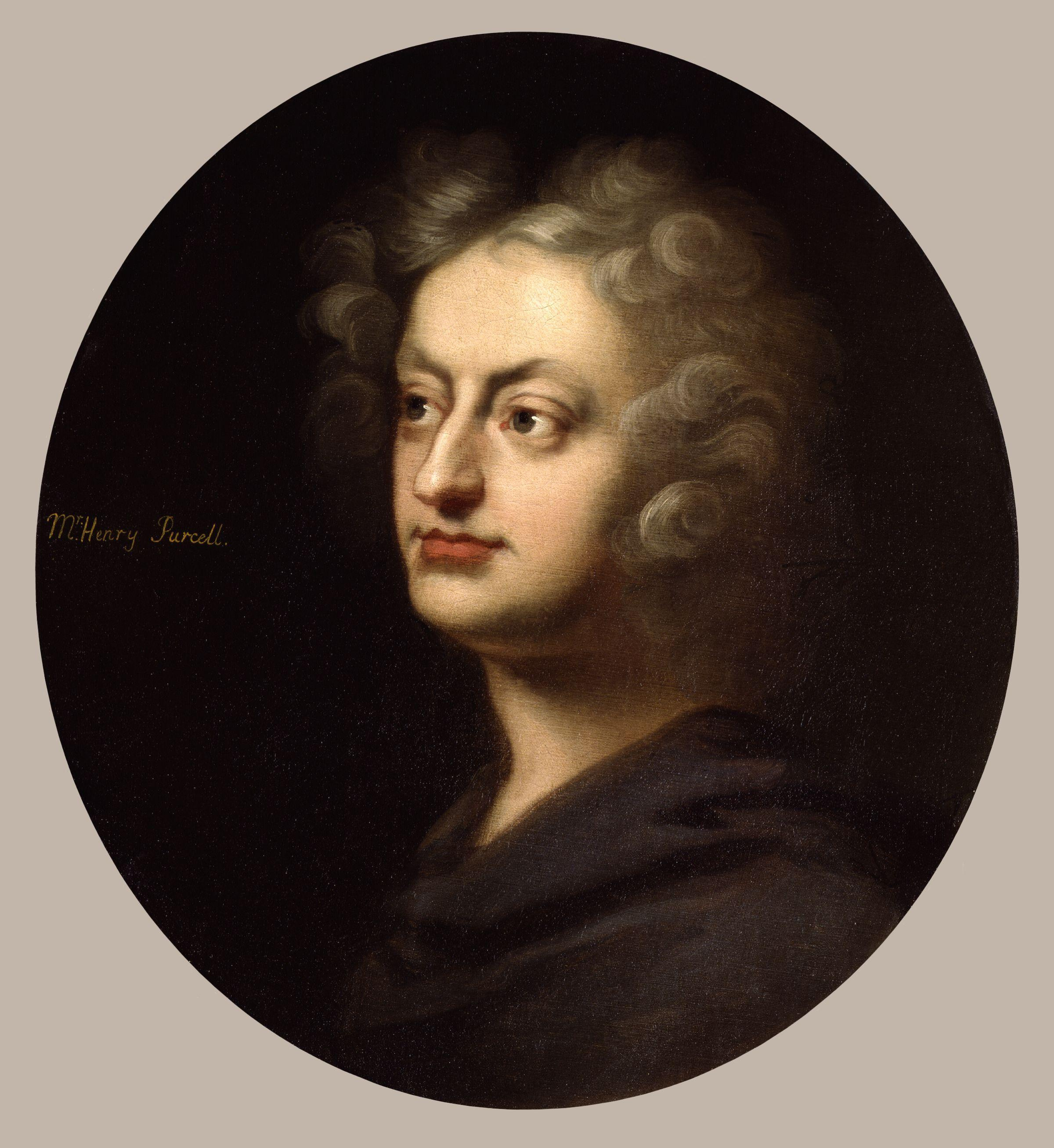
- Henry Purcell c. 1695
- Librettist: John Dryden
- Language: English
- Based on: battles of King Arthur
- Premiere: 1691; Queen's Theatre, Dorset Garden, London

King Arthur, or The British Worthy (Z. 628), is a semi-opera in five acts with music by Henry Purcell and a libretto by John Dryden. It was first performed at the Queen's Theatre, Dorset Garden, London, in late May or early June 1691.

The plot is based on the battles between King Arthur's Britons and the Saxons, rather than the legends of Camelot (although Merlin does make an appearance). It is a Restoration spectacular, including such supernatural characters as Cupid and Venus plus references to the Germanic gods of the Saxons, Woden, Thor, and Freya. The tale centres on Arthur's endeavours to recover his fiancée, the blind Cornish Princess Emmeline, who has been abducted by his arch-enemy, the Saxon King Oswald of Kent.

King Arthur is a "dramatick opera" or semi-opera: the principal characters do not sing, except if they are supernatural, pastoral or, in the case of Comus and the popular Your hay it is mow'd, drunk. Secondary characters sing to them, usually as diegetic entertainment, but in Act 4 and parts of Act 2, as supernatural beckonings. The singing in Act 1 is religious observance by the Saxons, ending with their heroic afterlife in Valhalla. The protagonists' parts are taken by actors, as a great deal of King Arthur consists of spoken text. This was normal practice in 17th century English opera. King Arthur contains some of Purcell's most lyrical music, using adventurous harmonies for the time.

== Composition ==
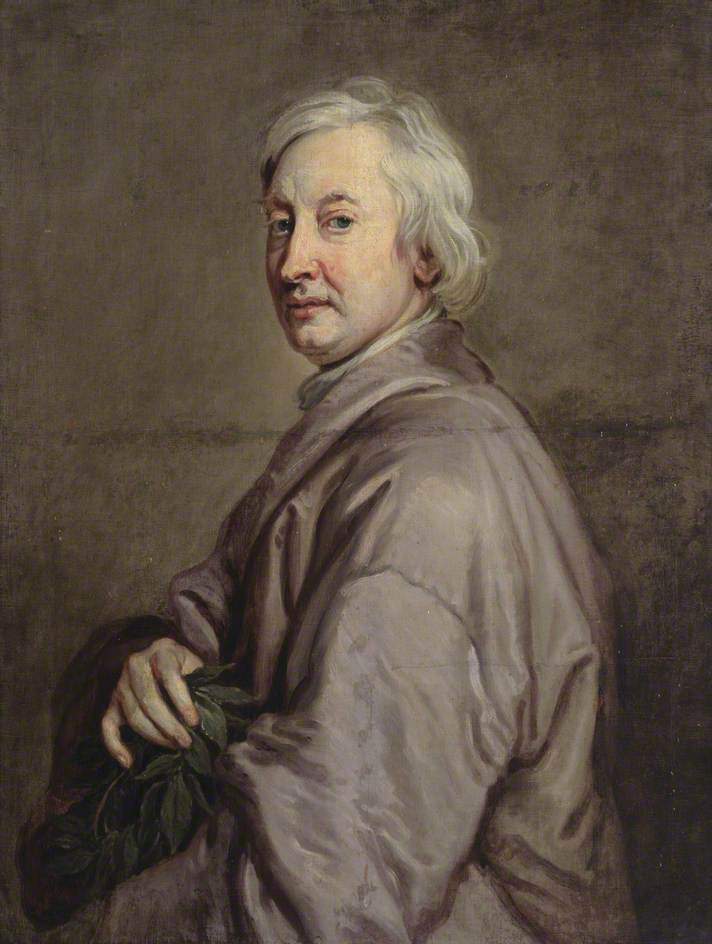
Portrait of John Dryden by Godfrey Kneller, 1698

Dryden probably wrote the original libretto for King Arthur in 1684 to mark the 25th anniversary of King Charles II's Restoration the following year. The original text of King Arthur no longer exists but it was to be in three acts with an allegorical prologue. For unknown reasons Dryden abandoned his intention to have the whole work set to music and developed the prologue into another opera, Albion and Albanius, a collaboration with the Catalan composer Louis Grabu. However, Charles II died in February 1685 and Albion and Albanius was first inauspiciously performed in June 1685 during the Monmouth Rebellion. It was a failure and Dryden shelved any plans he had for the rest of the King Arthur libretto.

In the meantime, England entered a turbulent period in its history. After the Catholic James II took the throne, Dryden too converted to Catholicism. When the Protestant William III overthrew James in the Glorious Revolution in 1688, Dryden refused to renounce his faith and so lost his job as poet laureate to his rival Thomas Shadwell. Purcell's career had also suffered after the death of the music-loving Charles II. With their sources of royal patronage gone, both playwright and composer were looking to make money as freelance professionals and the London stage offered attractive opportunities.

In 1690, the theatre manager Thomas Betterton decided to risk putting on another operatic work, the first since the ill-fated Albion and Albanius. This was the semi-opera Dioclesian (1690), an adaptation of a play by Beaumont and Fletcher. Purcell's music for the production and the lavish staging made it a triumph and Betterton was eager for another such success. He persuaded Dryden to dust off and revise the libretto for King Arthur so Purcell could set it. The two had already collaborated on stage works (Dryden had written the prologue for Dioclesian and Purcell the incidental music for Dryden's comedy Amphitryon) and Dryden was effusive in his praise of Purcell's musical abilities.

In his preface to the printed edition, Dryden explained he had had to adapt the libretto to the changed political circumstances of 1691: "But not to offend the present Times, nor a Government which has hitherto protected me, I have been oblig'd so much to alter the first Design, and take away so many Beauties from the Writing, that it is now no more what it was formerly..." He also made alterations to suit Purcell's musical needs: "the Numbers of Poetry and Vocal Musick, are sometimes so contrary, that in many places I have been oblig'd to cramp my Verses, and make them rugged to the Reader, that they may be harmonious to the Hearer: Of which I have no Reason to repent me, because these sorts of Entertainments are principally design'd for the Ear and the Eye; and therefore in Reason my Art on this occasion, ought to be subservient to his."

== Performance history ==
The exact date of the premiere is unknown but the wordbook was advertised in The London Gazette from 4 to 8 June 1691, suggesting a recent staging. Peter Holman believes it was performed in May. The production was not as spectacular as Dioclesian or the later The Fairy Queen but it proved the most financially successful for the theatre. Betterton himself took the role of King Arthur, despite being in his fifties. The contemporary writer Roger North was most impressed by Charlotte Butler's singing of Cupid, describing it as "beyond anything I ever heard upon the stage", partly ascribing her success to "the liberty she had of concealing her face, which she could not endure should be so contorted as is necessary to sound well, before her gallants, or at least her envious sex."

King Arthur was revived at least twice during Purcell's lifetime and continued to be performed in the later 1690s. The first major revival in the eighteenth century was staged in 1736. This production left the work unaltered, but later revivals involved varying degrees of revision. They included a performance in Dublin in 1763; David Garrick and Thomas Arne's version in 1770; and John Kemble and Thomas Linley's transformation of King Arthur into a two-act after-piece entitled Arthur and Emmeline in 1784.

== Libretto ==
=== Interpretation based on political allegory ===
According to Curtis Price, the original 1684–5 version was probably an allegory of the Exclusion crisis, a major political dispute over who would succeed Charles II: his Catholicos, James, Duke of York or the Duke of Monmouth, his illegitimate — but Protestant — son. The faction backing James was nicknamed the "Tories"; that in favour of Monmouth, the "Whigs". The latter were led by Anthony Ashley-Cooper, the Earl of Shaftesbury. Dryden was a convinced Tory and had already satirised Shaftesbury and other Whigs in his poem Absalom and Achitophel (1681). In Price's reading, King Arthur represents Charles II, the Britons are the Tories, and the Saxons are the Whigs. Oswald is the Duke of Monmouth and Osmond/Grimbald is the Earl of Shaftesbury. Philidel is the Marquess of Halifax, a political moderate much admired by Dryden (he would dedicate the printed edition of King Arthur to Halifax). Emmeline personifies the "national conscience."

=== Sources and influences ===
Dryden did not base his libretto on standard versions of Arthurian myth, although he was familiar with such books as Geoffrey of Monmouth's Historia Regum Britanniae. He did, however, use other works of literature as sources of inspiration. There are clear parallels between King Arthur and Shakespeare's The Tempest (which Dryden had revised in line with Restoration taste in collaboration with Sir William Davenant in 1667 and which had been turned into a semi-opera with music by Matthew Locke in 1674). Ellen T. Harris has described the links between the characters: Prospero and Merlin are both good magicians who use an "airy spirit" (Ariel in The Tempest, Philidel in King Arthur) to defeat a potential usurper (Alonzo/Oswald). The relationship between Arthur and Emmeline is like that between Ferdinand and Miranda. Like Miranda, Emmeline is an innocent who has "never seen a man" (quite literally true in the case of the blind Emmeline). Finally, there are obvious similarities between the "earthy spirits" Grimbald and Caliban, although there is no evil wizard corresponding to Osmond in The Tempest.

Dryden also used material he found in epic poetry: the idea of the "enchanted wood" is taken from Canto XVIII of Tasso's Gerusalemme liberata; and Andrew Pinnock suggests the rivalry between Arthur and Oswald is like the conflict between Gondibert and Oswald in Sir William Davenant's unfinished poem Gondibert (1650).

In his preface, Dryden explained how he had conducted historical research into Germanic paganism to write the sacrifice scene in the first act: "When I wrote it, seven years ago, I employ'd some reading about it, to inform my self out of Beda, Bochartus, and other Authors, concerning the rites of the Heathen Saxons...". But Andrew Pinnock believes "practically all the ritual came from a far handier source (which unaccountably Dryden forgot to mention): Aylett Sammes's Britannia Antiqua Illustrata (1676)."

== Music ==
The Frost Scene in the third act has always attracted praise from critics. Edward J. Dent wrote, "The Frost Scene is one of Purcell's most famous achievements" with "its bold contrasts of style, and the masterly piling up of the music to a climax at the end of the chorus ''Tis love that has warmed us'". Thomas Gray, commenting on the 1736 production, described it as "excessive fine" and said that the Cold Genius' solo was "the finest song in the play". This aria ("What power art thou who from below") is accompanied by shivering strings, probably influenced by a scene from Act IV of Jean-Baptiste Lully's opera Isis (1677); but, as Peter Holman writes, Purcell's "daring chromatic harmonies transform the Cold Genius from the picturesque figure of Lully (or Dryden, for that matter) into a genuinely awe-inspiring character — the more so because Cupid's responses are set to such frothy and brilliant music". It has been suggested that the whole scene was inspired by the frost fairs held on the Thames during the 1680s.

Venus' act V air "Fairest Isle" achieved wide fame, inspiring Charles Wesley's hymn "Love Divine, All Loves Excelling" to the same tune.

"What power art thou who from below" was recorded by Klaus Nomi on his eponymous first album as "The Cold Song". In his album Beacon released on 28 July 2021, Susumu Hirasawa recorded the same aria as "Cold Song" with lyrics rewritten in Japanese and included it in the album.

The prelude to Act III serves as the basis for the piece Chasing Sheep Is Best Left to Shepherds in Michael Nyman's score for the 1982 movie The Draughtsman's Contract. Nyman then reused it for his 1984 Memorial and again in 1989 in the score for The Cook, the Thief, His Wife & Her Lover.

== Roles ==
Cast	Voice type	Premiere cast, May/June? 1691
King Arthur	spoken role	Thomas Betterton
Oswald, King of Kent, a Saxon and a Heathen	spoken role	Joseph Williams
Conon, Duke of Cornwal, Tributary to King Arthur	spoken role	John Hodgson
Merlin, a famous Inchanter	spoken role	Edward Kynaston
Osmond, a Saxon Magician, and a Heathen	spoken role	Samuel Sandford
Aurelius, Friend to Arthur	spoken role	John Verbruggen ("Alexander")
Albanact, Captain of Arthur's Guards	spoken role	William Bowen
Guillamar, Friend to Oswald	spoken role	Joseph Harris
Emmeline, Daughter of Conon	spoken role	Anne Bracegirdle
Matilda, Her Attendant	spoken role	Mrs. Richardson
Philidel, an Airy Spirit/Cupid	soprano	Charlotte Butler
Grimbald, an Earthy Spirit	bass or baritone?	John Bowman
Saxon Priests	bass (or baritone) and tenor	one played by John Bowman
Two Valkyries	soprano and alto	
British Warrior	tenor	
Shepherds and Shepherdesses	tenor, two sopranos/SATB chorus	
Cold Genius	bass	
Two Sirens	sopranos	
Three Nymphs	sopranos	
Aeolus	bass	
Nereid	soprano	
Pan	bass	
Venus	soprano	
He (in Mr. Howe's song)	bass	
She (in Mr. Howe's song)	soprano	
Comus	bass	
Honour	soprano	

== Synopsis ==
(Musical numbers given in bold)

=== Act 1 ===
Scene 1

- **1. Overture**
- **2. Air**
- **3. Overture**

The Britons prepare for the battle which will decide who will rule their land: the Christian Arthur or the pagan Saxon Oswald. It augurs well for them: it is Saint George's Day and the Britons have already defeated the Saxons in ten battles. Conon, Duke of Cornwall, explains the origins of the war. Oswald had sought his daughter, the blind Emmeline's, hand in marriage but she rejected him because she is in love with Arthur. Arthur enters reading a letter of support from his magician Merlin. He meets Emmeline and tries to explain to her what seeing means. A trumpet calls Arthur to battle.

Scene 2: The scene represents a place of Heathen worship; The three Saxon Gods, Woden, Thor, and Freya placed on Pedestals. An Altar.

Oswald and his magician Osmond sacrifice horses and pray to the Saxon gods for victory in the coming battle. Osmond's servant, the spirit Grimbald, arrives and says he has persuaded six Saxons to offer themselves as a human sacrifice. He also admits he has lost control of the other spirit, Philidel, "a puleing Sprite" who "Sighs when he should plunge a Soul in Sulphur,/As with Compassion touched of foolish man." Philidel was supposed to have drawn up the vapours from the marsh and blown them in the face of the Christian soldiers but when he saw the crosses on their banners, he refused to carry out this task. Osmond says he will punish Philidel later.

The sacrifice scene:

- **4. "Woden, first to thee"** (Tenor, bass and chorus)
- **5. "The white horse neigh'd aloud"** (Tenor and alto)
- **6. "The lot is cast, and Tanfan pleas'd"** (Soprano)
- **7. "Brave souls, to be renown'd in story"** (Chorus)
- **8. "I call you all to Woden's hall"** (Alto and chorus)

Scene 3: "A battle supposed to be given behind the Scenes, with Drums, Trumpets, and military Shouts and Excursions."

The Britons sing a song of triumph as the Saxons flee the battlefield:

- **9. "Come if you dare"** (Symphony followed by tenor and chorus)

=== Act 2 ===
Scene 1

The tender-hearted Philidel pities those soldiers who have lost their lives in the battle. Merlin arrives in his chariot and orders Philidel to tell him who he is. Philidel explains he is a spirit of the air and one of the fallen angels, but he has repented. He deserts Osmond and joins Merlin. Philidel tells Merlin that Grimbald is planning to deceive the victorious Britons by leading them to drown in rivers or fall off cliffs. Merlin leaves Philidel his band of spirits to save the Britons from this trap. Grimbald arrives disguised as a shepherd guiding Arthur and his men. Philidel and his spirits and Grimbald and his spirits compete to win Arthur's trust:

- **10. "Hither this way"** (Chorus)
- **11. "Let not a moonborn elf deceive thee"** (Grimbald)
- **12. "Hither this way"** (Chorus)
- **13. "Come follow me"** (Philidel and spirits)

Grimbald admits defeat, vows revenge on Philidel and vanishes.

Scene 2: A pavilion

Emmeline and her maid Matilda await news of the battle. To pass the time, a "Crew of Kentish Lads and Lasses" entertain them with songs and dances:

- **14. "How blest are the shepherds, how happy their lasses"** (Shepherd and chorus)
- **15. "Shepherd, shepherd, leave decoying"** (Two shepherdesses)
- **16a. Hornpipe**
- **16b. "Come, shepherds, lead up a lively measure"** (Chorus of shepherds)

Oswald and his comrade Guillamar stray from the battlefield, chance upon the pavilion and kidnap Emmeline and Matilda.

Scene 3

A group of Britons continue the battle.

Scene 4

Arthur holds a parley with Oswald and begs him to return Emmeline, offering him land from the River Medway to the Severn, but Oswald refuses to relinquish her.

- **17. Second Act Tune: Air**

=== Act 3 ===
Scene 1

Arthur and his men attack Oswald's castle but Osmond's magic defeats them. Osmond has conjured a "Magick Wood" which bars access to the castle. Merlin promises to help Arthur reach Emmeline and restore her sight with potion in a vial.

Scene 2: A deep wood

Grimbald catches Philidel as he scouts the enchanted wood for Merlin. Philidel pretends to submit but secretly casts a spell on Grimbald which renders him powerless to move. Merlin asks Philidel to guide Arthur through the wood and gives him the vial, which the spirit uses to rid Emmeline of her blindness. Emmeline is amazed at the new world before her eyes. Merlin's spells also allow Arthur and Emmeline to meet for a brief moment and some performances insert the additional duet "You say 'tis love" here. Emmeline, however will not be free until the enchanted wood is destroyed. Osmond enters, intent on seducing Emmeline for himself, having drugged his master Oswald.

Osmond tries to win Emmeline over by showing her a masque acted by spirits. He conjures up a vision of "Yzeland" and "farthest Thule".

- **The Frost Scene**
- **18. Prelude**
- **19. "What ho! thou genius of this isle"** (Cupid wakes the "Cold Genius", who is the spirit of Winter).
- **20. "What Power art thou, who from below..."** (The Cold Genius reluctantly wakes from his slumbers)
- **21. "Thou doting fool"** (Cupid)
- **22. "Great Love, I know thee now"** (The Cold Genius acknowledge's love's power)
- **23. "No part of my dominion shall be waste"** (Cupid)
- **24. Prelude**
- **25. "See, see, we assemble"** (Chorus and dance of the Cold People)
- **26. "'Tis I that have warm'd ye"** (Cupid, followed by ritornello and chorus of Cold People: "'Tis Love that has warm'd us")
- **27. "Sound a parley"** (Cupid and Cold Genius, followed by ritornello and chorus)
- **28. Third Act Tune: Hornpipe**

The masque fails to persuade Emmeline and Osmond resorts to force but the captive Grimbald's shouts interrupt him. Osmond goes to free him, promising Emmeline he will be back.

=== Act 4 ===
Scene 1

The freed Grimbald warns Osmond that Arthur is approaching the enchanted wood, where Merlin has undone his spells. Osmond decides to replace the threatening spells with seductive ones.

Scene 2: Scene of the Wood continues

Merlin leaves Arthur at the entrance to the wood with the spirit Philidel as his guide. Philidel has a wand which will banish all magical deception. Arthur hears seductive music from two Sirens bathing in a stream.

- **29. "Two Daughters of this Aged Stream are we"**

Though tempted, Arthur realises it is an illusion and presses on. Next, "Nymphs and Sylvans" emerge from the trees singing and dancing.

- **30. Passacaglia: "How happy the lover"**

Again, Arthur rejects them and begins the task of destroying the wood. When he chops a tree with his sword, blood pours out of it and the voice of Emmeline cries out in pain. It convinces Arthur that it is Emmeline, who has been turned into a tree by Osmond, and Arthur is just about to embrace the tree when Philidel reveals it is really a trick by Grimbald. Philidel captures Grimbald and Arthur cuts down the tree, dispelling the enchantment from the wood and freeing the way to Oswald's castle. Philidel drags off Grimbald in chains.

- **31. Fourth Act Tune: Air**

=== Act 5 ===
Scene 1

Now his magic has been destroyed, Osmond is terrified of the approaching Arthur. He decides he must persuade Oswald to fight for him.

Scene 2

- **32. Trumpet tune**

Arthur and the Britons are preparing to storm the castle when Oswald comes out and challenges his rival to single combat for the hand of Emmeline and the crown. They fight and Arthur disarms Oswald. Arthur spares his life but tells Oswald he and his Saxons must return to Germany because the Britons "brook no Foreign Power/ To Lord it in a Land, Sacred to Freedom." Osmond is cast into a dungeon with Grimbald. Arthur is reunited with Emmeline and the work ends with a celebratory masque.

The final masque: Merlin conjures a vision of the ocean around Britain. The Four Winds create a storm which is calmed by Aeolus:

- **33. "Ye Blust'ring Brethren of the Skies"** (Aeolus)

allowing Britannia to rise from the waves on an island with fishermen at her feet.

- **34. Symphony** (The fishermen dance)
- **35. "Round thy Coasts, Fair Nymph of Britain"** (Duet for Pan and a Nereid)
- **36. "For Folded Flocks, on Fruitful Plains"** (Trio of male voices)
- **37. "Your hay it is Mow'd, and your Corn is Reap'd"** (Comus and peasants)
- **38. "Fairest Isle"** (Venus)
- **39. "You say 'tis love"** (Duet for "He" and "She"; according to the printed libretto, the words were written by "Mr. Howe")
- **40. "Trumpet Tune (Warlike Consort)** (Merlin reveals the Order of the Garter)
- **41. "Saint George, the Patron of our Isle"** (Honour and chorus)
- **42. Chaconne** (The masque ends with a "grand dance")

== Recordings ==
=== Audio ===
- King Arthur St Anthony Singers, Philomusica of London, conducted by Sir Anthony Lewis (Decca, 1958)
- King Arthur The Deller Consort & Choir, The King's Musick, Alfred Deller (Harmonia Mundi, 1979)
- King Arthur English Baroque Soloists, Monteverdi Choir, conducted by John Eliot Gardiner (Erato, 1985)
- King Arthur Les Arts Florissants, conducted by William Christie (Erato, 1995)
- King Arthur The English Concert and Choir, Trevor Pinnock (Archiv, 1992)
- King Arthur Le Concert Spirituel, conducted by Hervé Niquet (Glossa, 2004)
- King Arthur Vox Luminis, Lionel Meunier (Alpha, 2018)
- King Arthur Gabrieli Consort & Players, Paul McCreesh (Signum, 2019)

=== DVD ===
- King Arthur conducted by Nikolaus Harnoncourt (Euroarts, 2005)
- King Arthur, performed by Le Concert Spirituel conducted by Hervé Niquet, with the participation of Corinne & Gilles Benizio (alias Shirley & Dino), (Glossa, 2009)
