= The Ambitious Slave =

1694 play

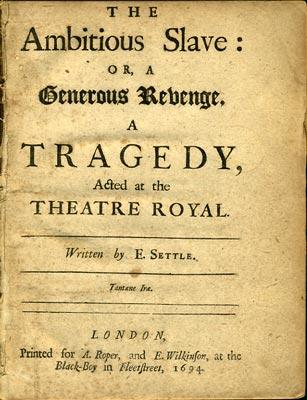
- Original language: English
- Written by: Elkanah Settle
- Genre: Tragedy

Premiere
- Date: 21 March 1694
- Place: Theatre Royal, Drury Lane, London

The Ambitious Slave; Or, A Generous Revenge is a 1694 tragedy by the English writer Elkanah Settle. It was first staged at the Theatre Royal, Drury Lane by the United Company.

The original cast included John Bowman as King of Persia, John Verbruggen as Tygranes, George Powell as Orontes, John Freeman as Briomar, Jane Rogers as Mirvan, Frances Maria Knight as Herminia, Anne Bracegirdle as Clarismunda, Elizabeth Barry as Celestina and Elinor Leigh as Rosalin.

== Bibliography ==
- Van Lennep, W. The London Stage, 1660-1800: Volume One, 1660-1700. Southern Illinois University Press, 1960.
