= Beacon (Susumu Hirasawa album) =

Studio album by Susumu Hirasawa
- Released: July 28, 2021
- Studio: Studio WIRESELF
- Genres: Art pop; electronic; experimental rock; industrial
- Length: 46:07
- Labels: Chaos Union, TESLAKITE CHTE-0085
- Producer: Susumu Hirasawa

Susumu Hirasawa chronology
The Man Climbing the Hologram (2015)	Beacon (2021)	The Book of Phytoelectron (2024)

Beacon is the fourteenth solo album by Susumu Hirasawa.

== Overview ==
Beacon is Hirasawa's first mainline solo album since The Man Climbing the Hologram in 2015. The six-year gap broke a pattern existent since 2000 of one mainline album every three years; this excludes Kaku P-Model releases which did not follow the pattern.

Two of the album's songs, "COLD SONG" and "The End of TIMELINE", were made public ahead of the album's release; first performed at the 24 Mandala shows in April 2021, and later studio renditions were published on Hirasawa's official YouTube channel on July 21.

Due to the "deteriorating international postal situation" as a result of the COVID-19 pandemic, the album was not available for international shipping through the album's label, TESLAKITE. In response, both Beacon and Kai=Kai were made available as digital downloads through Bandcamp.

Members of Hirasawa's official fan club, Green Nerve, could additionally download karaoke versions of the album's songs and a second version of "The Man Who Falls Down" for free, even if they had not bought the album.

"COLD SONG" is the first cover to be included in a mainline Hirasawa solo album. The song is an adapted rendition with new lyrics of the song of the same name by Klaus Nomi from his 1981 album Klaus Nomi, itself an adaptation of the aria "What Power art thou, who from below..." from Henry Purcell's 1691 semi-opera King Arthur.

== Track listing ==
All lyrics are written by Susumu Hirasawa; all music is composed by Hirasawa, except "COLD SONG", by Henry Purcell.

No.	Title	Length
1.	"BEACON"	3:46
2.	"The Cognitive Another World of the Logical Coterie" (論理的同人の認知的別世界 Ronri-teki Dōjin no Ninchi-teki Bessekai)	4:24
3.	"Disappearing TOPIA" (消えるTOPIA Kieru TOPIA)	5:54
4.	"The Man Who Falls Down" (転倒する男 Tentō Suru Otoko)	3:43
5.	"Ranks of Burning Flowers" (燃える花の隊列 Moeru Hana no Tairetsu)	6:18
6.	"LANDING"	4:00
7.	"COLD SONG"	3:37
8.	"Ghost Train" (幽霊列車 Yūrei Ressha)	3:44
9.	"The End of TIMELINE" (TIMELINEの終わり TIMELINE no Owari)	5:02
10.	"ZCONITE"	1:15
11.	"BEACON of Memory" (記憶のBEACON Kioku no BEACON)	4:24
Total length:		46:07

== Personnel ==
- Susumu Hirasawa – Vocals, guitar, keyboard, personal computer, digital audio workstation, synthesizer, sampler, sequencer, programming, production
- Masanori Chinzei – Recording, mixing, mastering
- Toshifumi Nakai – Design
- Syotaro Takami – Translation
- Presented by Chaos Union/TESLAKITE: Mika Hirano, Rihito Yumoto, Kinuko Mochizuki and Kenta Kogure

== Chart performance ==
Chart	Peak position
Oricon Albums Chart	12
Oricon Indie Albums Chart	2
