= 1761 in literature =

This article contains information about the literary events and publications of 1761.

== Events ==
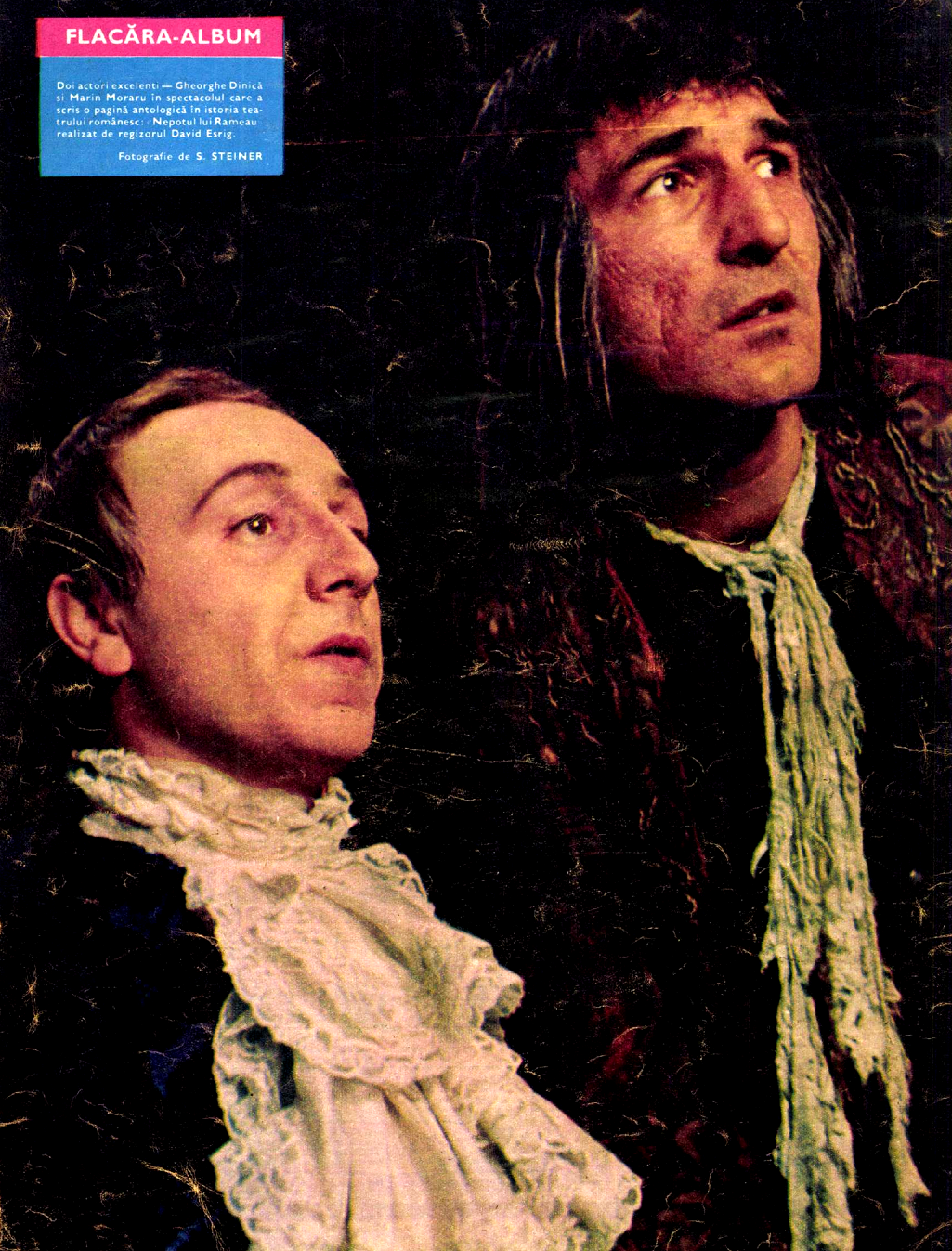
Gheorghe Dinică (on the right) and Marin Moraru in David Esrig's 1968 stage adaptation of Rameau's Nephew, Bulandra Theater, Bucharest); photograph by S. Steiner for Flacăra

- August – Following the death of Johann Matthias Gesner, the chair of rhetoric at the University of Göttingen is refused by both Johann August Ernesti and David Ruhnken. It eventually goes to Christian Gottlob Heyne.
- September – Carlo Goldoni informs fellow playwright Francesco Albergati Capacelli that he is moving permanently from Venice to Paris, where he is appointed director of the Italian theatre.
- unknown date – Denis Diderot begins writing Rameau's Nephew.

== New books ==
=== Fiction ===
- John Hawkesworth – Almoran and Hamet
- William Kenrick – Eloisa
- Thomas Percy (translated) – Hau Kou Choan
- James Ridley (as Sir Charles Morrell) – The History of James Lovegrove
- Jean-Jacques Rousseau – Julie, ou la nouvelle Héloïse
- Frances Sheridan – Memoirs of Miss Sidney Bidulph
- Laurence Sterne – The Life and Opinions of Tristram Shandy, Gentleman vols. iii – iv.

=== Drama ===
- Isaac Bickerstaffe – Judith
- Henry Brooke – The Earl of Essex (adapted)
- George Colman the Elder – The Jealous Wife
- Richard Cumberland – The Banishment of Cicero
- Richard Glover – Medea
- Carlo Goldoni
  - Una delle ultime sere di Carnevale
  - La villeggiatura (or La trilogia della villeggiatura, The Resort)
- Carlo Gozzi
  - L'amore delle tre melarance (The Love for Three Oranges)
  - Il corvo (The Raven)
- Arthur Murphy
  - All in the Wrong
  - The Citizen
  - The Old Maid

=== Poetry ===
- John Armstrong – A Day: An epistle to John Wilkes
- Charles Churchill
  - The Apology
  - Night: An epistle to Robert Lloyd
  - The Rosciad
- John Cleland – The Times!, vol. 2
- Francis Fawkes – Original Poems and Translations
- Robert Lloyd – An Epistle to Charles Churchill
- James Macpherson, "translator" – Fingal, an Ancient Epic Poem in Six Books, together with Several Other Poems composed by Ossian, the Son of Fingal, translated from the Gaelic Language
- Diego de Torres Villarroel – Poesías sagradas y profanas

=== Non-fiction ===
- Thomas Cole – Discourses on Luxury, Infidelity, and Enthusiasm
- George Colman the Elder – Critical Reflections on the Old English Dramatick Writers
- Robert Dodsley – Select Fables of Esop and Other Fabulists (anthology)
- Enrique Flórez – Memorias de las reinas católicas
- Edward Gibbon – Essai sur l’Étude de la Littérature
- Baron d'Holbach – Christianity unveiled
- Henry Home – Introduction to the Art of Thinking
- David Hume – The History of England, from the Invasion of Julius Caesar to the Accession of Henry VII
- Joseph Priestley – The Rudiments of English Grammar
- Tiphaigne de la Roche – L'Empire des Zaziris sur les humains ou la Zazirocratie
- Martín Sarmiento – Noticia sobre la verdadera patria de Cervantes
- Benjamin Victor – History of the Theatres of London and Dublin vol. 1–2

== Births ==
- March 8 – Jan Potocki, Polish count, military engineer, ethnologist, Egyptologist, linguist, aeronaut, adventurer and novelist (suicide 1815)
- May 3 – August von Kotzebue, German dramatist (died 1819)
- July 25 – Charlotte von Kalb, German writer (died 1843)
- September 8 – François Juste Marie Raynouard, French dramatist (died 1836)
- September 13 – Santō Kyōden, born Iwase Samuru, Japanese fiction writer, poet and artist (died 1816)
- November 13 – Elizabeth Meeke, English popular novelist (died c.1826)
- Unknown dates
  - Mary Pilkington, English novelist, poet and children's writer (died 1839)
  - Mariana Starke, English playwright and travel writer (died 1838)

== Deaths ==
- February 25 – Daniel Henchman, Colonial American bookseller and publisher (born 1689)
- April 9 – William Law, English theologian (born 1686)
- April 15 – William Oldys, English antiquary and bibliographer (born 1696)
- April 17 – Benjamin Hoadly, English bishop and instigator of the Bangorian Controversy (born 1676)
- July 4 – Samuel Richardson, English novelist (born 1689)
- August 3 – Johann Matthias Gesner, German librarian and classicist (born 1691)
- December 15 – Henrietta Louisa Fermor, Countess of Pomfret, English letter writer (born 1698)
