= The Maid's Last Prayer =

1693 play

- Original language: English
- Written by: Thomas Southerne
- Genre: Restoration Comedy
- Setting: London, Present Day

Premiere
- Date: February 1693
- Place: Theatre Royal, Drury Lane, London

The Maid's Last Prayer: Or, Any Rather Than Fail is a 1693 comedy play by the Irish writer Thomas Southerne. It was first staged at the Theatre Royal, Drury Lane by the United Company.

The original cast included George Powell as Granger, John Bowman as Gayman, John Verbruggen as Garnish, Thomas Doggett as Lord Malepert, George Bright as Sir Ruff Rancounter, William Bowen as Sir Symphony, Cave Underhill as Drydrubb, William Pinkethman as Porter, Carey Perin as Christian, Elizabeth Barry as Lady Malepert, Anne Bracegirdle as Lady Trickitt, Susanna Mountfort as Lady Susan Malepert, Jane Rogers as Maria, Mary Betterton as Wishwell, Elinor Leigh as Siam and Mary Kent as Florence. It included music composed by Henry Purcell. The published version was dedicated to Charles Boyle.

== Bibliography ==
- Van Lennep, W. The London Stage, 1660-1800: Volume One, 1660-1700. Southern Illinois University Press, 1960.
