= The City-Heiress =

Play by Aphra Behn

The City Heiress
- Original language: English
- Written by: Aphra Behn
- Genre: Comedy

Premiere
- Date: April 1682
- Place: Dorset Garden Theatre, London

The City-Heiress, or, Sir Timothy Treat-all is a play by Aphra Behn first performed in 1682. The play, a Restoration comedy, reflects Behn's own highly Royalist political point of view.

The character of Sir Timothy Treat-all is a caricature of the first Earl of Shaftesbury, a founder of the Whig party who had been arrested for high treason in 1681.

It was staged at the Dorset Garden Theatre by the Duke's Company. The original cast included James Nokes as Sir Timothy Treatall, Thomas Betterton as Tom Wilding, Anthony Leigh as Sir Anthony Meriwill, Joseph Williams as Sir Charles Meriwill, John Bowman as Dreswell, Thomas Jevon as Fopington, Elizabeth Barry as Lady Galliard, Charlotte Butler as Charlotte, Elizabeth Currer as Diana and Elinor Leigh as Mrs Closet.

== Plot ==
The play concerns the "seditious knight" Sir Timothy Treat-all and his rakish Tory nephew Tom Wilding. Both vie for the affections of Charlot, the eponymous city (London) heiress. Treat-all keeps an open house for all of those who oppose the king, and he has disinherited Wilding.

Wilding launches a complex scheme to triumph over Treat-all. First, he introduces Diana (his mistress) to Treat-all as Charlot, allowing Treat-all to woo her. This allows him to court the real Charlot himself. Diana cares for Wilding, but after seeing him pursue both Charlot and Lady Galliard, she decides to make an advantageous marriage with the wealthy Treat-all.

During a staged entertainment, Wilding assumes a disguise and pretends to be a Polish nobleman. He offers Treat-all the throne of Poland, which the greedy Treat-all accepts. Wilding then arranges for a burglary, where he and Treat-all both end up bound, and the burglars take all of Treat-all's papers. The burglars are Wilding's confidants, and the papers contain evidence of Treat-all's treason.

Wilding ends up marrying Charlot, and Treat-all marries Diana. However, Treat-all is forced by blackmail to treat Wilding well and to leave him his estates. (((

In a sub-plot, Wilding successfully seduces the rich widow Lady Galliard. Shortly afterwards, one of her drunken former suitors (Sir Charles) breaks into her chamber and begins to undress. In order to get rid of him (and thinking that he will not remember their conversation), she agrees to marry him. She is then shocked to discover that two other people have overheard her make a legally binding promise of marriage.

== Reception ==
Contemporaries singled out The City Heiress as one of Behn's "good" and lucrative comedies, although few modern critics have discussed it at length.

The City Heiress was one of Behn's plays singled out by satirists for scorn. Referring to the epilogue, Robert Gould sarcastically asked,

"The City Heiress, by chast Sappho Writ:
Where the Lewd Widow comes, with brazen Face,
Just reeking from a Stallion's rank Embrace
T'acquaint the Audience with her Filthy Case.
Where can you find a Scene for juster Praise,
In Shakespear, Johnson, or in Fletcher's Plays?" -- The Play-House, a Satyr

Behn's play has been called "a comedy of libertine complicity: her characters act as though they believed in order, authority, true love, and marriage even though they celebrate for the better part of five acts their license to disbelieve".

Other Restoration comedies were as frank with their sexuality, and others had women choosing their lovers on the basis of their wit (while wits choose theirs on the basis of money), but Behn's characters do not moderate their desires in their comedic solutions. Further, Treat-all's punishment is poverty and subjugation, rather than being hanged; and Wilding's goal is luxury, rather than moral justice. The distinctions are subtle, but it was not merely Behn's sex that made the play offensive to moralizing poets of the 1690s and the first decade of the 18th century.
