= The Fortune Hunters =

1689 play

- 1714 edition
- Original language: English
- Written by: James Carlile
- Genre: Restoration Comedy

Premiere
- Date: March 1689
- Place: Theatre Royal, Drury Lane, London

The Fortune Hunters; Or, Two Fools Well Met is 1689 comedy play by James Carlile. It was originally staged by the United Company at the Theatre Royal, Drury Lane in London.

The original Drury Lane cast included Anthony Leigh as Sir William Wealthy, Edward Kynaston as Tom Wealthy, William Mountfort as Young Wealthy, James Nokes as Spruce, John Bowman as Littlegad, Elinor Leigh as The Lady Sly, Charlotte Butler as Sophia, Susanna Mountfort as Maria and Frances Maria Knight as Mrs Spruce.

The work remained popular into the eighteenth century. It was revived at the Queen's Theatre, Haymarket in 1707 with a cast featuring William Bullock, John Mills, Robert Wilks, George Pack, Henry Norris, Lucretia Bradshaw, Margaret Bicknell and Anne Oldfield. This led to further stagings at the Haymarket in 1708 and 1709, followed by Drury Lane in 1711 and Lincoln's Inn Fields in 1717 and 1728.

== Bibliography ==
- Canfield, J. Douglas. Tricksters and Estates: On the Ideology of Restoration Comedy. University Press of Kentucky, 2014.
- Van Lennep, W. The London Stage, 1660–1800: Volume One, 1660–1700. Southern Illinois University Press, 1960.
