= The Virtuous Wife (play) =

1679 play

- Original language: English
- Written by: Thomas D'Urfey
- Genre: Restoration Comedy

Premiere
- Date: September 1679
- Place: Theatre Royal, Drury Lane, London

The Virtuous Wife; Or, Good Luck At Last is a 1679 comedy play by the English writer Thomas D'Urfey. It was originally performed by the Duke's Company at the Dorset Garden Theatre in London.

The original cast included Henry Harris as Beverly, William Smith as Beauford, Thomas Jevon as Sir Frolack Whimsey, Anthony Leigh as Sir Lubbery Widgeon, Cave Underhill as Amble, John Bowman as Crotchett, James Nokes as Lady Beardly, Elizabeth Barry as Olivia and Elizabeth Currer as Jenny Wheedle.

== Bibliography ==
- Van Lennep, W. The London Stage, 1660-1800: Volume One, 1660-1700. Southern Illinois University Press, 1960.
