= Dame Dobson =

1683 play

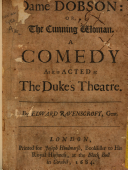
- Original language: English
- Written by: Edward Ravenscroft
- Genre: Restoration Comedy

Premiere
- Date: 31 May 1683
- Place: Dorset Garden Theatre, London

Dame Dobson is a 1683 comedy play by the English writer Edward Ravenscroft.

First staged by the United Company at the Dorset Garden Theatre, the original cast included Katherine Corey as Dame Dobson, Edward Kynaston as Collonel, Thomas Jevon as Gillet, John Wiltshire as Gerrard, William Mountfort as Hartwell, George Bright as Farmer, John Richards as Goslin, Anthony Leigh as Jenkin, Mary Lee as Lady Noble, Elizabeth Currer as Mrs Featly, Elinor Leigh as Mrs Prudence, Charlotte Butler as Mrs Cleremont and Margaret Osborne as Mrs Hellen.

In 1726 Charles Johnson wrote a reworking of the plot as The Female Fortune Teller.

== Plot ==
Dame Dobson; or, The Cunning Woman (1683) is a satirical play featuring a fraudulent "cunning woman" who runs a deceptive business, using tricks and illusions to fool desperate clients from various social classes. The plot follows her comedic interactions with customers, including those seeking physical invulnerability, the death of a spouse, physical enhancement, or a gender transformation, all of which she handles through staged, farcical enchantments.

The Vulnerable Citizen: A young man approaches her seeking a magical charm that will make him entirely invulnerable to physical harm.

The Scheming Wife: A lady requests a prophecy predicting exactly when her husband will die so that she can freely marry a handsome colonel.

The Vain Country Girl: A young country girl visits the Dame wishing for a spell to enlarge her breasts.

The Eccentric Welshwoman: A Welsh country woman demands to be transformed into a man so she can enjoy more freedom and successfully woo a wealthy lady.

The play exposes human gullibility and greed in 17th-century London through these episodes, highlighted by the Dame’s use of a fake, rigged version of Friar Bacon's Brazen Head to deliver false prophecies. This farcical, episodic structure highlights the booming market for fraudulent spiritualism.

== Bibliography ==
- Canfield, J. Douglas. Tricksters and Estates: On the Ideology of Restoration Comedy. University Press of Kentucky, 2014. ISBN 978-0-8131-5752-8.
- Van Lennep, W. The London Stage, 1660-1800: Volume One, 1660-1700. Southern Illinois University Press, 1960.
