= Joy to Great Caesar =

Song by Tom D'Urfey

"Joy to Great Caesar" was a Royalist and anti-Catholic political song written by Thomas D'Urfey during the reign of Charles II of England.

D'Urfey, a Tory by sympathies, set his own lyrics to the tune of Farinel's Ground by Michel Farinelli, in which he criticized Catholic political designs and praised the King. D'Urfey's friend Joseph Addison later claimed that the success of the song so damaged the political prospects of the Whigs that they never recovered during the reign of Charles II, and that by using the music of the Catholic composer Farinelli for his anti-Catholic lyrics, D'Urfey had turned a considerable part of the Pope's music against himself. Macaulay described the song as "a loyal ode, which had lately been written by Durfey, and which, though like all Durfey's writings, utterly contemptible, was, at that time, almost as popular as Lillibullero became a few years later." He also recorded that the song was sung in a triumphal march by the newly elected members and "a long train of knights and squires," after an unpopular and controversial Tory electoral victory in Cheshire in 1685.
