= A Fool's Preferment =

1688 play

- Original language: English
- Written by: Thomas D'Urfey
- Genre: Restoration Comedy

Premiere
- Date: April 1688
- Place: Dorset Garden Theatre, London

A Fool's Preferment; Or, The Three Dukes Of Dunstable is a 1688 comedy play by the English writer Thomas D'Urfey. It is a reworking of John Fletcher's Jacobean work The Noble Gentleman. It was first performed by the United Company at the Dorset Garden Theatre in London. Henry Purcell composed the play's incidental music. It was his first major work composing for the theatre in seven years since Sir Barnaby Whigg.

The original cast featured James Nokes as Cocklebrain, Anthony Leigh as Justice, William Mountfort as Lyonel, Edward Kynaston as Clermont, George Powell as Longevile, John Bowman as Bewford, Thomas Jevon as Toby, Martin Powell as Usher and Elizabeth Boutell as Aurelia.

== Bibliography ==
- Canfield, J. Douglas. Tricksters and Estates: On the Ideology of Restoration Comedy. University Press of Kentucky, 2014.
- Price, Curtis A. Henry Purcell and the London Stage. Cambridge University Press, 1984.
- Van Lennep, W. The London Stage, 1660-1800: Volume One, 1660-1700. Southern Illinois University Press, 1960.
