= Love for Money =

1691 play

- Original language: English
- Written by: Thomas D'Urfey
- Genre: Restoration Comedy

Premiere
- Date: January 1691
- Place: Theatre Royal, Drury Lane, London

Love For Money, also known as The Boarding School, is a 1691 comedy play by the English writer Thomas D'Urfey. It was originally staged at the Theatre Royal, Drury Lane by the United Company. In 1733 it was adapted into a ballad opera The Boarding School by Charles Coffey.

In 2025 a lost work from the play, the song As Soon as Day Began To Peep by English composer Henry Purcell, was rediscovered in the Worcestershire County Archives by Caro Lesemann-Elliott, a researcher on the 'Music, Heritage, Place' project (co-led by Kirsten Gibson, Stephen Rose, and Nancy Kerr); it was unknown to modern scholars. Announcing the find, music professor Stephen Rose said the song was written for a character called Monsieur le Prate, a French fop who is "not quite in control of his emotions" in trying to woo a woman: "He comically compares himself to a cat howling and scratching at the door of his beloved, with Purcell representing the miaows in music." He added that, at the play's performance in London, audience members booed it as a malicious attack on a girls’ boarding school in Chelsea where D’Urfey had stayed in 1690: "Purcell’s opera Dido and Aeneas was performed at the same school in around 1687, so it is interesting to see Purcell also involved in a play that satirised the venue of his opera and the girls who sang in it."

== Original cast ==
- Cave Underhill as Sir Rowland Rakehell
- William Mountfort as Jack Amorous
- John Hodgson as Will Merriton
- John Freeman as Old Merriton
- George Powell as Nedd Bragg alias Captain Bouncer
- George Bright as Old Zachary Bragg
- Thomas Doggett as Deputy Nincompoop
- William Bowen as Monsieur Le Prate
- Mr. Kirkham as Singing Master
- John Bowman as Dancing Master
- Mr. Peire as Presbyterian Parson
- Anthony Leigh as Lady Addleplot
- Mrs. Richardson as Lady Straddle
- Anne Bracegirdle as Mirtilla
- Frances Maria Knight as Miss Jenny
- Mrs. Davies as Miss Molly
- Charlotte Butler as Betty Jiltall
- Katherine Corey as Crowstich
- Margaret Osborne as Teareshift
- Elinor Leigh as Oyley

== Bibliography ==
- Van Lennep, W. The London Stage, 1660-1800: Volume One, 1660-1700. Southern Illinois University Press, 1960.
