= The Female Virtuosos =

1693 play

- Original language: English
- Written by: Thomas Wright
- Genre: Comedy

Premiere
- Date: May 1693
- Place: Dorset Garden Theatre

The Female Virtuosos is a 1693 comedy play by the English writer Thomas Wright. It is based on the 1672 play Les Femmes Savantes by the French writer Molière about two young sisters who try and get out of a marriage arrangement with a foppish idiot so they can marry the men they love.

It was staged by the United Company at the Dorset Garden Theatre in London. The cast included Cave Underhill as Sir Maurice Meanwell, George Bright as Sir Timothy Witless, John Bowman as Sir Maggot Jingle, George Powell as Clerimont, John Hodgson as Meanwell, Joseph Haines as Bully, Frances Maria Knight as Mrs Leigh Lovewitt, Anne Bracegirdle as Mariana, Susanna Mountfort as Catchat, Elinor Leigh as Lady Meanwell and Jane Rogers as Lucy. Thomas Doggett wrote and performed the prologue. Incidental music was provided by Henry Purcell.

It was revived in 1721 by the Lincoln's Inn Fields Theatre to run against Colley Cibber's The Refusal, a new adaptation of Molière's original play.

== Bibliography ==
- Koon, Helene. Colley Cibber: A Biography. University Press of Kentucky, 2014.
