= The Wives Excuse =

1691 English comedy play

- Original language: English
- Written by: Thomas Southerne
- Genre: Restoration Comedy
- Setting: London, present day

Premiere
- Date: December 1691
- Place: Theatre Royal, Drury Lane, London

The Wives Excuse also The Wives Excuse; Or, Cuckolds Make Themselves is a 1691 comedy play by the Anglo-Irish writer Thomas Southerne. The title is sometimes written more grammatically as The Wives' Excuse.

It was originally staged at the Theatre Royal, Drury Lane by the United Company with a cast that included Thomas Betterton as Lovemore, Edward Kynaston as Wellvile, Joseph Williams as Wilding, John Bowman as Courtall, William Mountfort as Friendall, George Bright as Ruffle, Joseph Harris as Musick Master, Elizabeth Barry as Mrs Friendall, Anne Bracegirdle as Mrs Sightly, Susanna Mountfort as Mrs Wittwoud and Katherine Corey as Mrs Teazall.

== Bibliography ==
- Van Lennep, W. The London Stage, 1660-1800: Volume One, 1660-1700. Southern Illinois University Press, 1960.
