= The Volunteers (play) =

- Original language: English
- Written by: Thomas Shadwell
- Genre: Restoration comedy

Premiere
- Date: November 1692
- Place: Theatre Royal, Drury Lane, London

The Volunteers is a 1692 comedy play by the English writer Thomas Shadwell. Shadwell completed the play shortly before his death and it was performed posthumously at the Drury Lane Theatre by the United Company. It is also known by the long title The Volunteers; or, The Stock-Jobbers.

The original Drury Lane cast featured Anthony Leigh as Major General Blunt, Thomas Doggett as Colonel Hackett senior, George Powell as Colonel Hacket junior, John Hodgson as Welford, John Bowman as Sir Nicholas Dainty, William Bowen as Sir Timothy Kastril, John Verbruggen as Nickum, John Freeman as Dingboy, William Pinkethman as Stitchum, Frances Maria Knight as Teresia, Susanna Verbruggen as Eugenia, Jane Rogers as Winifred, Anne Bracegirdle as Clara and Elinor Leigh as Mrs Hackwell. Shadwell dedicated the published version of the play to Queen Mary.

It was revived at Drury Lane in 1711.

== Bibliography ==
- Marshall, Ashley. The Practice of Satire in England, 1658–1770. JHU Press, 2013.
- Watson, George. The New Cambridge Bibliography of English Literature: Volume 2, 1660-1800. Cambridge University Press, 1971.
