= The Revenge (Behn play) =

1680 play by Aphra Behn

- Original language: English
- Written by: Aphra Behn
- Genre: Restoration Comedy

Premiere
- Date: June 1680
- Place: Dorset Garden Theatre, London

The Revenge; Or, A Match In Newgate is a 1680 comedy play usually attributed to the English writer Aphra Behn. It was first performed by the Duke's Company at the Dorset Garden Theatre in London with a cast that included William Smith as Wellman, Joseph Williams as Friendly, John Bowman as Mr Shatter, Thomas Jevon as Trickwell, Anthony Leigh as Mr Dashit, George Bright as Glisten, Elizabeth Barry as Corina, Charlotte Butler as Marinda, Emily Price as Diana, and Elinor Leigh as Mrs Dashit.

== Bibliography ==
- Cox, Michael (2005). The Concise Oxford Chronology of English Literature. Oxford University Press. ISBN 978-0-19-861054-0.
- Van Lennep, William, ed. (1960). The London Stage, 1660-1800: Volume One, 1660-1700. Southern Illinois University Press. OCLC 1083463.
