= Bury Fair =

1689 play

- Written by: Thomas Shadwell
- Original language: English
- Genre: Restoration Comedy

Premiere
- Date premiered: April 1689
- Place premiered: Theatre Royal, Drury Lane, London

Bury Fair is a 1689 comedy play by the English writer Thomas Shadwell. It is part of the tradition of Restoration Comedy that flourished during the era. It was first staged by the United Company at the Theatre Royal, Drury Lane in London.

The original cast included Thomas Betterton as Lord Bellamy, William Mountfort as Wildish, Cave Underhill as Oldwit, James Nokes as Noddy, John Bowman as Trim, Anthony Leigh as Le Roch, William Bowen as Valet, Charlotte Butler as Charles, Katherine Corey as Lady Fantast, Elizabeth Boutell as Mrs Fantast, Susanna Mountfort as Mrs Gertrude. Shadwell dedicated the play to the Whig politician the Earl of Dorset.

== Bibliography ==
- Canfield, J. Douglas. Tricksters and Estates: On the Ideology of Restoration Comedy. University Press of Kentucky, 2014.
- Van Lennep, W. The London Stage, 1660-1800: Volume One, 1660-1700. Southern Illinois University Press, 1960.
