= Don Sebastian (play) =

Restoration tragedy by John Dryden

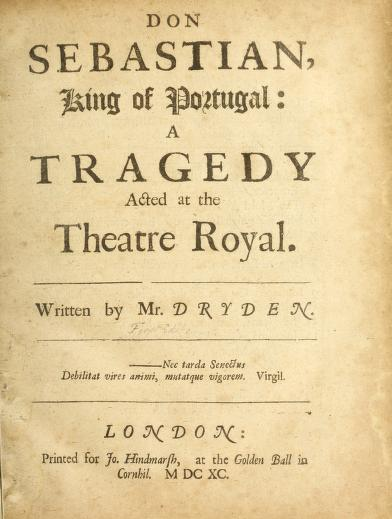
- Original language: English
- Written by: John Dryden
- Genre: Tragedy
- Setting: North Africa, 1578

Premiere
- Date: 4 December 1689
- Place: Theatre Royal, Drury Lane, London

Don Sebastian, King Of Portugal is a 1689 tragedy by the English writer John Dryden. It is based on the reign of King Sebastian of Portugal leading up to his defeat and death at the Battle of Alcácer Quibir in 1578. An Elizabethan play The Battle of Alcazar also portrays the events.

It was first staged by the United Company at the Theatre Royal, Drury Lane. The original cast included Joseph Williams as Don Sebastian, Edward Kynaston as Muley Moluch, Thomas Betterton as Dorax, Samuel Sandford as Benducar, Cave Underhill as Mufti, William Mountfort as Don Antonio, John Bowman as Don Alvarez, Anthony Leigh as Mustapha, Elizabeth Barry as Almeyda, Susanna Mountfort as Morayma and Elinor Leigh as Johayma. It was published in 1690 and dedicated to the politician the Earl of Leicester.

== Bibliography ==
- Van Lennep, W. The London Stage, 1660-1800: Volume One, 1660-1700. Southern Illinois University Press, 1960.
