= The English Frier =

1690 play

- Original language: English
- Written by: John Crowne
- Genre: Restoration Comedy

Premiere
- Date: March 1690
- Place: Theatre Royal, Drury Lane, London

The English Frier; Or, The Town Sparks, sometimes spelt as The English Friar, is a 1690 comedy play by the English writer John Crowne. It was originally staged by the United Company most likely at the Theatre Royal, Drury Lane, although it may have appeared at the Dorset Garden Theatre, the other venue of the company. Written in context of the recent Glorious Revolution, it attacks Catholic priests who meddle in English politics, undermining the constitution.

The original cast included Anthony Leigh as Lord Stately, Edward Kynaston as Lord Wiseman, George Powell as Bellamour, John Bowman as Father Finical, Joseph Williams as Young Ranter, Cave Underhill as Old Ranter, George Bright as Dullman, William Bowen as Coachman, Samuel Sandford as Sir Thomas Credulous, Anne Bracegirdle as Julia, Charlotte Butler as Airy, Elinor Leigh as Lady Pinchgut and Elizabeth Boutell as Lady Credulous.

== Bibliography ==
- Canfield, J. Douglas. Tricksters and Estates: On the Ideology of Restoration Comedy. University Press of Kentucky, 2014.
- Swaminathan, Srividhya & Beach & Adam R. Invoking Slavery in the Eighteenth-Century British Imagination. Routledge, 2016.
- Van Lennep, W. The London Stage, 1660-1800: Volume One, 1660-1700. Southern Illinois University Press, 1960.
