= Sir Anthony Love =

1690 play

- Original language: English
- Written by: Thomas Southerne
- Genre: Restoration Comedy

Premiere
- Date: September 1690
- Place: Theatre Royal, Drury Lane, London

Sir Anthony Love; Or, The Rambling Lady is a 1690 comedy play by the Irish writer Thomas Southerne. It was originally staged by the United Company at the Theatre Royal, Drury Lane with a cast that included Susanna Mountfort in a breeches role as Sir Anthony Love, William Mountfort as Valentine, Joseph Williams as Ilford, William Bowen as Sir Gentle Golding, Anthony Leigh as An Abbe, John Hodgson as Count Canaile, Samuel Sandford as Count Verole, George Bright as Waitwell, Colley Cibber as Servant to Sir Gentle, Charlotte Butler as Floriante, Anne Bracegirdle as Charlote and Frances Maria Knight as Volante. The play's incidental music was composed by Henry Purcell.

== Bibliography ==
- Van Lennep, W. The London Stage, 1660-1800: Volume One, 1660-1700. Southern Illinois University Press, 1960.
