= Restoration comedy =

Theatrical genre rooted in late 17th-century England

Refinement meets burlesque in Restoration comedy. In this scene from George Etherege's Love in a Tub, musicians and well-bred ladies surround a man who is wearing a tub because he has lost his trousers.

Restoration comedy is English theatrical comedy written and performed in the Restoration period of 1660–1710. Comedy of manners is used as a synonym for this. After public stage performances were banned for 18 years by the Puritan regime, reopening of the theatres in 1660 marked a renaissance of English drama. Sexually explicit language was encouraged by King Charles II (1660–1685) personally and by the rakish style of his court. Historian George Norman Clark argues:

The best-known fact about the Restoration drama is that it is immoral. The dramatists did not criticize the accepted morality about gambling, drink, love, and pleasure generally, or try, like the dramatists of our own time, to work out their own view of character and conduct. What they did was, according to their respective inclinations, to mock at all restraints. Some were gross, others delicately improper.... The dramatists did not merely say anything they liked: they also intended to glory in it and to shock those who did not like it.

The socially diverse audiences included aristocrats, their servants and hangers-on and a major middle-class segment. They were attracted to the comedies by up-to-the-minute topical writing, crowded and bustling plots, introduction of the first professional actresses, and the rise of the first celebrity actors. The period saw the first professional female playwright, Aphra Behn.

== Theatre companies ==
=== Original patent companies, 1660–1684 ===
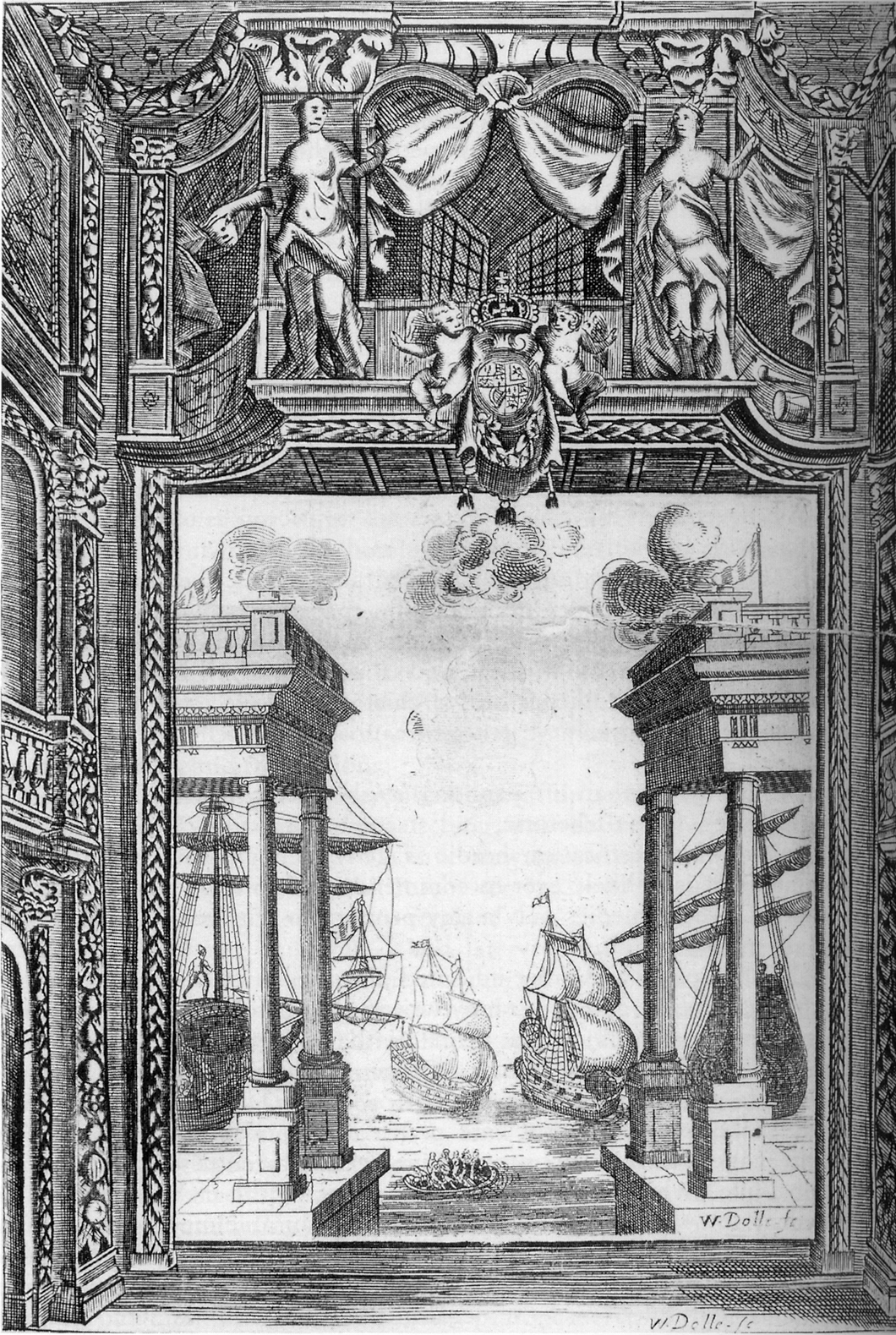
The sumptuously decorated Dorset Gardens playhouse in 1673, with one of the sets for Elkannah Settle's The Empress of Morocco. The apron stage at the front which allowed intimate audience contact is not visible in the picture (the artist is standing on it).

Charles II was an active and interested patron of drama. Soon after his restoration in 1660 he granted exclusive staging rights, so-called Royal patents, to the King's Company and the Duke's Company, led by two middle-aged Caroline playwrights, Thomas Killigrew and William Davenant. The patentees scrambled for performance rights to the previous generation's Jacobean and Caroline plays, as the first necessity for economic survival before any new plays existed.

Their next priority was to build splendid patent theatres in Drury Lane and Dorset Gardens, respectively. Striving to outdo each other, Killigrew and Davenant ended with quite similar theatres, both designed by Christopher Wren, both optimally providing music and dancing, and both fitted with moveable scenery and elaborate machines for thunder, lightning, and waves.

The Restoration dramatists renounced the tradition of satire recently embodied by Ben Jonson, devoting themselves to the comedy of manners.

The audience of the early Restoration period was not exclusively courtly, as has sometimes been supposed, but it was quite small and could barely support two companies. There was no untapped reserve of occasional playgoers. Ten consecutive performances constituted a success. This closed system forced playwrights to respond strongly to popular taste. Fashions in drama changed almost week by week rather than season by season, as each company responded to the offerings of the other, and new plays were urgently sought. In this hectic climate the new genres of heroic drama, pathetic drama and Restoration comedy were born and flourished.

=== United Company, 1682–1695 ===
Both the quantity and quality of drama suffered in 1682 when the more successful Duke's Company absorbed the struggling King's Company to form the United Company. Production of new plays dropped off sharply in the 1680s, affected by the monopoly and the political situation (see Decline of comedy below). The influence and incomes of actors dropped too. In the late 1680s, predatory investors ("adventurers") converged on the United Company. Management was taken over by the lawyer Christopher Rich, who tried to finance a tangle of "farmed" shares and sleeping partners by slashing salaries and dangerously by abolishing traditional perks of senior performers, who were stars with the clout to fight back.

=== War of the theatres, 1695–1700 ===
The company owners, wrote the young United Company employee Colley Cibber, "had made a monopoly of the stage, and consequently presum'd they might impose what conditions they pleased upon their people. [They] did not consider that they were all this while endeavouring to enslave a set of actors whom the public were inclined to support." Performers like the legendary Thomas Betterton, the tragedienne Elizabeth Barry and the rising young comedian Anne Bracegirdle had the audience on their side, and confident of this, walked out.

The actors gained a Royal "licence to perform", so bypassing Rich's ownership of the original Duke's and King's Company patents from 1660 and forming their own cooperative company. This venture was set up with detailed rules for avoiding arbitrary managerial authority, regulating the ten actors' shares, setting the conditions of salaried employees and the sickness and retirement benefits of both categories. In 1695, the cooperative had the good luck to open with the première of William Congreve's famous Love For Love and the skill to make it a huge box-office success.

London again had two competing companies. Their dash to attract audiences briefly revitalised Restoration drama, but also set it on a fatal slope to the lowest common denominator of public taste. Rich's company notoriously offered Bartholomew Fair-type attractions – high kickers, jugglers, rope dancers, and performing animals. The co-operating actors, while appealing to snobbery by setting themselves up as the one legitimate theatre company in London, were not above retaliating with "prologues recited by boys of five and epilogues declaimed by ladies on horseback".

== Actors ==
=== First actresses ===
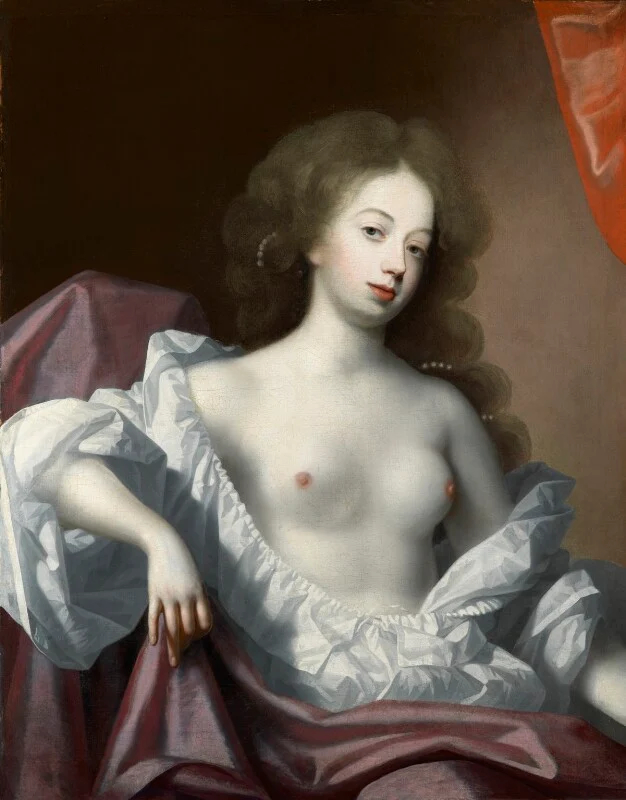
Nell Gwynn was one of the first actresses and the mistress of Charles II.

Restoration comedy was strongly influenced by the first professional actresses. Before the closing of the theatres, all female roles had been taken by boy players. The predominantly male audiences of the 1660s and 1670s were curious, censorious and delighted at the novelty of seeing real women engage in risqué repartee and take part in physical seduction scenes. Samuel Pepys refers many times in his diary to visiting the playhouse to watch or re-watch performances by particular actresses and to his enjoyment of these =).

Daringly suggestive comedy scenes involving women became especially common, although Restoration actresses were, just like male actors, expected to do justice to all kinds and moods of plays. Their role in the development of Restoration tragedy is also important, compare She-tragedy.

A speciality introduced almost as early as actresses was the breeches role – an actress appearing in male clothes, breeches of tight-fitting knee-length pants, the standard male garment of the time. For instance, to play a witty heroine who disguises herself as a boy to hide or to engage in escapades disallowed to girls. A quarter of the plays produced on the London stage between 1660 and 1700 contained breeches roles. Women playing them behaved with the freedom society allowed to men.

Some feminist critics such as Jacqueline Pearson saw them as subverting conventional gender roles and empowering female members of the audience. Elizabeth Howe has objected that the male disguise, when studied in relation to play texts, prologues, and epilogues, comes out as "little more than yet another means of displaying the actress as a sexual object" to male patrons, by showing off her body, normally hidden by a skirt, outlined by the male outfit."

Successful Restoration actresses included Charles II's mistress Nell Gwyn, the tragedienne Elizabeth Barry, famous for an ability to "move the passions" and make whole audiences cry, and the 1690s comedian Anne Bracegirdle. Susanna Mountfort (Susanna Verbruggen), had many roles written specially for her in the 1680s and 1690s. Letters and memoirs of the period show men and women in the audience relishing Mountfort's swaggering, roistering impersonations of young women breeched to enjoy the social and sexual freedom of male Restoration rakes.

=== First celebrity actors ===
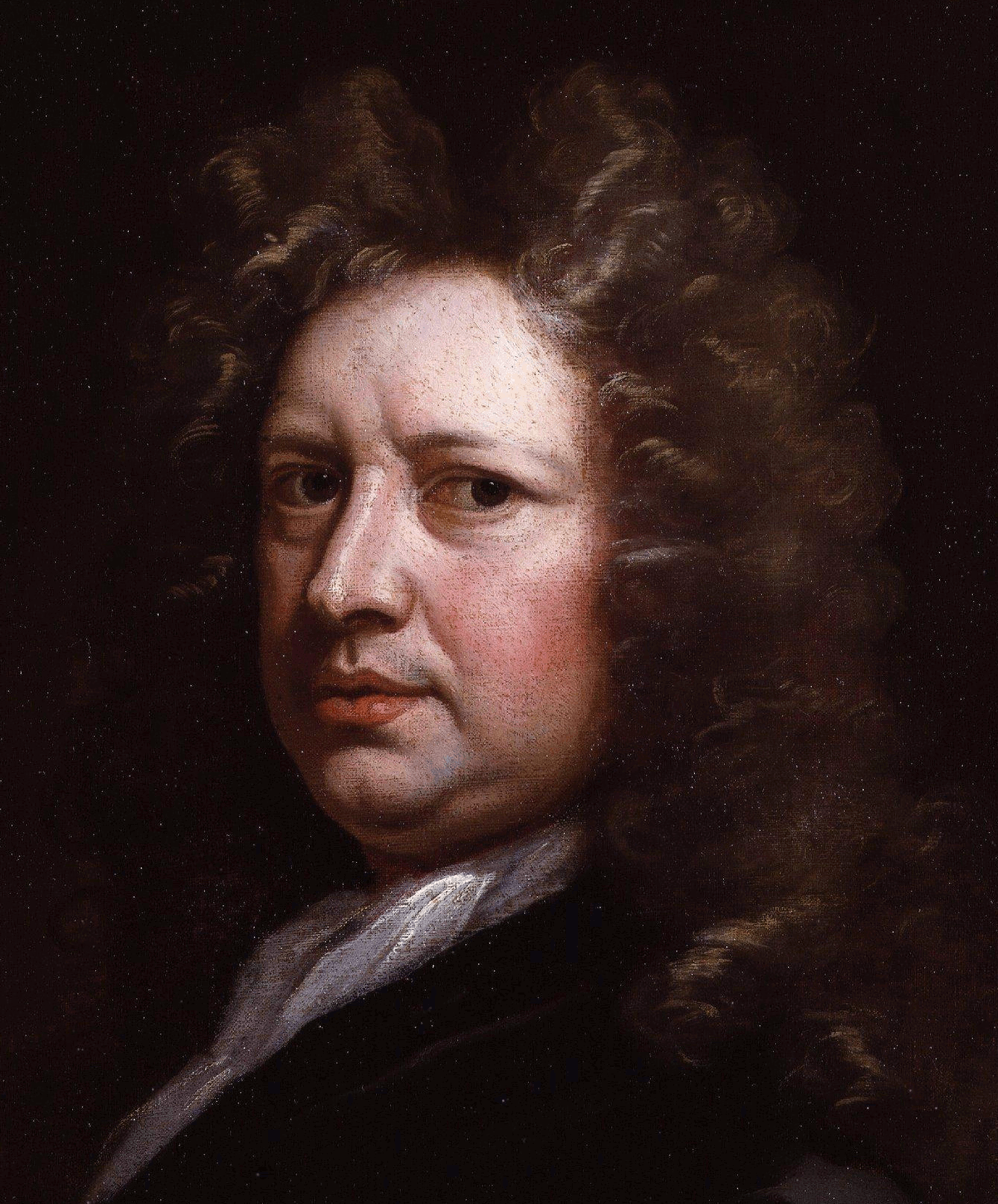
Thomas Betterton played the irresistible Dorimant in George Etherege's Man of Mode. Betterton's acting won praise from Pepys, Alexander Pope, and Colley Cibber.

Male and female actors on the London stage in the Restoration period became for the first time public celebrities. Documents of the period show audiences attracted to performances by the talents of specific actors as much as by specific plays, and more than by authors, who seem to have been the least important draw, no performance being advertised by an author until 1699. Although playhouses were built for large audiences – the second Drury Lane theatre from 1674 held 2,000 patrons – they were compact in design and an actor's charisma could be intimately projected from the thrust stage.

With two companies competing for their services from 1660 to 1682, star actors could negotiate star deals, comprising company shares and benefit nights as well as salaries. This advantage changed when the two companies were amalgamated in 1682. The way the actors rebelled and took command of a new company in 1695 is an illustration of how far their status and power had developed since 1660.

The greatest fixed stars among Restoration actors were Elizabeth Barry ("Famous Mrs Barry" who "forc 'd Tears from the Eyes of her Auditory") and Thomas Betterton, both active in running the actors' revolt in 1695 and both original patent-holders in the resulting actors' cooperative.

Betterton played every great male part there was from 1660 into the 18th century. After watching Hamlet in 1661, Pepys reports in his diary that the young beginner Betterton "did the prince's part beyond imagination." Such expressive performances seem to have attracted playgoers as magnetically, as did the novelty of seeing women on the stage. He was soon established as the leading man in the Duke's Company, and played Dorimant, the seminal irresistible Restoration rake, at the première of George Etherege's Man of Mode (1676).

Betterton's position remained unassailed through the 1680s, both as leading man of the United Company and as its stage manager and de facto day-to-day leader. He remained loyal to Rich longer than many of his co-workers, but eventually he headed an actors' walkout in 1695 and became the acting manager of the new company.

== Comedies ==
Variety and dizzying fashion changes are typical of Restoration comedy. Though the "Restoration drama" unit taught to college students is likely to be telescoped in a way that makes the plays all sound contemporary, scholars now have a strong sense of the rapid evolution of English drama over these 40 years and its social and political causes. The influence of theatre-company competition and playhouse economics is also acknowledged.

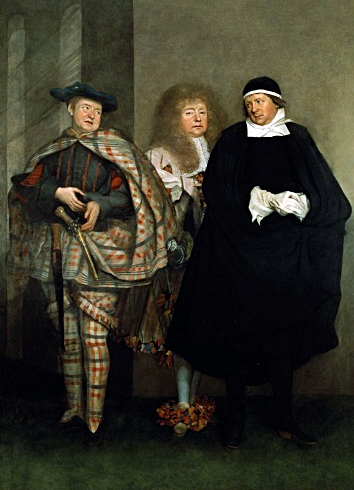
John Lacy was the favourite comic of King Charles II.

Restoration comedy peaked twice. The genre came to marked maturity in the mid-1670s with an extravaganza of aristocratic comedies. Twenty lean years followed this short golden age, though the achievement of Aphra Behn in the 1680s can be noted. In the mid-1690s, a brief second Restoration comedy renaissance arose, aimed at a wider audience. The comedies of the golden 1670s and the 1690s peak times are extremely different from each other.

An attempt is made below to illustrate the generational taste shift by describing The Country Wife (1675) and The Provoked Wife (1697) in some detail. The two plays differ in some typical ways, just as a Hollywood movie of the 1950s differs from one of the 1970s. The plays are not offered as "typical" of their decades. There exist no typical comedies of the 1670s or the 1690s. Even within these two short peak-times, comedy types kept mutating and multiplying.

=== Aristocratic comedy, 1660–1680 ===
The drama of the 1660s and 1670s was vitalised by the competition between the two patent companies created at the Restoration, and by the personal interest of Charles II, while comic playwrights arose to the demand for new plays. They stole freely from the contemporary French and Spanish stage, from English Jacobean and Caroline plays, and even from Greek and Roman classical comedies, combining the looted plotlines in adventurous ways. Resulting differences of tone in a single play were appreciated rather than frowned on: audiences prized "variety" within as well as between plays.

Early Restoration audiences had little enthusiasm for structurally simple, well-shaped comedies such as those of Molière. They demanded bustling, crowded multi-plot action and fast pace. Even a splash of high heroic drama might be thrown in to enrich the comedy mix, as in George Etherege's Love in a Tub (1664), which has one heroic verse "conflict between love and friendship" plot, one urbane wit comedy plot, and one burlesque pantsing plot. (See illustration, top right.) Such incongruities contributed to the low esteem held by Restoration comedy in the 18th, 19th and early 20th centuries. Today, such total theatre experience is again valued on the stage and by postmodern academic critics.

The unsentimental or "hard" comedies of John Dryden, William Wycherley, and George Etherege reflected the atmosphere at Court. They celebrated with frankness an aristocratic macho lifestyle of unremitting sexual intrigue and conquest. The Earl of Rochester, a real-life Restoration rake, courtier and poet, is flatteringly portrayed in Etherege's The Man of Mode (1676) as a riotous, witty, intellectual, sexually irresistible aristocrat, a template for posterity's idea of the glamorous Restoration rake, never actually a very common character in Restoration comedy.

Wycherley's The Plain Dealer (1676), a variation on the theme of Molière's Le Misanthrope, was highly regarded for uncompromising satire. It earned Wycherley the appellation "Plain Dealer" Wycherley or "Manly" Wycherley, after the play's main character Manly. The single play that does most to support the charge of obscenity levelled then and now at Restoration comedy is probably Wycherley's The Country Wife (1675).

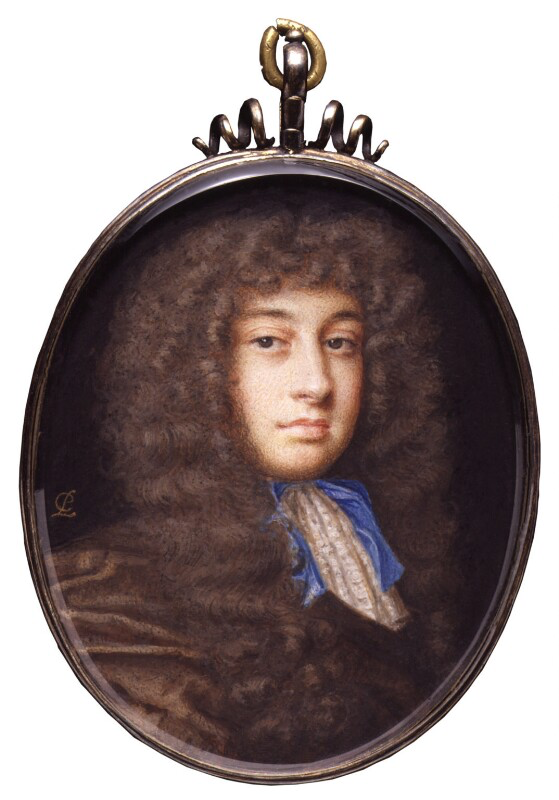
William Wycherley, The Country Wife: "O Lord, I'll have some china too. Good Master Horner, don't think to give other people china, and me none. Come in with me too."

==== Example. William Wycherley, The Country Wife (1675) ====
The Country Wife has three interlinked but distinct plots, which each project sharply different moods:

1. Horner's impotence trick provides the main plot and the organising principle. The upper-class rake Horner mounts a campaign to seduce as many respectable ladies as possible, first spreading a false rumour of his own impotence, so as to be allowed where no other men might go. The trick is a great success and Horner has sex with many married ladies of virtuous reputation, whose husbands are happy to leave them alone with him. In the famously outrageous "China scene", sexual intercourse is assumed to take place repeatedly just off stage, where Horner and his mistresses carry on a sustained double entendre dialogue purportedly about Horner's china collection. The Country Wife is driven by a succession of near-discoveries of the truth about Horner's sexual prowess (and so the truth about the respectable ladies), from which he extricates himself by quick thinking and luck. Horner never reforms, but keeps his secret to the end and is seen to go on merrily reaping the fruits of his planted misinformation past the last act and beyond.

2. The married life of Pinchwife and Margery draws on Molière's School for Wives. Middle-aged Pinchwife has married an ignorant young country girl in the hope that she will not know to cuckold him. Horner teaches her, and Margery cuts a swathe through the sophistications of London marriage without even noticing them. She is enthusiastic about the virile handsomeness of town gallants, rakes, and especially theatre actors (such self-referential stage jokes were nourished by the new higher status of actors), and keeps Pinchwife in a state of continual horror with her plain-spokenness and interest in sex. A running joke is the way Pinchwife's pathological jealousy always leads him into supplying Margery with the very information he wishes her not to have.

3. The courtship of Harcourt and Alithea is a comparatively uplifting love story, in which the witty Harcourt wins the hand of Pinchwife's sister Alithea from the hands of the upper-class town snob Sparkish, to whom she was engaged until discovering he loved her only for her money.

=== Decline of comedy, 1678–1690 ===
When the two companies merged in 1682 and the London stage became a monopoly, both the number and the variety of new plays dropped sharply. There was a swing away from comedy to serious political drama, reflecting preoccupations and divisions after the Popish Plot (1678) and Exclusion Crisis (1682). The few comedies produced tended to be political in focus, the Whig dramatist Thomas Shadwell sparring with the Tories John Dryden and Aphra Behn. Behn's achievement as an early professional woman writer has been the subject of much recent study.

=== Comedy renaissance, 1690–1700 ===
During a second wave of Restoration comedy in the 1690s, the "softer" comedies of William Congreve and John Vanbrugh reflected mutating cultural perceptions and great social change. The playwrights of the 1690s set out to appeal to more socially mixed audiences with a strong middle-class element, and to female spectators, for instance by moving the war between the sexes from the arena of intrigue into that of marriage. The focus in comedy is less on young lovers outwitting the older generation, and more on marital relations after the wedding bells.

Thomas Southerne's dark The Wives' Excuse (1691) is not yet "soft": it shows a woman miserably married to the fop Friendall, everybody's friend, whose follies and indiscretions undermine her social worth, as her honour is bound up in his. Mrs Friendall is pursued by a would-be lover, a matter-of-fact rake devoid of all the qualities that made Etherege's Dorimant charming. She is kept from action and choice by the unattractiveness of all her options. The humour of this "comedy" is in the subsidiary love-chase and fornication plots, none in the main plot.

In Congreve's Love for Love (1695) and The Way of the World (1700), the "wit duels" between lovers typical of 1670s comedy are underplayed. The give-and-take set pieces of couples still testing their attraction for each other have mutated into witty prenuptial debates on the eve of marriage, as in the famous "Proviso" scene in The Way of the World (1700). Vanbrugh's The Provoked Wife (1697) follows in the footsteps of Southerne's Wives' Excuse, with a lighter touch and more humanly recognisable characters.

==== Example. John Vanbrugh, The Provoked Wife (1697) ====
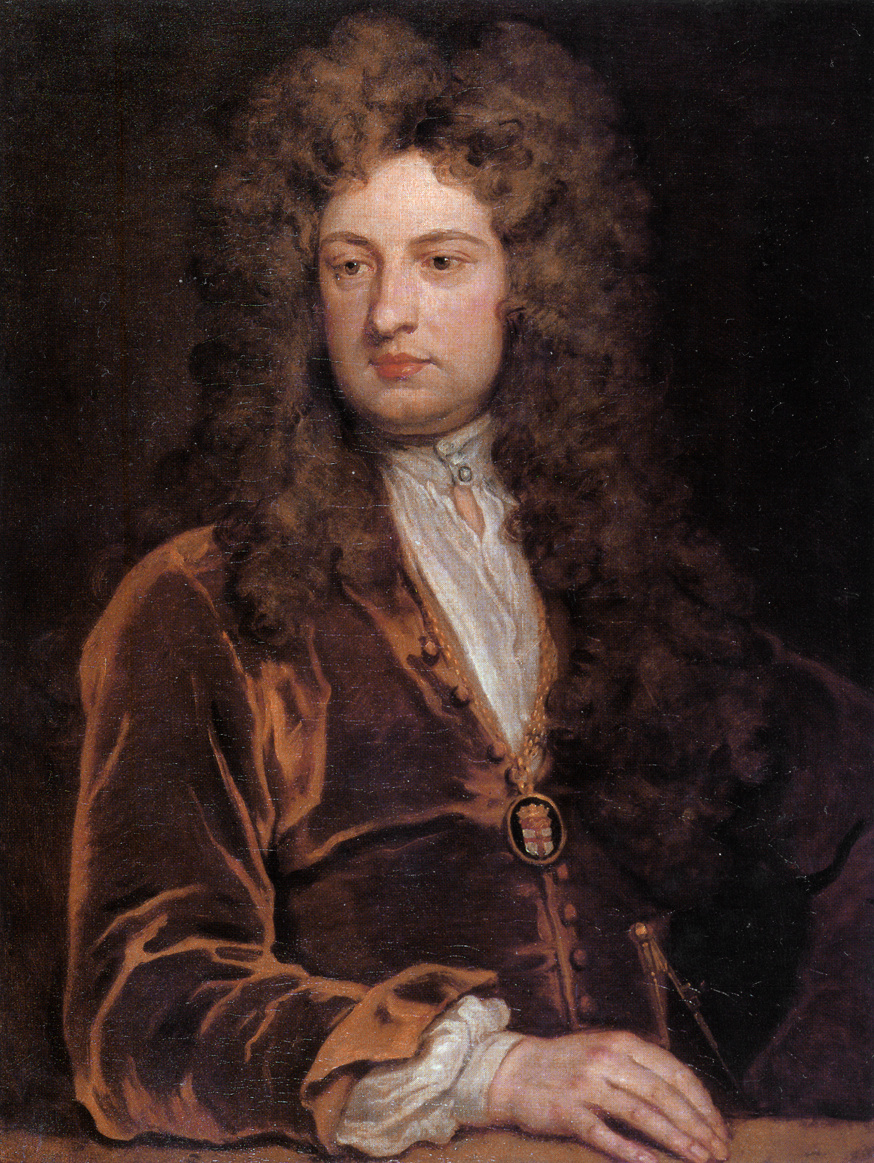
John Vanbrugh, The Provoked Wife: "These are good times. A woman may have a gallant and a separate maintenance too."

The Provoked Wife is something of a Restoration problem play in its attention to the subordinate legal position of married women and the complexities of "divorce" and separation, issues that had been highlighted in the mid-1690s by some notorious cases before the House of Lords (see Stone).

Sir John Brute in The Provoked Wife is tired of matrimony. He comes home drunk every night and is continually rude and insulting to his wife. She is meanwhile tempted to embark on an affair with the witty and faithful Constant. Divorce is no option for either of the Brutes at this time, but forms of legal separation have recently arisen and would entail separate maintenance for the wife. Such an arrangement would prevent remarriage. Still, muses Lady Brute, in one of many discussions with her niece Bellinda, "These are good times. A woman may have a gallant and a separate maintenance too."

Bellinda is meanwhile grumpily courted by Constant's friend Heartfree, who is surprised and dismayed to find himself in love with her. The bad example of the Brutes is a constant warning to Heartfree not to marry.

The Provoked Wife is a talk play, with the focus less on love scenes and more on discussions between friends, female (Lady Brute and Bellinda) and male (Constant and Heartfree). These are full of jokes, but are also thoughtful, with a dimension of melancholy and frustration.

After a forged-letter complication, the play ends with marriage between Heartfree and Bellinda and stalemate between the Brutes. Constant continues to pay court to Lady Brute, and she continues to shilly-shally.

=== End of comedy ===
The tolerance for Restoration comedy even in its modified form was running out by the end of the 17th century, as public opinion turned to respectability and seriousness faster than playwrights did. Interconnected causes for this shift in taste were demographic change, the Glorious Revolution of 1688, William's and Mary's dislike of the theatre, and the lawsuits brought against playwrights by the Society for the Reformation of Manners, founded in 1692.

In 1698, when Jeremy Collier attacked Congreve and Vanbrugh in his Short View of the Immorality and Profaneness of the English Stage, he was confirming a shift in audience taste that had taken place. At the much-anticipated all-star première in 1700 of The Way of the World, Congreve's first comedy for five years, the audience showed only moderate enthusiasm for that subtle and almost melancholy work. The comedy of sex and wit was about to be replaced by the drama of obvious sentiment and exemplary morality.

== After Restoration comedy ==
=== Stage history ===
During the 18th and 19th centuries, the sexual frankness of Restoration comedy ensured that theatre producers cannibalised it or adapted it with a heavy hand, rather than actually performed it. Today Restoration comedy is again appreciated on stage. The classics – Wycherley's The Country Wife and The Plain-Dealer, Etherege's The Man of Mode, and Congreve's Love For Love and The Way of the World – have competition not only from Vanbrugh's The Relapse and The Provoked Wife, but from such dark, unfunny comedies as Thomas Southerne's The Wives Excuse. Aphra Behn, once considered unstageable, has had a renaissance, with The Rover now a repertory favourite.

=== Literary criticism ===
Distaste for sexual impropriety long kept Restoration comedy off the stage, locked in a critical poison cupboard. Victorian critics like William Hazlitt, though valuing the linguistic energy and "strength" of the canonical writers Etherege, Wycherley and Congreve, found it necessary to temper aesthetic praise with heavy moral condemnation. Aphra Behn received the condemnation without the praise, as outspoken sex comedy was seen as particularly offensive from a woman author. At the turn of the 20th century, an embattled minority of academic Restoration comedy enthusiasts began to appear, such as the editor Montague Summers, whose work ensured that plays of Restoration comedy authors remained in print.

"Critics remain astonishingly defensive about the masterpieces of this period," wrote Robert D. Hume as late as 1976. It is only over the last few decades that the statement has become untrue, with Restoration comedy acknowledged as a rewarding subject for high theory analysis, and Wycherley's The Country Wife, long branded the most obscene play in the English language, becoming something of an academic favourite. "Minor" comic writers are getting a fair share of attention, especially the post-Aphra Behn generation of women playwrights around the turn of the 18th century: Delarivier Manley, Mary Pix, Catharine Trotter, and Susanna Centlivre. A broad study of most never-reprinted Restoration comedies has been made possible by internet access (by subscription only) to the first editions at the British Library.

== List of Restoration comedies ==
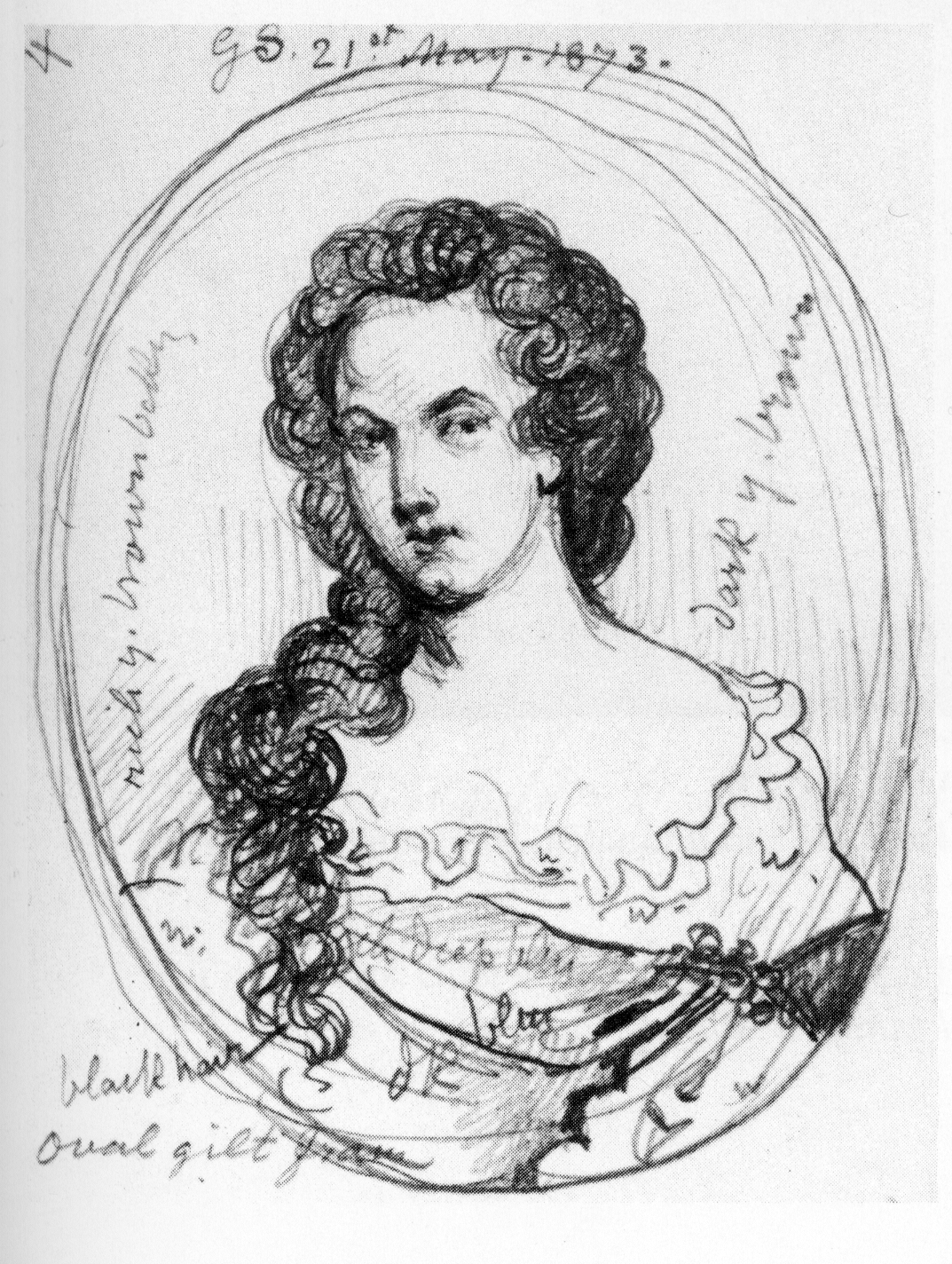
The Rover by Aphra Behn is now a repertory favourite.

- George Etherege – The Comical Revenge (1664), She Would If She Could (1668), The Man of Mode (1676)
- John Dryden – An Evening's Love (1668), Marriage a la Mode (1672)
- Charles Sedley – The Mulberry-Garden (1668), Bellamira: or, The Mistress (1687)
- George Villiers, 2nd Duke of Buckingham – The Rehearsal (1671)
- William Wycherley – Love in a Wood (1671), The Country Wife (1675), The Plain Dealer (1676)
- Thomas Shadwell – Epsom Wells (1672), The Virtuoso (1676), A True Widow (1678), The Woman Captain (1679), The Squire of Alsatia (1688), Bury Fair (1689), The Volunteers (1692)
- Edward Ravenscroft – The Careless Lovers (1673) The London Cuckolds (1681), Dame Dobson (1683), The Canterbury Guests (1694)
- John Crowne – The Country Wit (1676), City Politiques (1683), Sir Courtly Nice (1685), The English Friar (1690), The Married Beau (1694)
- Thomas Rawlins – Tom Essence (1676), Tunbridge Wells (1678)
- Aphra Behn – The Counterfeit Bridegroom (1677), The Rover (1677), The Roundheads (1681), The Revenge (1680), The City Heiress (1682), The Lucky Chance (1686)
- Thomas D'Urfey – A Fond Husband (1677), Squire Oldsapp (1678), The Virtuous Wife (1679), Sir Barnaby Whigg (1681), The Royalist (1682) A Commonwealth of Women (1685), A Fool's Preferment (1688), Love for Money (1691), The Marriage-Hater Matched (1692), The Campaigners (1698)
- Thomas Otway – Friendship in Fashion (1678)
- Thomas Southerne – Sir Anthony Love (1690), The Wives Excuse (1691), The Maid's Last Prayer (1693)
- William Congreve – The Old Bachelor (1693), Love For Love (1695), The Way of the World (1700)
- John Vanbrugh – The Relapse (1696), The Provoked Wife (1697)
- George Farquhar – Love and a Bottle (1698), The Constant Couple (1699), Sir Harry Wildair (1701), The Recruiting Officer (1706), The Beaux' Stratagem (1707)
- Susanna Centlivre – The Perjured Husband (1700), The Gamester (1705), The Busie Body (1709)

== Film adaptations ==
- The Country Wife, starring Helen Mirren (1977)

== See also ==
- Essay of Dramatick Poesie
- John Rich (producer)
- Restoration style
