= Amphitryon (Dryden play) =

Restoration comedy by John Dryden

- Written by: John Dryden
- Original language: English
- Genre: Restoration Comedy

Premiere
- Date premiered: 21 October 1690
- Place premiered: Theatre Royal, Drury Lane, London

Amphitryon is an English language comedy by John Dryden which is based on Molière's 1668 play of the same name which was in turn based on the story of the Greek mythological character Amphitryon as told by Plautus in his play from ca. 190-185 B.C. Dryden's play, which focuses on themes of sexual morality and power, premiered in London in 1690. Notable innovations in Dryden's adaptation compared to previous plays on Amphitryon included music by Henry Purcell and the character of Phaedra, who flirts with Sosia but is eventually won over by Mercury's promises of wealth.

Originally staged at the Theatre Royal, Drury Lane by the United Company the cast included Thomas Betterton as Jupiter, Anthony Leigh as Mercury, John Bowman as Phoebus, Joseph Williams as Amphitryon, James Nokes as Sosia, Samuel Sandford as Gripus, George Bright as Polidas, William Bowen as Tranio, Elizabeth Barry as Alcmena, Susanna Mountfort as Phaedra, Katherine Corey as Bromia and Charlotte Butler as Night.

Although popular with the public, Dryden's play was attacked by Jeremy Collier in his 1698 pamphlet entitled "A Short View of the Immorality and Profaneness of the English Stage" for undermining social mores and attacking the political values of his day. The work was later altered significantly by John Hawkesworth for a production in 1756, with him removing what he considered the morally objectionable material.
