= Baro Urbigerus =

Baro, Baru or Baron Urbigerus was a seventeenth-century writer on natural philosophy and alchemy. He is known for his Aphorismi Urbigerani (1690). This collection of 100 aphorisms claims to set out completely the theory of the alchemical work, the preparation of the Philosopher's Stone. A shorter collection of 31 aphorisms, contained in it, is known as the Circulatum Minus Urbigeranum. This work exists in German and English versions.
