= Thomas d'Urfey =

English writer & playwright (c.1653–1723)

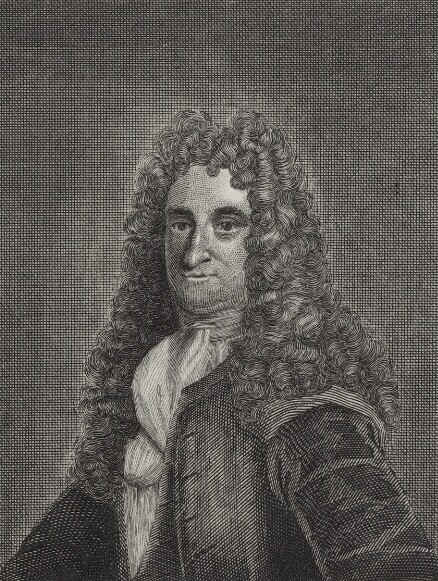
Thomas d'Urfey

Thomas d'Urfey (c. 1653 – 26 February 1723) was an English writer and playwright. He wrote plays, songs, jokes, and poems. He was an important innovator and contributor in the evolution of the ballad opera.

== Life ==
D'Urfey was born in Devonshire and began his professional life as a scrivener, but quickly turned to the theatre. In personality, he was considered so affable and amusing that he could make friends with nearly everyone, including such disparate characters as Charles II of England and his brother James II, and in all layers of society.

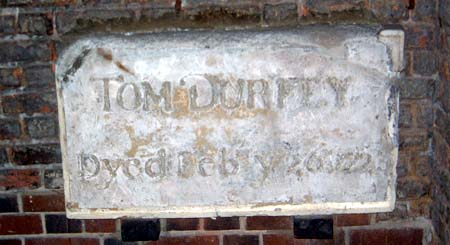
Memorial to Durfey at St James's Church, Piccadilly

D'Urfey lived in an age of self-conscious elitism and anti-egalitarianism, a reaction against the "levelling" tendencies of the previous Puritan reign during the Interregnum. D'Urfey participated in the Restoration's dominant atmosphere of social climbing: he claimed to be of French Huguenot descent, though he might not have been; and he added an apostrophe to the plain English name Durfey when he was in his 30s. He wrote 500 songs, and 32 plays, starting with The Siege of Memphis, or the Ambitious Queen in 1676. This first play was a failure, but he responded in the following year (1677) with a comedy, Madam Fickle, which proved more successful.

His plays include A Fond Husband (1676), The Virtuous Wife (1680), and Wonders in the Sun, or, The Kingdom of the Birds (1706). In 1698 he wrote The Campaigners as a reply and satire of Jeremy Collier's anti-theatrical scourges. When it was performed Mary Lindsey took the part of the nurse although her major contribution was to sing a comedic ballad. His multi-volume Wit and Mirth, or Pills to Purge Melancholy, written between 1698 and 1720, is a collection of songs and ballads. d'Urfey's play The Injured Princess is an adaptation of Shakespeare's Cymbeline. Durfey wrote widely in a witty, satirical vein, usually from a courtly point of view, and his works are a compendium of comedic ideas with brisk, complicated plots carried out in lively dialogue.

His songs, which were often introduced into his plays, generally fell into three types: court songs, political songs (such as "Joy to Great Caesar"), and country songs—the latter tending to be more than a little bawdy. ("The Fart" was one of his hits; The Lusty Young Smith was another.) Over forty different composers set his lyrics to music, including Ed McCurdy and Henry Purcell. Purcell composed music for D'Urfey's play The Comical History of Don Quixote (1694), one of the first dramatisations of Miguel de Cervantes' celebrated novel.

D'Urfey wrote tunes himself as well, although he admitted that they were not very good. Many of the songs' lyrics in Wit and Mirth are preceded by their melodies written in musical notation. He was a friend of the great essayists Joseph Addison and Richard Steele; but, as was not atypical of the time, he also quarreled energetically with other poets and writers. He wrote parodies, and was parodied in return. He stuttered slightly—except, it was said, when he sang or swore. At one point in his career, a jealous rival would respond to D'Urfey's play Love for Money with a parody called Wit for Money, or, Poet Stutterer.

D'Urfey's songs met with royal approval. Addison (in The Guardian) related that he remembered seeing Charles II leaning on Tom d'Urfey's shoulder and humming a song with him. Even William III liked to hear him sing his songs, and as a strong Tory he was sure of the favour of Princess Anne, who is said to have given Tom fifty guineas for a song on the Electress Sophia, then the next heir in succession to the crown.

Although he was poor in his old age, his friends revived A Fond Husband in 1713, with a prologue written by Alexander Pope, which seems to have eased his difficulties.

== Death ==
He was buried on the day of his death at St James's, Piccadilly, in London. His lasting achievement lay in his best songs: 10 of the 68 songs in The Beggar's Opera were by d'Urfey.

== Selected plays ==
- Madam Fickle (1676)
- A Fond Husband (1677)
- Squire Oldsapp (1678)
- Trick for Trick (1678)
- The Virtuous Wife (1679)
- Sir Barnaby Whigg (1681)
- The Royalist (1682)
- A Commonwealth of Women (1685)
- The Banditti (1686)
- A Fool's Preferment (1688)
- Love for Money, or, The Boarding School (1691)
- Bussy D'Ambois (1691)
- The Marriage-Hater Matched (1692)
- The Richmond Heiress (1693)
- The Intrigues at Versailles: Or, A Jilt in All Humours: A Comedy (1697)
- The Campaigners (1698)
- The Bath (1701)
- The Old Mode and the New (1703)
