= Thomas Southerne =

Irish dramatist (1660–1746)

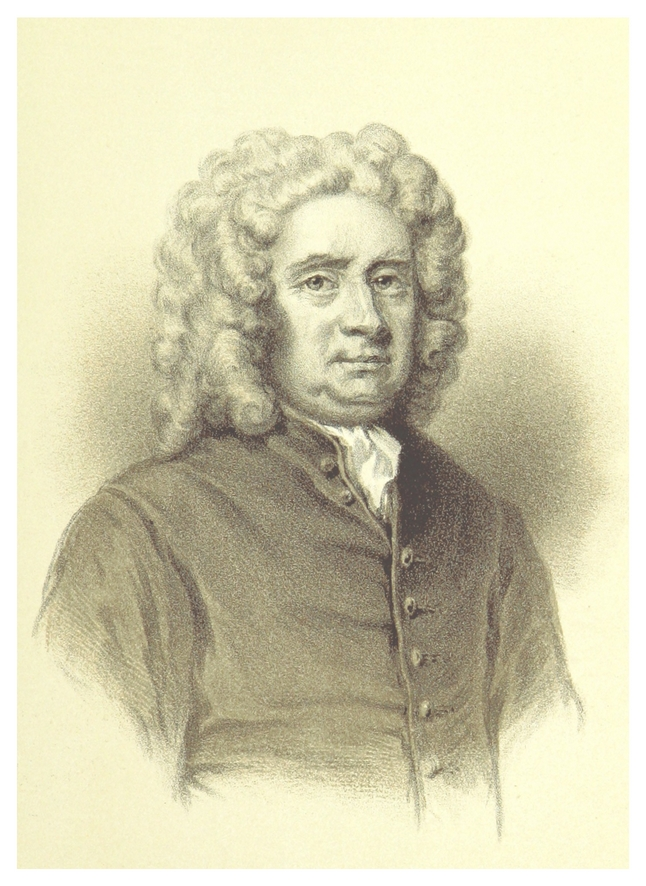
- Born: 12 February 1660; Oxmantown, near Dublin, Ireland
- Died: 26 May 1746 (aged 86)
- Occupation: Dramatist

Thomas Southerne (12 February 1660 – 26 May 1746) was an Irish dramatist.

== Biography ==
Thomas Southerne, born on 12 February 1660, in Oxmantown, near Dublin, was an Irish dramatist. He was the son of Francis Southerne (a Dublin brewer) and Margaret Southerne. He had one daughter, Agnes, of whom the mother is unknown.

He attended Trinity College, Dublin, in 1676 for two years. In 1680, he began attending Middle Temple, London, to study law but was drawn away by his interest for theater. By 1682 he was greatly influenced by John Dryden and produced his first play, The Loyal Brother, which was performed at the Theatre Royal, Drury Lane by the King's Company. Southerne bought his prologue and epilogue from Dryden, who made extra income from his ability to turn such pieces. Despite his friendship with the new playwright, Dryden raised his prices for Southerne". In 1684, Southerne produced his second play, The Disappointment, or, The Mother in Fashion (Kaufman). However, in 1685 Southerne enlisted as an ensign in Princess Anne's Regiment of the Duke of Berwick's Foot. He rapidly rose to the rank of captain, but his military career came to an end in 1688 at the Glorious Revolution.

The plays Southerne had written before he withdrew from the army would see the light of day, for he returned to theater. On his return, he took on a new form of genre for his writing, "he turned from political allegory to comedy". In 1690 "Southerne made his first financial profit from his work". In 1691 he encounters failure with his play, The Wives Excuse, or, Cuckolds Make Themselves which was produced by Dury Lane. Thus failure would not stop Southerne, and so in 1693 he wrote another comedy, The Maid's Last Prayer, or, Any Rather Than Fail which was a success. In 1692 he was blessed with the opportunity by finishing Dryden's tragedy, Cleomenes. In February 1694 he created the tragicomedy The Fatal Marriage which was a huge success and resulted in him being established as a tragic dramatist.

By 1688, "his subject once again ends up in a novel by his colleague Aphra Behn, Oroonoko, or The Royal Slave was performed as a play and was a huge success". According to Kaufman, "At the age of sixty-seven Southerne offers one last play, Money The Mistress in 1726, it is a weak conclusion to an honorable career." He was honored as a playwright. On 26 May 1746, at the age of eighty-seven Southerne died. According to Kaufman, "He was a successful man of the theater, a working playwright for forty-four years." His best plays, The Wives Excuse, The Fatal Marriage and Oroonoko, reveal a competent, indeed interesting, playwright.

Southerne experimented in a variety of dramatic forms. His contemporaries valued him for his ability to portray intensely emotional scenes and for his "pure" language. He worked in the tradition of Otway, and his tragedies point the way to his successor, Nicholas Rowe. In comedy his subject is the distressed wife, and here he offered a pattern for such playwrights as Vanbrugh, Cibber, Congreve, and Farquhar. Today readers are interested in his psychological realism, his portraits of complex characters, often women in the throes of domestic distress, and his coldly realistic, often harsh, analysis of corrupt societal relations".

== Oroonoko ==
Thomas Southerne also wrote the play Oroonoko. Southerne's play was staged in 1695 and published in 1696, with a foreword in which Southerne expresses his gratitude to Behn and praises her work. One of the major changes that Southerne made to his play from Behn's version was that he turned Imoinda's skin color from black to white. "She becomes the invisible and reconstructed black female subject in the America's cultural discourse". Southerne plays with the idea of a double plot: one path that deals with the tragic fates of the newly interracial African lovers and the other on Charlotte's comical take on finding rich husbands for herself and her sister. Through his double plot, Southerne had hoped to illuminate a "twinned relationship between white women's social representation and black women's invisibility and lose of agency under colonialism's raced visual regimes" (MacDonald). At one point, he puts Imonida in a heroic situation where she drives the governor off with her sword when he tried to rape her. In Southerne's play, she fights beside her man during the rebellion with her bow and arrow. She also was the one who used her words to persuade Oroonoko to kill them both and vindicate the honor and the innocence of their love. She was the one who helped guide his knife into her body. Southerne does not speak of the advantages of a white womanhood like most novels during colonialism, but speaks of the unfairness and the treatment of the slaves no matter the color of their skin or gender.

According to T. J. Cribb, Behn mentions that Oroonoko experiences some conflict between his devotion to Imoinda, and his need to rebel, which gives Southerne an opportunity to build Oroonoko's character on this conflict, making it a source of the play's actions. Behn ends the novel with the brutal death of Oroonoko, but the play written by Southerne ends with the "love death" with Imoinda fulfilling his pact with her. Southerne also emphasizes Oroonoko's honor and writes about how Oroonoko gave a speech on justifying slavery in terms of private property and civil contract. Oroonoko speaks of how their owners have paid for them and now they are a part of their estate and they may not like it, but they are no longer individuals, but pieces of property. Southerne expands the idea that even though the harsh treatments, Oroonoko is willing to come to terms with his situation and make it work.

== Other plays ==
Thomas Southern's first play, The Persian Prince, or the Loyal Brother (1682), was based on a contemporary novel. The real interest of the play lay not in the plot, but in the political significance of the personages. Tachmas, the loyal brother, is obviously a flattering portrait of James II, and the villain Ismael is generally taken to represent Shaftesbury.

After leaving his regiment in 1688 he gave himself up entirely to dramatic writing. In 1692 he revised and completed Cleomenes for John Dryden; and two years later he scored a great success in the sentimental drama of The Fatal Marriage, or the Innocent Adultery (1694). The piece is based on Aphra Behn's The History of the Nun, with the addition of a comic underplot. It was frequently revived, and in 1757 was altered by David Garrick and produced at Drury Lane. It was known later as Isabella, or The Fatal Marriage.

The Fatal Marriage is yet another play based on the story of a woman. Like many of his other plays, this too was considered a comedy. Isabella wishes to mourn her lost husband. Isabella finds herself feeling lonely and an outcast from the rest of society. Living in this relatively new world without her husband, Isabella finds herself raped and taken of her innocence by an admirable man in the play who goes by Villeroy. Southerne uses character techniques within Villeroy to display the once innocence of Isabella which enhanced the theme of the play. Southerne was admired for his character technique and was skilled at creating realistic characters and enhancing other characters with the use of newly created personalities. The play was considered to be a tragedy and a serious topic of that time period. Due to the intense tragedy in the play, it became a rather big hit on the stage in which many actresses fought to play the lead role of Isabella and was soon translated from a multitude of languages to be presented on many stages around the world.

According to the Encyclopædia Britannica Eleventh Edition, "[t]he general spirit of his comedies is well exemplified by a line from Sir Anthony Love (1691) "every day a new mistress and a new quarrel." This comedy, in which the part of the heroine, disguised as Sir Anthony Love, was excellently played by Mrs Mountfort, was his best. He scored another conspicuous success in Oroonoko, or The Royal Slave (1696). For the plot of this he was again indebted to the novel by [Aphra] Behn."

== Later works ==
The Wives' Excuse (1669) was a play Southerne wrote in the late 1660s. a comedy that focused on the idea of a woman trapped in an unhealthy marriage. It was one of its kind in that time period and dramatized a serious, intelligent woman living in a corrupt and unethical society. During this time, divorce was a difficult issue to overcome and go through with. The woman, Mrs.Friendall was dismissed by her husband and later resulted in a liking for her suitor. Overall, the play touches up on the subject of inequality in terms of men in relation to women. At the end of the play, although Mrs. Friendall acted with great dignity after being brought down frequently, she remains stuck in her unwanted marriage while the men in the play seem unaffected by any of the circumstances. As so, The Wives' Excuse did not get too many likings by the public as it seemed like the play may have been too foolish for such a serious topic and was dismissed as stupid and thoughtless.

The Maid's Last Prayer was yet another unliked piece by society as it was considered too harsh of a subject for the people living in the mid to late 1690s, although it was unliked, it was not necessarily a lack of success. Often in Thomas Southerne's plays he depicted woman as greedy, selfish, and likely to commit sin. In this piece, a notable character Lady Trickett is considered to be a dirty, sinful woman unworthy of marriage. The play focuses on women such as Lady Trickett being rejected by a seemingly male-dominated society. As so, the message is clear in the play as it is for that time period, women who were sinful and simply not pure were not worthy of marriage and a happy life.

Southerne's later pieces did not achieve any great successes, but he contrived to gain better returns from his plays than Dryden did, and he remained a favourite with his contemporaries and with the next literary generation. He died on 26 May 1746.

His other plays were: The Disappointment, or the Mother in Fashion (1684), founded in part on the Curioso Imperlinente in Don Quixote; The Wives Excuse (1691), or Cuckolds make themselves (1692); The Maids Last Prayer; or Any rather than fail (1692); The Fate of Capua (1700); The Spartan Dame (1719), taken from Plutarch's Life of Aegis; and Money the Mistress (1726).

His work was collected as Plays written by Thomas Southerne, with an Account of the Life and Writings of the Author (1774).

A Compendium of Irish Biography (1878) described him as:

"frugal and pushing; he was peculiarly fortunate in the sale of his plays; and his judicious flattery of the Duke of York considerably advanced his interests. During the Duke of Monmouth's rebellion Southern served in the army. He is described as having been in his latter days "a quiet and venerable old gentleman, who lived near Covent Garden, and frequented the evening prayers there, always neat and decently dressed, commonly in black, with his silver sword and silver locks." "He died (the oldest and richest of the dramatic brotherhood), 26th May 1746, aged 85. Two of his plays, all that are now known to the public, are thus commented on by Hallam: "Southern's Discovery, latterly represented under the name of Isabella, is almost as familiar to the lovers of our theater as Venice Preserved itself; and for the same reason, that whenever an actress of great tragic powers arises, the part of 'Isabella' is as fitted to exhibit them as that of 'Belvidera.' The choice and conduct of the story are, however, Southern's chief merits; for there is little vigour in the language, though it is natural and free from the usual faults of his age. A similar character may be given to his other tragedy, Oroonoko, in which Southern deserves the praise of having first of any English writer, denounced the traffic in slaves and the cruelties of their West Indian bondage. The moral feeling is high in this tragedy, and it has sometimes been acted with a certain success; but the execution is not that of a superior dramatist."

== Sources ==
- ; Restoration and Eighteenth-Century Dramatists: First Series. Ed. Paula R. Backscheider. Dictionary of Literary Biography Vol. 80. Detroit: Gale, 1989. From Literature Resource Center.
- ; Cribb, T. J. "Oroonoko." Research in African Literatures, vol. 31, no. 1, 2000, p. 173. Academic OneFile, link.galegroup.com/apps/doc/A59410546/AONE?u=nysl_se_sojotru&sid=AONE&xid=f8393e79. Accessed 29 Nov. 2017.
- ; Hume, Robert D. "The Works of Thomas Southerne." Modern Philology, vol. 87, no. 3, 1990, p. 276+. Academic OneFile, . Accessed 16 Nov. 2017.
- Kaufman, Anthony. "Thomas Southerne". Restoration and Eighteenth-Century Dramatists: First Series, edited by Paula R. Backscheider, Gale, 1989. Dictionary of Literary Biography Vol. 80. Literature Resource Center.
- MacDonald, Joyce Green. "Race, Women, and the Sentimental in Thomas Southerne's Oroonoko". Criticism, vol. 40, no. 4, 1998, p. 555. Academic OneFile, link.galegroup.com/apps/doc/A53935167/AONE?u=nysl_se_sojotru&sid=AONE&xid=3a299e7e. Accessed 29 November 2017.
- “Thomas Southerne.” Westminster Abbey, www.westminster-abbey.org/abbey-commemorations/commemorations/thomas-southerne/. Accessed 30 Nov. 2024.
