= Philip Griffin =

English actor

Philip Griffin was an English stage actor of the seventeenth century and early eighteenth century. He joined the King's Company at Drury Lane during the 1670s, and was later a member of the merged United Company from 1685. He was named as a manager at Drury Lane in 1695, but then took military service and was styled as Captain Griffin. In 1699 he went to act in Dublin as part of Joseph Ashbury's company at the Smock Alley Theatre, but was back in London where he acted until retired from the stage in 1707.

== Selected roles ==
- Sanchez in The Spanish Rogue by Thomas Duffett (1673)
- Laula in The Empress of Morocco by Thomas Duffett (1673)
- Caligula's Ghost in Nero by Nathaniel Lee (1674)
- Menander in Sophonisba by Nathaniel Lee (1675)
- Grimani in Love in the Dark by Francis Fane (1675)
- Mecaenas in Gloriana by Nathaniel Lee (1676)
- Vernish in The Plain Dealer by William Wycherley (1676)
- Rash in The Country Innocence by John Leanerd (1677)
- Lysimachus in The Rival Queens by Nathaniel Lee (1677)
- Scaramouch in Scaramouch by Edward Ravenscroft (1677)
- Durzo in King Edgar and Alfreda by Edward Ravenscroft (1677)
- Serapion in All for Love by John Dryden (1677)
- Archelaus in Mithridates, King of Pontus by Nathaniel Lee (1677)
- Bowser in The Man of Newmarket by Edward Howard (1678)
- Valentine in Trick for Trick by Thomas D'Urfey (1678)
- Earl of Southampton in The Unhappy Favourite by John Banks (1681)
- Porpuss in Sir Barnaby Whigg by Thomas D'Urfey (1681)
- Arbanes in The Loyal Brother by Thomas Southerne (1682)
- Albuzeiden in The Heir of Morocco by Elkanah Settle (1682)
- Dalmatius in Constantine the Great by Nathaniel Lee (1683)
- Surly in Sir Courtly Nice by John Crowne (1685)
- Du Pier in A Commonwealth of Women by Thomas D'Urfey (1685)
- Sir Richard Lovemore in The Devil of a Wife by Thomas Jevon (1686)
- Leon in The Banditti by Thomas D'Urfey (1686)
- Ghinotto in The Injured Lovers by William Mountfort (1688)
- Sir Edward Belfond in The Squire of Alsatia by Thomas Shadwell (1688)
- Gonzalvo in The Generous Conqueror by Bevil Higgons (1701)
- Love Lovechace in The Bath by Thomas D'Urfey (1701)
- Ulysses in The Virgin Prophetess by Elkanah Settle (1701)
- Duke of Brittanie in The Unhappy Penitent by Catharine Trotter (1701)
- Don Felix in The False Friend by John Vanbrugh (1702)
- Rimini in The Patriot by Charles Gildon (1702)
- Old Bookwit in The Lying Lover by Richard Steele (1703)
- Osmin in The Faithful Bride of Granada by William Taverner (1704)

== Bibliography ==
- Highfill, Philip H, Burnim, Kalman A. & Langhans, Edward A. A Biographical Dictionary of Actors, Actresses, Musicians, Dancers, Managers, and Other Stage Personnel in London, 1660–1800: Garrick to Gyngell. SIU Press, 1978.
- Kozar, Richard & Burling, William J. Summer Theatre in London, 1661–1820, and the Rise of the Haymarket Theatre. Fairleigh Dickinson Univ Press, 2000.
- Van Lennep, W. The London Stage, 1660–1800: Volume One, 1660–1700. Southern Illinois University Press, 1960.
