= Thomas Clark (actor) =

English actor

Thomas Clark was an English stage actor of the seventeenth century. He was a long-standing member of the King's Company, based at the Theatre Royal, Drury Lane in London, from 1670 onwards. He was part of the group of actors who briefly left for Edinburgh in 1679 after a dispute with the management of the company.

== Selected roles ==
- Drusillus in Nero by Nathaniel Lee (1674)
- Massina in Sophonisba by Nathaniel Lee (1675)
- Novell in The Plain Dealer by William Wycherley (1675)
- Mother Woossat in Psyche Debauched by Thomas Duffett (1675)
- Ovid in Gloriana by Nathaniel Lee (1676)
- Hephestion in The Rival Queens by Nathaniel Lee (1677)
- Dollabella in All for Love by John Dryden (1677)
- Aldernold in King Edgar and Alfreda by Edward Ravenscroft (1677)
- Swiftspur in The Man of Newmarket by Edward Howard (1678)
- Franck in Trick for Trick by Thomas D'Urfey (1678)
- Aquilius in Mithridates, King of Pontus by Nathaniel Lee (1678)
- Wilding in Sir Barnaby Whigg by Thomas D'Urfey (1681)
- Earl of Essex in The Unhappy Favourite by John Banks (1681)
- Gayland in The Heir of Morocco by Elkanah Settle (1682)
- Tachmas in The Loyal Brother by Thomas Southerne (1682)

== Bibliography ==
- Highfill, Philip H, Burnim, Kalman A. & Langhans, Edward A. A Biographical Dictionary of Actors, Actresses, Musicians, Dancers, Managers & Other Stage Personnel in London, 1660–1800:Cabanel to Cory. SIU Press, 1973.
- Van Lennep, W. The London Stage, 1660–1800: Volume One, 1660–1700. Southern Illinois University Press, 1960.
- Wilson, John Harold. Mr. Goodman the Player. University of Pittsburgh Press, 1964.
