= John Wiltshire (English actor) =

English actor

John Wiltshire was an English stage actor of the Restoration Era. He joined the King's Company in 1675, before transferring to the rival Duke's Company in 1679 possibly as a replacement for Matthew Medbourne who was arrested in the Popish Plot and subsequently died in Newgate. From 1682 until his death he was part of the merged United Company. According to the autobiography of Colley Cibber he subsequently joined the English Army as captain and was killed in action fighting with William III's forces in Flanders during the Nine Years' War. His surname is also sometimes spelled as Wilshire.

== Selected roles ==
- Justice Crabb in Psyche Debauched by Thomas Duffet (1675)
- Plush in The Country Innocence by John Leanerd (1677)
- Thessalus in The Rival Queens by Nathaniel Lee (1677)
- Oswold in King Edgar and Alfreda by Edward Ravenscroft (1677)
- Another Roman Officer in Mithridates, King of Pontus by Nathaniel Lee (1678)
- Sir Generall Amorous in The Rambling Justice by John Leanerd (1678)
- Passal in The Man of Newmarket by Edward Howard (1678)
- Young Clifford in The Misery of Civil War by John Crowne (1680)
- Paulino in The Orphan by Thomas Otway (1680)
- Lucius in Theodosius by Nathaniel Lee (1680)
- Alphonso in The Spanish Fryar by John Dryden (1680)
- Collatinus in Lucius Junius Brutus by Nathaniel Lee (1680)
- Loveday in The London Cuckolds by Edward Ravenscroft (1681)
- Antonio in The False Count by Aphra Behn (1681)
- Renault in Venice Preserv'd by Thomas Otway (1682)
- Friendly in Mr. Turbulent by Anonymous (1682)
- Cardinal in The Duke Of Guise by John Dryden (1682)
- Gerrard in Dame Dobson by Edward Ravenscroft (1683)
- Lycinius in Constantine the Great by Nathaniel Lee (1683)
- Oliver in A Jovial Crew by Richard Brome (1683)
- Alberto in The Disappointment by Thomas Southerne (1684)
- Lavinio in A Duke and No Duke by Nahum Tate (1684)

== Bibliography ==
- Highfill, Philip H, Burnim, Kalman A. & Langhans, Edward A. A Biographical Dictionary of Actors, Actresses, Musicians, Dancers, Managers & Other Stage Personnel in London, 1660-1800: W. West to Zwingman. SIU Press, 1993.
- Hughes, Derek. The Theatre of Aphra Behn. Springer, 2000.
- Wilson, John Harold. Mr. Goodman the Player. University of Pittsburgh Press, 1964.
