= Robert Shatterell =

English actor (1616–1684)

Robert Shatterell (baptized 10 November 1616 – 1684) was an English actor of the seventeenth century. He was one of the limited group of actors who began their careers in the final period of English Renaissance theatre, and resumed stage work in the Restoration, after the long theatre closure of the English Civil War and the Interregnum, 1642–1660. [See: Richard Baxter; Nicholas Burt; Walter Clun; Charles Hart; Michael Mohun; William Wintershall.]

== Biography ==
Robert Shatterell was baptised on 10 November 1616 in the parish of St. Botolph, Aldgate. He started as a boy player; he was with Beeston's Boys in 1639. During the Civil War, like fellow actors Hart and Burt, he served as an officer in the elite cavalry regiment commanded by Prince Rupert. Shatterell he may have seen combat in the battles of Naseby and Marston Moor, and perhaps at Edgehill as well.

Once the main combat of the Civil War had ended, Shatterell returned to the stage. He was one of the English actors who were active on the Continent, primarily in The Hague and Paris, in the mid-1640s.

After dramatic activity recommenced in England in 1660, Shatterell became one of the thirteen actors who were original sharers in the new-organized King's Company. During his ensuing career, he played mostly comic roles; he took the parts of Poins in Shakespeare's Henry IV plays, Voltore in Jonson's Volpone, and Maskal in Dryden's An Evening's Love, plus Bessus in A King and No King and Calianax in The Maid's Tragedy, both plays by Beaumont and Fletcher, and the Quack in Wycherly's The Country Wife.

== Family ==
Robert Shatterell's younger brother Edward Shatterell (1620 – c. 1664) was also an actor, though less successful and more obscure.
