= Marmaduke Watson =

English actor

Marmaduke Watson was an English stage actor of the seventeenth century. Part of the King's Company based at the Theatre Royal, Drury Lane, he was one of the actors who sided with Charles Killigrew during a dispute in the company in 1677. In 1682 when the United Company was formed he left and went to Dublin to join the Smock Alley Theatre. He later returned to London where his final known performances were with Thomas Betterton's company at the Lincoln's Inn Fields Theatre.

== Selected roles ==
- Bakam in The Island Princess by John Fletcher (1668)
- Hamet in The Conquest of Granada by John Dryden (1670)
- Hostilius in The Roman Empress by William Joyner (1670)
- Eubulus in Marriage à la mode by John Dryden (1673)
- Don Manuel in The Spanish Rogue by Thomas Duffett (1673)
- Captain Middleton in Amboyna by John Dryden (1673)
- Silvius in Nero by Nathaniel Lee (1674)
- Montanto in Othello by William Shakespeare (1675)
- Swordsman in A King and No King by John Fletcher (1675)
- Maherbal in Sophonisba by Nathaniel Lee (1675)
- Arratur in Wits Led By the Nose by William Chamberlayne (1677)
- Old Thrashard in The Country Innocence by John Leanerd (1677)
- Eumenes in The Rival Queens by Nathaniel Lee (1677)
- Physician in Trick for Trick by Thomas D'Urfey (1678)
- Fidalbo in The Italian Husband by Edward Ravenscroft (1697)
- Strechwell in The Deceiver Deceived by Mary Pix (1697)

== Bibliography ==
- Highfill, Philip H, Burnim, Kalman A. & Langhans, Edward A. A Biographical Dictionary of Actors, Actresses, Musicians, Dancers, Managers & Other Stage Personnel in London, 1660–1800, Volume 15. SIU Press, 1993.
- Nicoll, Allardyce. A History of English Drama 1660–1900. Volume I. Cambridge University Press, 2009.
- Van Lennep, W. The London Stage, 1660–1800: Volume One, 1660–1700. Southern Illinois University Press, 1960.
- Wilson, John Harold. Mr. Goodman the Player. University of Pittsburgh Press, 1964.
