= Mary Corbett =

English actress

Mary Corbett was an English stage actress of the seventeenth century. She was a member of the King's Company, based at the Theatre Royal, Drury Lane. She appears to have left the company around the time of the merger creating the new United Company. Her name is sometimes written as Mary Corbet.

== Selected roles ==
- Mrs Dainty Fidget in The Country Wife by William Wycherley (1675)
- King Andrew in Psyche Debauched by Thomas Duffet (1675)
- Melesinda in Aureng-zebe by John Dryden (1675)
- Narcissa in Gloriana by Nathaniel Lee (1676)
- Clevly in The Man of Newmarket by Edward Howard (1678)
- Monima in Mithridates, King of Pontus by Nathaniel Lee (1678)
- Sabina in Trick for Trick by Thomas D'Urfey (1678)
- Gratiana in Sir Barnaby Whigg by Thomas D'Urfey (1681)
- Countess of Nottingham in The Unhappy Favourite by John Banks (1681)

== Bibliography ==
- Highfill, Philip H, Burnim, Kalman A. & Langhans, Edward A. A Biographical Dictionary of Actors, Actresses, Musicians, Dancers, Managers & Other Stage Personnel in London, 1660–1800:. SIU Press, 1982.
- Lanier, Henry Wysham. The First English Actresses: From the Initial Appearance of Women on the Stage in 1660 Till 1700. The Players, 1930.
- Van Lennep, W. The London Stage, 1660–1800: Volume One, 1660–1700. Southern Illinois University Press, 1960.
