= Martin Powell (actor) =

English actor

Martin Powell was an English stage actor of the seventeenth century. Powell was a member of the King's Company from 1669 onwards at the Theatre Royal, Drury Lane in London. He was one of several actors who briefly left for Scotland in 1678 after a dispute with the management, before returning to Drury Lane. In 1682 he joined the merged United Company. Billed throughout his career as Mr. Powell, some of his later appearances can be confused with those of his son George Powell.

In 1675 along with John Coysh he appeared in a private production of John Dryden's The Indian Emperour staged by the Duchess of Portsmouth and an otherwise amateur cast.

== Selected roles ==
- Gomel in The Conquest of Granada by John Dryden (1670)
- Larasco in The Spanish Rogue by Thomas Duffet (1673)
- Furfante in The Amorous Old Woman by Thomas Duffett (1674)
- Mirmilon in Nero by Nathaniel Lee (1674)
- Proveditor in Love in the Dark by Francis Fane (1675)
- Costard in Psyche Debauched by Thomas Duffet (1675)
- Leander in Gloriana by Nathaniel Lee (1676)
- Mr William in The Country Innocence by John Leanerd (1677)
- Philip in The Rival Queens by Nathaniel Lee (1677)
- Vanlore in Wits Led by the Nose by William Chamberlayne (1677)
- Sir Arthur Twilight in The Rambling Justice by John Leanerd (1678)
- Andravar in Mithridates, King of Pontus by Nathaniel Lee (1678)
- Nonsuch in The Man of Newmarket by Edward Howard (1678)
- Sir Peregreen in Trick for Trick by Thomas D'Urfey (1678)
- Whigg in Sir Barnaby Whigg by Thomas D'Urfey (1681)
- Trebellius in Sophonisba by Nathaniel Lee (1681)
- Bakam in The Island Princess by Nahum Tate (1687)
- Usher in A Fool's Preferment by Thomas D'Urfey (1688)
- Attorney in The Squire of Alsatia by Thomas Shadwell (1688)

== Bibliography ==
- Highfill, Philip H, Burnim, Kalman A. & Langhans, Edward A. A Biographical Dictionary of Actors, Actresses, Musicians, Dancers, Managers & Other Stage Personnel in London, 1660–1800: Volume 12. SIU Press, 1973.
- Walking, Andrew R. Masque and Opera in England, 1656–1688. Taylor & Francis, 2016.
- Wilson, John Harold. Mr. Goodman the Player. University of Pittsburgh Press, 1964.
