= King Edgar and Alfreda =

1677 play

- Original language: English
- Written by: Edward Ravenscroft
- Genre: Tragedy

Premiere
- Date: October 1677
- Place: Theatre Royal, Drury Lane, London

King Edgar and Alfreda is a 1677 tragedy by the English writer Edward Ravenscroft. It was first staged by the King's Company at the Theatre Royal, Drury Lane. It is based on the life of the early English King Edwgar and his wife Alfreda.

The original cast included Michael Mohun as Edgar, Cardell Goodman as Ethelwold, Nicholas Burt as Ruthin, Thomas Clark as Aldernold, John Wiltshire as Oswold, Philip Griffin as Durzo, Frances Maria Knight as The Queen and Elizabeth Boutell as Matilda.

== Bibliography ==
- Van Lennep, W. The London Stage, 1660-1800: Volume One, 1660-1700. Southern Illinois University Press, 1960.
