= Katherine Corey =

English actress

Katherine Corey (fl. 1660–1692) was an English actress of the Restoration era, one of the first generation of female performers to appear on the public stage in Britain. Corey played with the King's Company and the United Company, and had one of the longest careers of any actress in her generation. In "The humble petition of Katherine Corey" (see below), she stated that she "was the first and is the last of all the actresses that were constituted by King Charles the Second at His Restauration."

Correy started her career under her maiden name, Mitchell, but was Mrs. Corey by 1663. "Mrs Corey was a big woman with a gift for comedy. She was popular in a variety of roles, but especially in old women parts: scolding wives, mothers, governesses, waiting women, and bawds." In his Diary, Samuel Pepys, who admired Corey's talents, calls her "Doll Common" after her part in Ben Jonson's The Alchemist.

In her three decades on the stage, Corey played a wide range of roles; in revivals of plays from the period of English Renaissance theatre:

- Lady Would-be in Jonson's Volpone
- Mrs. Otter in Epicene
- Sempronia in Catiline
- Arane in Beaumont and Fletcher's A King and No King
- Abigail in The Scornful Lady
- Duchess Sophia in Rollo Duke of Normandy
- Quisania in The Island Princess
- Mrs. Trainwell in Brome's The Northern Lass

— and in contemporary works, by John Dryden:

- Octavia in All for Love
- Melissa in The Maiden Queen
- an Englishwoman in Amboyna
- Bromia in Amphitryon

— and by William Wycherley:

- Lucy in The Country Wife
- Widow Blackacre in The Plain Dealer
- Mrs. Joyner in Love in a Wood

— and Nathaniel Lee:

- Agrippina in The Tragedy of Nero
- Cumana in Sophonisba, or the Death of Hannibal
- Sysigambis in The Rival Queens

— and other authors:

- Cleorin in Boyle's The Black Prince
- Rosellia, leader of the Amazons, in D'Urfey's The Commonwealth of Women
- Mrs. Touchstone in Tate's Cuckold's Haven
- Crowstich in D'Urfey's Love for Money
- Mopsophil in Behn's The Emperor of the Moon
- Quickthrift in Edward Howard's The Man of Newmarket

— and many other parts, in plays by Edward Ravenscroft, Thomas Southerne, Thomas Shadwell, and others. Corey had a notable success as Strega, the title character in Thomas Duffet's The Amorous Old Woman in 1674. She played in other Duffet works too:

- Redstreak in Psyche Debauch'd
- Teresa in The Spanish Rogue.

Corey's performance as Sempronia in Catiline was a focus of controversy. Nell Gwyn was quarrelling with the noblewoman Lady Elizabeth Harvey in 1669; Gwyn called the Lady a hermaphrodite and claimed to have repulsed her lesbian advances. Gwyn also bribed and coached Corey into mimicking Harvey in her role as Sempronia. Lady Harvey hired thugs to hiss Corey onstage and throw oranges at her. The matter caused a major scandal. Lady Harvey prevailed upon the Lord Chamberlain (her cousin Edward Montagu, 2nd Earl of Manchester) to arrest Corey and interrogate her; but Harvey's rival Lady Castlemaine got the King to release the actress. (Gwyn and Lady Harvey later became friends).

In the Spring of 1689, Mrs. Corey became involved in an attempt by some actors in the United Company to form an independent troupe under the management of Henry Killigrew. When that effort failed, manager Charles Killigrew would not allow Corey back into the United Company; she appealed to the Lord Chamberlain, with the "humble petition" cited above, to be re-admitted, and won re-instatement. She continued to act a variety of parts —

- Mrs. Bumfiddle in D'Urfey's The Marriage-Hater Matched
- Mrs. Flint in Behn's The Widow Ranter
- The Abbess of Charlton in The Merry Devil of Edmonton

— and others during the final phase of her career. (Though in her 1689 "humble petition" to the Lord Chamberlain, she noted that she was never paid more than 30 shillings a week.)

As one of the earliest actresses with the King's Company, Corey has been nominated as a possibility for the honour of the "first English actress," who played Desdemona in an 8 December 1660 performance of Othello. Most commentators, however, think Corey's lack of physical beauty makes her an unlikely Desdemona, and prefer Margaret Hughes or Anne Marshall for the distinction.
