= Carey Perin =

English actor

Carey Perin (occasionally written as Perrin) was an English stage actor of the seventeenth century. He was a long-standing member of the King's Company based at the Theatre Royal, Drury Lane. He then joined the merged United Company in 1682. His last known role was in Thomas Southerne's The Maid's Last Prayer.

== Selected roles ==
- Cicco in The Amorous Old Woman by Thomas Duffett (1674)
- Meleager in The Rival Queens by Nathaniel Lee (1677)
- Zannazarro in Wits Led by the Nose by William Chamberlayne (1677)
- Plodwell in The Man of Newmarket by Edward Howard (1678)
- Physician in Trick for Trick Thomas D'Urfey (1678)
- Sir Geoffrey Jolt in The Rambling Justice by John Leanerd (1678)
- Old Gentlewoman in The Country Innocence by John Leanerd (1678)
- Benedick in Sir Barnaby Whigg by Thomas D'Urfey (1681)
- Meroin in The Heir of Morocco by Elkanah Settle (1682)
- Labienus in Constantine the Great by Nathaniel Lee (1683)
- Longmore in The Devil of a Wife by Thomas Jevon (1686)
- Christian in The Maid's Last Prayer by Thomas Southerne (1693)

== Bibliography ==
- Van Lennep, W. The London Stage, 1660–1800: Volume One, 1660–1700. Southern Illinois University Press, 1960.
- Wilson, John Harold. Mr. Goodman the Player. University of Pittsburgh Press, 1964.
