= Sarah Cooke =

English actress

Sarah Cooke (died 1688) was an English stage actress of the seventeenth century. She was a member of the King's Company, based at the Theatre Royal, Drury Lane. She played a number of lead roles during the 1680s.

Her aunt was the governess to the maids of honour of the Duchess of York in the 1660s. After some time working in this role alongside her aunt, Cooke was discovered by the Earl of Rochester, who promoted her theatrical career. In hear early years with the King's Company she mostly appeared on tour or with the nursery company, devoted to developing new talent. It was likely during this time she was under the management of John Coysh. In 1677 she played her first known role at Drury Lane in The Country Innocence and acted for the King's Company united 1682 when the merged United Company was formed and she was frequently employed by it until her death six years later. As with many actors of the era, the full number of her roles is unknown due to poor records.

== Selected roles ==
- Gillian in The Country Innocence by John Leanerd (1677)
- Flora in The Rambling Justice by John Leanerd (1678)
- Livia in Sir Barnaby Whigg by Thomas D'Urfey (1681)
- Countess of Rutland in The Unhappy Favourite by John Banks (1681)
- Semanthe in The Loyal Brother by Thomas Southerne (1682)
- Serena in Constantine the Great by Nathaniel Lee (1683)
- Erminia in The Disappointment by Thomas Southerne (1684)
- Aminta in A Commonwealth of Women by Thomas D'Urfey (1685)
- Dona Elvira in The Banditti by Thomas D'Urfey (1686)
- Lady Lovemore in The Devil of a Wife by Thomas Jevon (1686)
- Elvira in The Emperor of the Moon by Aphra Behn (1687)

== Bibliography ==
- Highfill, Philip H, Burnim, Kalman A. & Langhans, Edward A. A Biographical Dictionary of Actors, Actresses, Musicians, Dancers, Managers and Other Stage Personnel in London, 1660–1800: Cabanel to Cory. SIU Press, 1975.
- Van Lennep, W. The London Stage, 1660–1800: Volume One, 1660–1700. Southern Illinois University Press, 1960.
