= The Rival Queens =

1677 play

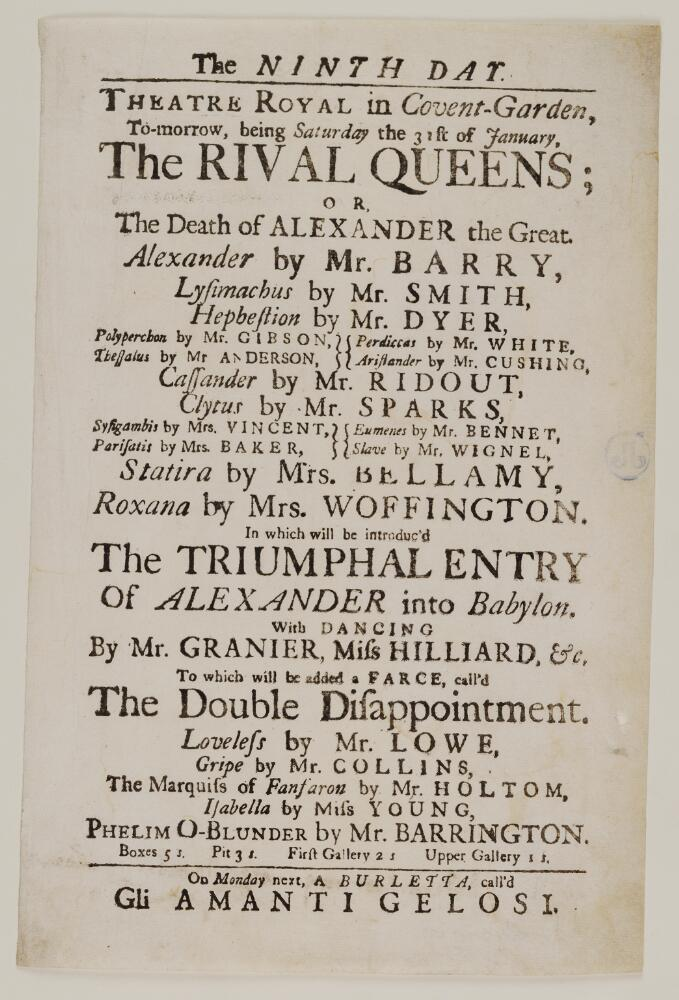
- 1747 Covent Garden playbill
- Original language: English
- Written by: Nathaniel Lee
- Genre: Tragedy

Premiere
- Date: 17 March 1677
- Place: Theatre Royal, Drury Lane, London

The Rival Queens, or the Death of Alexander the Great is a Restoration tragedy written by Nathaniel Lee c. 1677. Regarded as one of his best tragedies, the play revolves around Alexander the Great and his two wives, Roxana and Statira, whose competition for his affections ends in tragedy. The play was largely influenced by French dramatist La Calprenède's historic romance Cassandre.

== Performance history ==
The play was first performed at the Theatre Royal in London by the King's Company. The original cast included Charles Hart as Alexander, Michael Mohun as Clytus, Philip Griffin as Lysimachus, Thomas Clark as Hephestion, Cardell Goodman as Polyperchon, Edward Kynaston as Cassander, Martin Powell as Philip, John Wiltshire as Thessalus, Edward Lydall as Perdiccas, Marmaduke Watson as Eumenes, Carey Perin as Meleager, John Coysh as Aristander, Katherine Corey as Sysigambis, Elizabeth Boutell as Statira and Anne Marshall as Roxana.

== Bibliography ==
- Van Lennep, W. The London Stage, 1660-1800: Volume One, 1660-1700. Southern Illinois University Press, 1960.
