= The Loyal Brother =

1682 play

- Original language: English
- Written by: Thomas Southerne
- Genre: Tragedy

Premiere
- Date: 4 February 1682
- Place: Theatre Royal, Drury Lane, London

The Loyal Brother; Or, The Persian Prince is a 1682 tragedy by the Irish writer Thomas Southerne. It was first performed by the King's Company at the Theatre Royal, Drury Lane in London. The prologue was written by John Dryden. It was Southerne's first play and was written in the context of the recent Exclusion Crisis and the Popish Plot from a Tory viewpoint. Two characters are thinly disguised versions of contemporary figures, the heroic Tachmas is James, Duke of York and the villain is the Whig politician the Earl of Shaftesbury. It was staged at a time when the growing Tory Reaction had swung power away from the Whigs trying to exclude the Catholic York from the throne.

The original Drury Lane cast included Cardell Goodman as Seliman, Thomas Clark as Tachmas, Michael Mohun as Ismael, Philip Griffin as Arbanes, Richard Saunders as Osman, Katherine Corey as Begona, Sarah Cooke as Semanthe and Anne Marshall as Sunamire. The published play was dedicated to the Duke of Richmond, Master of the Horse and illegitimate son of Charles II.

== Bibliography ==
- Nicoll, Allardyce. A History of English Drama 1660-1900. Volume I. Cambridge University Press, 2009.
- Van Lennep, W. The London Stage, 1660-1800: Volume One, 1660-1700. Southern Illinois University Press, 1960.
