= The Man of Newmarket =

1678 play

- Original language: English
- Written by: Edward Howard
- Genre: Restoration Comedy

Premiere
- Date: March 1678
- Place: Theatre Royal, Drury Lane, London

The Man of Newmarket is a 1678 comedy play by the English writer Edward Howard. It was first staged at the Theatre Royal, Drury Lane by the King's Company.

The original cast featured John Wiltshire as Passal, Nicholas Burt as Maldrin, Martin Powell as Nonsuch, Joseph Haines as Whiffler, Thomas Clark as Swiftspur, Cardell Goodman as Trainsted, Philip Griffin as Bowser, Carey Perin as Plodwell, Michael Mohun as Breakbond, John Coysh as Pricknote, Mary Corbett as Clevly and Katherine Corey as Quickthridt.

== Bibliography ==
- Nicoll, Allardyce. History of English Drama, 1660-1900: Volume 1, Restoration Drama, 1660-1700. Cambridge University Press, 1952.
- Van Lennep, W. The London Stage, 1660-1800: Volume One, 1660-1700. Southern Illinois University Press, 1960.
