= Elizabeth Weaver (actress) =

- Born: Elizabeth Farley
- Partner: James Weaver
- Children: one

Elizabeth Weaver, born Elizabeth Farley (flourished 1660 to 1683) was an English actress in the King's Company from 1660 to 1683.

== Life ==
Weaver had taken some leading roles and Richard Flecknoe wrote a play for her but it is not certain that it was ever staged. She was said to be one of the original actresses in the King's Company when it was formed in 1660.

Weaver came to some notice in 1662 when she was taken to court by James Weaver. She had taken his name although they were not married and according to Weaver she had used his name to build up debts of thirty pounds. Not much is known of her former history but Samuel Pepys wrote that he was told that she had lost her virginity to King Charles II. This was before the King started his affair with the actress Nell Gwynne and Pepys did not approve of the prince's behaviour.

Weaver was sacked by Sir Robert Howard and asked to return all her scripts as he was shocked to find out that she was pregnant. He believed that this would shock other women as she was not married. She had quit on finding that all of her roles had been given to other actresses. He wrote of his shock even though she had been appearing as Biancha, an unrepentant adulteress in the play Love's Sacrifice. Howard believed that she would never act again, but he was wrong.

She continued to act but not in such major roles. In 1671 she returned to the name of Farley. She is not mentioned after she played Eudoria in The Rambling Justice and "the whore" in Trick for Trick. Both of these were new plays were staged by the King's Company in 1678.
