= Elizabeth Cox (actress) =

English actress

Elizabeth "Betty" Cox was an English stage actress of the seventeenth century.

== Life ==
Her debut was in March 1671 when she acted Lydia in William Wycherley's Love in a Wood, for the King's Company, based at the Theatre Royal, Drury Lane. She left the stage in 1675 but returned briefly in 1682.

== Selected roles ==
- Lydia in Love in a Wood by William Wycherley (1671)
- Violetta in The Assignation by John Dryden (1672)
- Palmrya in Marriage à la mode by John Dryden (1672)
- Octavia in Nero by Nathaniel Lee (1674)
- Constantia in The Amorous Old Woman by Thomas Duffet (1674)
- Desdemona in Othello by William Shakespeare (1675)
- Panthea in A King and No King by John Fletcher (1675)
- Indamora in Aureng-zebe by John Dryden (1675)
- Sophonisba in Sophonisba by Nathaniel Lee (1675)
- Artemira in The Heir of Morocco by Elkanah Settle (1682)

== Bibliography ==
- Highfill, Philip H, Burnim, Kalman A. & Langhans, Edward A. A Biographical Dictionary of Actors, Actresses, Musicians, Dancers, Managers & Other Stage Personnel in London, 1660–1800:. SIU Press, 1982.
- Lanier, Henry Wysham. The First English Actresses: From the Initial Appearance of Women on the Stage in 1660 Till 1700. The Players, 1930.
- Van Lennep, W. The London Stage, 1660–1800: Volume One, 1660–1700. Southern Illinois University Press, 1960.
