= The Amorous Old Woman =

1674 play

- Original language: English
- Written by: Thomas Duffet
- Genre: Restoration Comedy

Premiere
- Date: March 1674
- Place: Lincoln's Inn Fields Theatre, London

The Amorous Old Woman; Or, 'Tis Well If It Take is a 1674 comedy play by the English writer Thomas Duffet. It was originally staged by the King's Company at the Lincoln's Inn Fields Theatre. It was part of the tradition of Restoration comedy.

Given the number of younger actors in the cast, it may have been a lenten play. The original cast included William Beeston as Amante, Carey Perin as Cicco, John Coysh as Riccamare, Martin Powell as Furfante, Elizabeth Cox as Constantia, Elizabeth James as Arabella, Elizabeth Boutell as Clara and Katherine Corey as Strega.

== Bibliography ==
- Canfield, J. Douglas. Tricksters and Estates: On the Ideology of Restoration Comedy. University Press of Kentucky, 2014.
- Van Lennep, W. The London Stage, 1660-1800: Volume One, 1660-1700. Southern Illinois University Press, 1960.
