= The Unhappy Favourite =

1681 play

- Original language: English
- Written by: John Banks
- Genre: Tragedy
- Setting: Tudor England

Premiere
- Date: May 1681
- Place: Theatre Royal, Drury Lane, London

The Unhappy Favourite; Or, The Earl Of Essex is a 1681 tragedy by the English writer John Banks. It was originally staged by the King's Company at the Theatre Royal, Drury Lane in London. It portrays the downfall of the Earl of Essex, favourite of Elizabeth I, and his subsequent execution following Essex's Rebellion.

The first Drury Lane cast included Thomas Clark as The Earl of Essex, Philip Griffin as Earl of Southampton, Michael Mohun as Burleigh, Thomas Disney as Sir Walter Raleigh, Anne Marshall as Queen Elizabeth, Sarah Cooke as Countess of Rutland and Mary Corbett as Countess of Nottingham. John Dryden wrote a special prologue for a performance attended by Charles II and his wife Catherine of Braganza.

Banks dedicated the published version of 1682 to Princess Anne, niece of the king, who herself later came to the throne. The play was revived numerous times during the following century. In 1731 James Ralph wrote The Fall of the Earl of Essex, borrowing heavily from Banks.

== Bibliography ==
- Hageman, Elizabeth & Conway, Katherine. Resurrecting Elizabeth I in Seventeenth-century England. Fairleigh Dickinson Univ Press, 2007.
- Van Lennep, W. The London Stage, 1660-1800: Volume One, 1660-1700. Southern Illinois University Press, 1960.
