= Sophonisba (Lee play) =

1675 play

- Original language: English
- Written by: Nathaniel Lee
- Genre: Tragedy
- Setting: Ancient Carthage, 3rd Century BC

Premiere
- Date: 30 April 1675
- Place: Theatre Royal, Drury Lane

Sophonisba, or Hannibal's Overthrow is a 1675 verse drama tragedy by the English writer Nathaniel Lee. It is based on the story of the Carthaginian noblewoman Sophonisba, one of numerous versions based on the story including John Marston's The Wonder of Women (1606) and James Thomson's Sophonisba (1730).

It was first performed by the King's Company at Drury Lane with a cast that included Michael Mohun as Hannibal, Marmaduke Watson as Maherbal, Edward Kynaston as Scipio, William Wintershall as Lelius, Charles Hart as Massinissa, Thomas Clark as Massina.

The 1681 edition lists an altered cast that performed when the company was briefly in Oxford at the time of the Oxford Parliament. It features Mohun as Hannibal, Nicholas Burt as Maherbal, Wintershall as Bomilcar, Kynaston as Scipio, Edward Lydall as Lelius, Watson as Varro, Hart as Massinisa, Martin Powell as Trebellius, Clark as Massina, Philip Griffin as Menander, Elizabeth Cox as Sophonisba, Elizabeth Boutell as Rosalinda, Mary Knep as Aglave and Katherine Corey as Cumana.

Lee dedicated the published version to the Duchess of Portsmouth, mistress of Charles II. He did the same with his 1676 tragedy Gloriana. It also contained a prologue written by John Dryden at the time of the Oxford performances.

== Bibliography ==
- Hopkins, Graham. Constant Delights: Rakes, Rogues, and Scandal in Restoration England. Robson Books, 2002.
- Lowerre, Kathryn. The Lively Arts of the London Stage, 1675–1725. Routledge, 2016.
- Van Lennep, W. The London Stage, 1660-1800: Volume One, 1660-1700. Southern Illinois University Press, 1960.
