= Nicholas Burt =

British actor

Nicholas Burt (1621 ? — after 1689), or Birt or Burght among other variants, was a prominent English actor of the seventeenth century. In a long career, he was perhaps best known as the first actor to play the role of Othello in the Restoration era.

== Early life ==
A "Nicholas Bert" was christened on 27 May 1621, in Norwich; the record may refer to the actor, though this is not certain. According to James Wright's Historia Histrionica (1699), Burt began as a boy player with the King's Men, an apprentice of John Shank (died 1636). He was with the celebrated young company Beeston's Boys in the 1638–42 period. As a young actor filling female roles, Burt gained particular notice for playing Clariana in Shirley's Love's Cruelty.

After the theatres closed in 1642 at the start of the English Civil War, Burt, like some other actors, joined the Royalist army supporting the cause of King Charles I. Like fellow actors Charles Hart and Robert Shatterell, Burt served as an officer in the regiment of Prince Rupert in the early and mid-1640s. He most likely saw combat in the battles of Marston Moor and Naseby, and perhaps at Edgehill as well.

== Later life ==
Once the Civil War had ended, Burt returned to acting and to the King's Men: he was one of the performers arrested on 5 February 1648, during an illegal performance of Rollo Duke of Normandy (he played Latorch). He was also one of the ten men who tried to restart the King's Men in December 1648, despite the parliamentarians' opposition to playacting.

With the Restoration, Burt's professional fortunes revived. Burt took the lead role in a 1660 production of Shakespeare's Othello, the first staging of that play after the theatres re-opened; Walter Clun won fame for his portrayal of Iago in that production. Samuel Pepys was in the audience on 11 October 1660, and saw Burt's Othello again in 1669, as recorded in his Diary. (After that time, though, Burt lost the role to Hart.)

In 1661 Burt became one of the thirteen actors who were original sharers in the newly organized King's Company under the management of Thomas Killigrew. He continued with the King's Company until 1678. When the troupe's theatre, the Theatre Royal in Drury Lane, burned down in 1672, the funds to build its replacement had to be raised largely from the actors; Burt invested £160 in the project.

== Roles ==
Beyond Othello, Burt played a range of significant roles, in revivals of works by Shakespeare, Jonson and Fletcher:

- Prince Hal in Shakespeare's Henry IV plays
- Cleremont in Jonson's Epicene
- Corvino in Volpone
- Surly in The Alchemist
- Cicero in Catiline
- Seleucus in Fletcher's The Humorous Lieutenant
- Don John Decastrio in Rule a Wife and Have a Wife
- Tygranes in A King and No King
- the Elder Loveless in The Scornful Lady
- Charles in The Elder Brother

— and contemporary works, by John Dryden:

- Palamede in Marriage à la mode
- Perez in Amboyna
- Lysimantes in The Maiden Queen
- Don Lopez in An Evening's Love
- Vasquez in The Indian Emperour
- Camillo in The Assignation

— and by other dramatists:

- Maherbal in Lee's Sophonisba, or Hannibal's Overthrow
- Afterwit in Wilson's The Cheats
- Count Guesselin in Boyle's The Black Prince.

== Death ==
The date of Burt's death is not known; he was alive at least until 1690.
