= Anne Marshall =

English actress (fl. 1661–1682)

Anne Marshall (fl. 1661 – 1682), also Mrs. Anne Quin, was a leading English actress of the Restoration era, one of the first generation of women performers to appear on the public stage in England.

John Downes, in his Roscius Anglicanus (1708), reported that Anne Marshall was among the initial group of actresses employed by manager Thomas Killigrew with his King's Company when the company made the move to Gibbon's Tennis Court in 1660. Anne was revered for her roles in tragedies but was also known to play in breeches roles, wherein she would be playing a woman dressed as a boy. She had been nominated as possibly the "first English actress," the Desdemona in the performance of Othello on 8 December 1660. [See: Margaret Hughes; Katherine Corey.] Marshall certainly played Desdemona in later performances. She excelled in rhymed heroic tragedy, creating “excessively grandiose heroines which so delighted Restoration audiences.”

Marshall is thought to have played Zempoalla in the Dryden/Howard collaboration The Indian Queen in 1664. Reportedly, she did wonderfully but her voice was not as sweet as Mary Betterton's. She is known to have played the following roles with the King's Company:

- Celia in Jonson's Volpone
- the Lady in Beaumont and Fletcher's The Scornful Lady
- Evadne in The Maid's Tragedy
- Margarita in Fletcher's Rule a Wife and Have a Wife
- Edith in Rollo Duke of Normandy
- Celia in The Humorous Lieutenant
- Almeria in Dryden's The Indian Emperour
- Mrs. Double-Diligence in Wilson's The Cheats
- Celestina in Sir William Killigrew's The Siege of Urbin.

Anne Marshall married an actor named Peter Quin, or Gwyn, sometime after June 1665. Peter Quin was wanted by the police for acting without a warrant. She resumed her stage career as Mrs. Quin once the theatres re-opened after the plague epidemic and the Great Fire of 1665–66. When she returned in November 1666 she was treated as a newcomer. She quarreled with the management about her private dressing room with a chimney, which had been taken from her, and she got it back in May 1667. She played:

- Candiope in Dryden's The Maiden Queen
- Aurelia in An Evening's Love
- Alizia Pearce in Boyle's The Black Prince.

Marshall retired from the stage in 1668; but she resumed her career nine years later, this time with the rival Duke's Company under Thomas Betterton. With that troupe, her first role was Angelica Bianca in Aphra Behn's The Rover in March 1677. (Coincidentally, Marshall had been cast in the same role in the abortive all-female production of Thomas Killigrew's Thomaso in 1664.) She also played:

- Lady Knowell in Behn's Sir Patient Fancy
- Lady Squeamish in Otway's Friendship in Fashion
- Queen Elizabeth in Banks's The Unhappy Favourite
- Sunamira in Southerne's The Loyal Brother

— and other parts.

Anne Marshall had a younger sister, Rebecca Marshall, who joined her sister in the King's Company a few years after and was also a noted actress. Their father, Stephen Marshall, was a clergyman, the chaplain of Lord Gerard. Samuel Pepys mentions both Marshalls frequently in his Diary. The sisters played together at least once, in The Maiden Queen.

== See also ==
- Catherine Coleman
