= John Coysh =

English actor

John Coysh was an English stage actor of the seventeenth century. He was a member of the King's Company, based at the Theatre Royal, Drury Lane.

He first headed a nursery of young actors at Hatton Garden, including the future star Sarah Cooke. He also led a travelling troupe of actors to provincial theatres around Britain. The playwright Elkanah Settle helped produced drolls for the group to perform. From 1671 he was an established performer at Drury Lane. However his career on the London stage appears to have ended with the creation of the merged United Company in 1682.

== Selected roles ==
- Muly Labas in The Empress of Morocco by Elkanah Settle (1673)
- Mingo in The Spanish Rogue by Thomas Duffet (1673)
- Plautus in Nero by Nathaniel Lee (1674)
- Riccamare in The Amorous Old Woman by Thomas Duffet (1674)
- Jeffrey in Psyche Debauched by Thomas Duffet (1675)
- Aristander in The Rival Queens by Nathaniel Lee (1677)
- Physician in Trick for Trick by Thomas D'Urfey (1678)
- Sir Robert Malory in The Country Innocence by John Leanerd (1677)
- Another Priest in All for Love by John Dryden (1677)
- Dick Slywit in Wits Led by the Nose by William Chamberlayne (1677)
- Bramble in The Rambling Justice by John Leanerd (1678)
- Pricknote in The Man of Newmarket by Edward Howard (1678)
- Swif in Sir Barnaby Whigg by Thomas D'Urfey (1681)

== Bibliography ==
- Highfill, Philip H, Burnim, Kalman A. & Langhans, Edward A. A Biographical Dictionary of Actors, Actresses, Musicians, Dancers, Managers and Other Stage Personnel in London, 1660–1800: Cabanel to Cory. SIU Press, 1975.
- Van Lennep, W. The London Stage, 1660–1800: Volume One, 1660–1700. Southern Illinois University Press, 1960.
- Wilson, John Harold. Court Satires of the Restoration. Ohio State University Press, 1976.
