= Mithridates, King of Pontus =

1678 play

- Original language: English
- Written by: Nathaniel Lee
- Genre: Tragedy

Premiere
- Date: February 1678
- Place: Theatre Royal, Drury Lane, London

Mithridates, King of Pontus is a 1678 tragedy by the English writer Nathaniel Lee. It was first performed at the Theatre Royal, Drury Lane in London by the King's Company. John Dryden wrote the play's epilogue.

The original Drury Lane cast included Michael Mohun as Mithridates, Charles Hart as Ziphares, Cardell Goodman as Pharnaces, Philip Griffin as Archelaus, William Wintershall as Pelopidas, Martin Powell as Andravar, Thomas Clark as Aquilius, John Wiltshire as Another Roman Officer, Mary Corbett as Monima and Elizabeth Boutell as Semandra.

The play has been revived a number of times, including a 1708 version again at Drury Lane featuring Robert Wilks, John Mills, Barton Booth and Anne Oldfield.

== Bibliography ==
- Van Lennep, W. The London Stage, 1660-1800: Volume One, 1660-1700. Southern Illinois University Press, 1960.
