= The Spanish Rogue =

1673 play

- Original language: English
- Written by: Thomas Duffet
- Genre: Restoration Comedy

Premiere
- Date: March 1673
- Place: Theatre Royal, Drury Lane, London

The Spanish Rogue is a 1673 comedy play by the English writer Thomas Duffet. It was first performed at the Theatre Royal, Drury Lane by the King's Company.

The original cast included William Harris as Don Fenise, Edward Lydall as Don Alonzo, Marmaduke Watson as Don Manuel, Martin Powell as Larasco, John Coysh as Mingo, Philip Griffin as Sanchez, Elizabeth Boutell as Alcinda, Katherine Corey as Teresa and Elizabeth Knepp as Leonella.

== Bibliography ==
- Van Lennep, W. The London Stage, 1660-1800: Volume One, 1660-1700. Southern Illinois University Press, 1960.
