= Sir Barnaby Whigg =

1681 play

- Original language: English
- Written by: Thomas D'Urfey
- Music by: Henry Purcell
- Genre: Restoration Comedy
- Setting: London, present day

Premiere
- Date: October 1681
- Place: Theatre Royal, Drury Lane, London

Sir Barnaby Whigg; Or, No Wit Like A Womans is a 1681 comedy play by the English writer Thomas D'Urfey. It was first staged by the King's Company at the Theatre Royal, Drury Lane. A song for the play was composed by Henry Purcell.

The original cast included Thomas Clark as Wilding, Cardell Goodman as Townly, Philip Griffin as Porpuss, Martin Powell as Whigg, John Coysh as Swift, Carey Perin as Benedick, Mary Corbett as Gratiana, Sarah Cooke as Livia and Susanna Percival as Winifred. The published version was dedicated to the politician Lord Berkeley.

== Bibliography ==
- McVeagh, John. Thomas Durfey and Restoration Drama: The Work of a Forgotten Writer. Routledge, 2017.
- Van Lennep, W. The London Stage, 1660-1800: Volume One, 1660-1700. Southern Illinois University Press, 1960.
