= Constantine the Great (play) =

1683 play

- Original language: English
- Written by: Nathaniel Lee
- Genre: Tragedy
- Setting: Ancient Rome, 4th Century

Premiere
- Date: 12 November 1683
- Place: Theatre Royal, Drury Lane, London

Constantine the Great is a 1683 tragedy by the English dramatist Nathaniel Lee. It is based on the reign of the Roman Emperor Constantine the Great. It was first staged by the United Company at the Theatre Royal, Drury Lane in London. The epilogue was written by John Dryden.

The original Drury Lane cast included William Smith as Constantine, Thomas Betterton as Crispus, Philip Griffin as Dalmatius, Cardell Goodman as Annibal, John Wiltshire as Lycinius, Thomas Gillow as Arius, Carey Perin as Labienus, Richard Saunders as Eubolus, John Bowman as Sylvester, Elizabeth Barry as Fausta and Sarah Cooke as Serena.

== Bibliography ==
- Van Lennep, W. The London Stage, 1660-1800: Volume One, 1660-1700. Southern Illinois University Press, 1960.
