= Wits Led by the Nose =

1677 play

- Original language: English
- Written by: William Chamberlayne
- Genre: Restoration Comedy

Premiere
- Date: June 1677
- Place: Theatre Royal, Drury Lane, London

Wits Led by the Nose; Or, A Poet's Revenge is a 1677 comedy play by the English writer William Chamberlayne. It was first staged by the King's Company at the Theatre Royal, Drury Lane in London.

The original Drury Lane cast included Cardell Goodman as Antellus, Edward Lydall as Oroandes, Carey Perin as Zannazarro, Marmaduke Watson as Arratur, Martin Powell as Vanlore, Joseph Haines as Sir Symon Credulous, John Coysh as Dick Slywit and Elizabeth Boutell as Glorianda.

== Bibliography ==
- Van Lennep, W. The London Stage, 1660-1800: Volume One, 1660-1700. Southern Illinois University Press, 1960.
