= La Prude =

Comic play by Voltaire

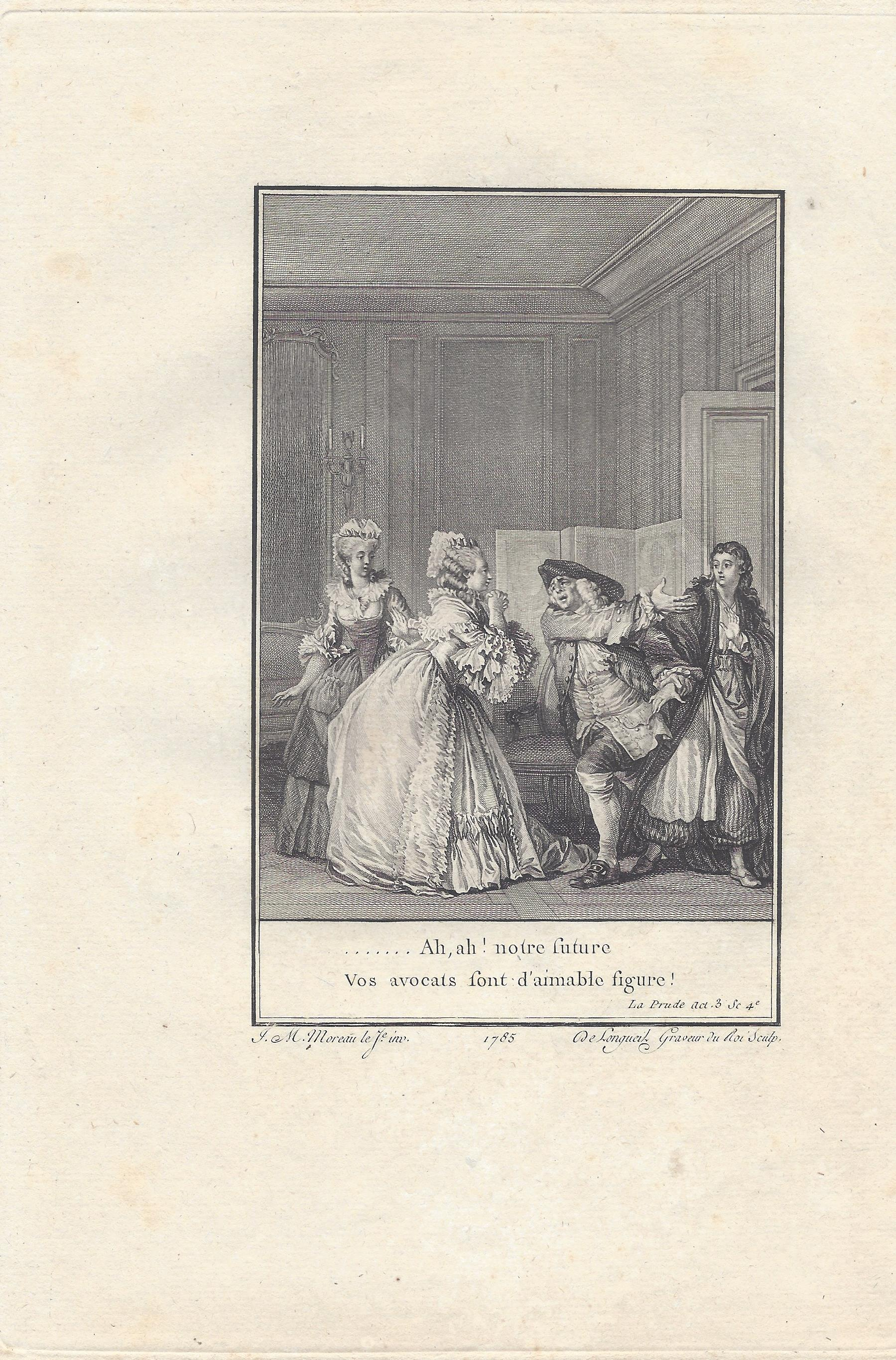
Voltaire: La Prude Act 3 Scene 4 Copper engraving by De Longueil

La Prude (The Prude) is a comic play by the French philosopher and author Voltaire, written in 1739. It is based on The Plain Dealer by William Wycherly, which in turn is based on Molière's The Misanthrope. It was performed once, in 1747, having been offered to the Comédie-Française but not accepted.
