= The Maiden Queen =

Restoration tragicomedy by John Dryden

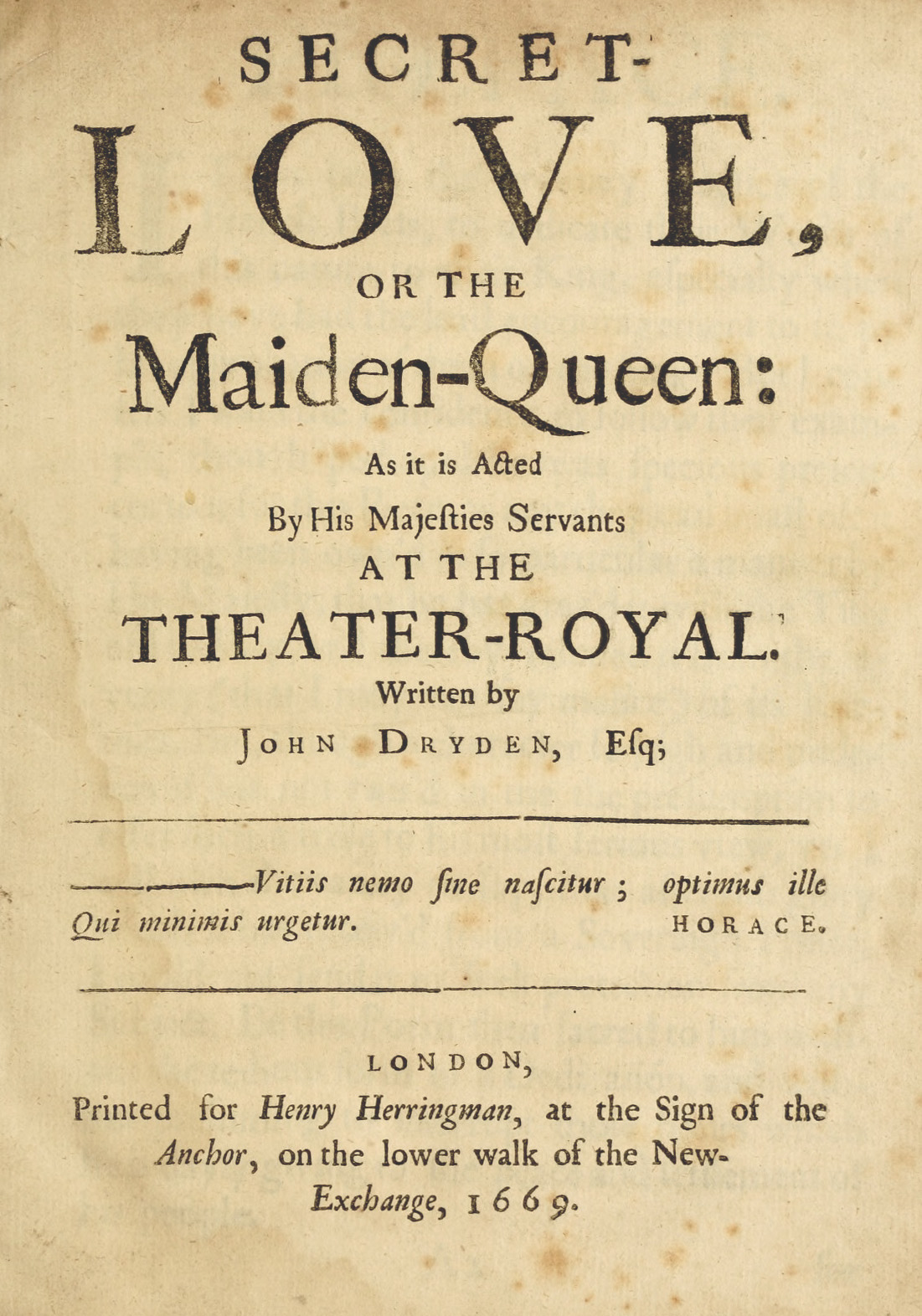
Title page of the 1669 impression of the first edition (Boston Public Library)

Secret Love, or The Maiden Queen is a 1667 tragicomedy written by John Dryden. The play, commonly known by its subtitle, was acted by the King's Company at the Theatre Royal, Drury Lane (which had escaped the Great Fire of London the year before). The premiere occurred on 2 March, and was a popular success. King Charles II, his brother the Duke of York and future King James II, and Samuel Pepys were all in the audience on opening night. The play was first published in 1668 by the London bookseller Henry Herringman.

The Maiden Queen was noteworthy as a vehicle for Nell Gwyn, who played the heroine Florimel. Pepys raved about her performance in his Diary — "so great performance of a comical part was never, I believe, in the world before...." He returned to see the play eight more times. It was also a special favourite of the King, who reportedly called it "his play."

In addition to Nell Gwyn, the original cast included Nicholas Burt as Lysimantes, Michael Mohun as Philocles, and Charles Hart as Celadon; Anne Marshall as Candiope and her sister Rebecca Marshall as the Queen, Mary Knep as Asteria, and Katherine Corey as Melissa. A later production in 1672 was cast entirely by women. Thomas Killigrew, manager of the King's Company, had developed this practice of all-female casts, starting with a 1664 staging of his own play The Parson's Wedding, as a way to capitalise on the Restoration innovation of actresses on the English stage.

Dryden composed the play in a mixture of rhymed verse, blank verse, and prose. Gerard Langbaine noted in the 1690s that Dryden drew plot materials from two prose fictions by Madeleine de Scudéry, Le Grand Cyrus (for the main plot) and Ibrahim, ou l'Illustre Bassa (for the subplot). (Dryden returned to Scudéry's Ibrahim for inspiration for another play, An Evening's Love, the following year, 1668 — though that venture proved much less successful.) Dryden also borrowed material from Shirley's Love in a Maze. By Dryden's own testimony, the unheroic Philocles was inspired by Magnus de la Garide, the royal favourite of Queen Christina of Sweden.

The drama was revived in an adapted form in 1707; Colley Cibber mixed it with materials from Marriage à la mode. The play remained in the repertory throughout the eighteenth century in various forms; a shortened version called Celadon and Florimel was acted as late as 1796. A London revival of The Maiden Queen occurred in 1886.
