= The Country Innocence =

1677 play

- Original language: English
- Written by: John Leanerd
- Genre: Restoration Comedy

Premiere
- Date: March 1677
- Place: Theatre Royal, Drury Lane, London

The Country Innocence; Or, The Chamber-maid Turn'd Quaker is a 1677 comedy play by the English writer John Leanerd. It was originally performed by the King's Company at the Theatre Royal, Drury Lane in London. It borrowed very heavily from the 1647 work The Countrie Girl by Thomas Brewer.

The first cast included Edward Lydall as Sir Oliver Bellingham, John Coysh as Sir Robert Malory, Cardell Goodman as Captain Mullineux, John Wiltshire as Plush, Philip Griffin as Rash, Joseph Haines as Gregory Dwindle, Martin Powell as Mr William, Marmaduke Watson as Old Thrashard, Carey Perin as Old Gentlewoman, Rebecca Marshall as Lady Lovely, Sarah Cooke as Gillian and Mary Knep as Barbara.

== Bibliography ==
- Konigsberg, Ira. Samuel Richardson and the Dramatic Novel. University Press of Kentucky, 2014.
- Van Lennep, W. The London Stage, 1660-1800: Volume One, 1660-1700. Southern Illinois University Press, 1960.
