= The Heir of Morocco =

1682 tragedy by Elkanah Settle

The Heir of Morocco, with the Death of Gayland
- Original language: English
- Written by: Elkanah Settle
- Setting: Algiers, Algeria

Premiere
- Date: 1682
- Place: Theatre Royal, Drury Lane, London

The Heir of Morocco, with the Death of Gayland is a 1682 tragedy by Restoration era playwright Elkanah Settle. The play premiered at the Theatre Royal, Drury Lane in London in 1682. The original cast included Phillip Griffin as Albuzeiden, Thomas Clark as Gayland, Carey Perin as Meroin, and Elizabeth Cox as Altemira.

The action of the play is set in Algiers, during an unspecified time period. All of the characters are fictitious, except for Gayland, who was loosely based on 17th century Moroccan warlord Khadir Ghaïlani. The play is a sequel to Settle's 1673 tragedy, The Empress of Morocco.

The drama was dedicated to Henrietta Wentworth, 6th Baroness Wentworth.

== Plot ==
Altemira, the Princess of Algiers, is overjoyed when her lover, Admiral Altomar, tells her that the king of Algiers, Albuzeiden, has allowed him to marry her. However, the pair's happiness is short lived, as Albuzeiden has a change of heart and decides to marry his daughter off to the arrogant usurper Gayland, who has just arrived in Algiers. The scheming courtier Meroin hatches a plot to murder Altemira and her father, but is prevented from doing so by Altomar, who saves Albuzeiden and Altemira by stabbing Meroin. Because Altemira refuses to wed Gayland, Albuzeiden places Altomar in prison, where he is confronted by Gayland, who desires to challenge him. After Altomar kills Gayland in self defense, he is brutally tortured and executed. As Altomar dies, Albuzeiden finds out that the man he has sentenced to death is a natural born heir to the seat of Morocco, but was sent out of the country as an infant in order to avoid being murdered by the woman who occupied the throne at that time, the titular villainess in The Empress of Morocco. Altomar was brought up without being aware of his true heritage. Albuzeiden laments Altomar's death, as he could have married Altemira to a potential emperor. Shortly there afterwards, a mad Altemira commits suicide before Albuzeiden. An anguished Albuzeiden then kills himself as well.

== Scholarship ==
The scholar Met'Eb Ali Alnwairan argues that the play functions as a means for Settle to comment on politics in late 17th century England.
