= Walter Clun =

English actor

Walter Clun (died 2 August 1664) was an English actor of the 17th century. His career spanned the difficult period when the theatres were closed during the English Civil War and the Interregnum, from 1642 to 1660.

According to James Wright's Historia Histrionica (1699), Clun and Charles Hart were boy players together with the King's Men in the years prior to the theatre closure. Clun was a member of a group of English actors who performed on the Continent, mainly in The Hague and Paris, between 1644 and 1646; he was also one of the former King's Men who tried to restart the company in December 1648, despite the parliamentarian regime's hostility to theatre. (The effort was not successful.)

In the Restoration era, Clun gained particular notice as the Iago to Nicholas Burt's Othello in the earliest Restoration production of Shakespeare's play in 1660. Clun was among the thirteen actors who were initial sharers in the newly organized King's Company in 1661. In addition to Iago, Clun was strongly associated with the roles of Falstaff, Bessus in Beaumont and Fletcher's A King and No King, Smug in The Merry Devil of Edmonton, and Subtle in Jonson's The Alchemist. He also played Cacafogo in Fletcher's Rule a Wife and Have a Wife.

Clun may have reached the peak of his career in the title role in Fletcher's The Humorous Lieutenant; the King's Company played that drama for twelve days straight when they opened the lavish new Theatre Royal in Drury Lane in 1663. If so, his peak did not last for long: Clun was killed during a robbery near Kentish Town on the night of 2 August 1664. He was wounded in the arm by the thieves, bound hand and foot, and left in a ditch to bleed to death. Samuel Pepys, who had a strong admiration for Clun's acting, visited the spot of the murder three days after it occurred. He also reminisced in his Diary about Clun's skill onstage. (Pepys criticized Michael Mohun, the actor who took over the role of Iago, for not being as good in it as Clun had been.)

After Clun's death, an anonymous verse elegy was published in his memory. The poet reminds his readers that Clun's performances in female roles a quarter-century earlier had "made us weep, at seeming sorrow swell, / To see and hear like truth a fiction fell."

John Aubrey mentioned Clun in his famous Brief Lives. Aubrey wrote that "Ben Jonson had one eye lower than the other, and bigger, like Clun, the player; perhaps he begot Clun."
