= The Plain Dealer (play) =

1676 play written by William Wycherley

The Plain Dealer is a Restoration comedy by William Wycherley, first performed on 11 December 1676. The play is based on Molière's Le Misanthrope, and is generally considered Wycherley's finest work along with The Country Wife.

The play was highly praised by John Dryden and John Dennis, though it was equally condemned for its obscenity by many. Throughout the eighteenth century it was performed in a bowdlerised version by Isaac Bickerstaffe.

The title character is Captain Manly, a sailor who doubts the motives of everyone he meets except for his sweetheart, Olivia, and his friend, Vernish. When Olivia jilts him and marries Vernish, he attempts to gain revenge by sending a pageboy (who, unknown to him, is a girl named Fidelia in disguise and is in love with him) to seduce Olivia. When the truth of the page's identity is discovered, Manly marries her instead.

The French philosopher, historian, and dramatist Voltaire adapted The Plain Dealer to make his own play, titled La Prude (The Prude).
