= Elizabeth Knepp =

Elizabeth Knepp or Knipp (died 1681) was an English actress, singer, and dancer.

The earliest theatrical reference to Knepp is from 1664, as being intended by Thomas Killigrew to play the part of Lusetta in his play Thomaso. This means that she was probably in his troupe, the King's Company, by that time. From 1666 onwards she is recorded as playing many parts, both tragic and comic, including Lady Fidget in William Wycherley's The Country Wife. In 1664, she became the first woman to perform the title role in Jonson's Epicoene. She also occasionally spoke prologues and epilogues, and often danced and sang in or between acts.

Knepp's husband, Christopher Knepp, was a horse dealer who did not travel with her to London very often; he was reputedly "ill-natured" and may have treated her badly. Samuel Pepys was fascinated by Knepp, and his diary for 1666—68 is full of references to her, including mentions of amorous encounters, and descriptions of how much he enjoyed her flirtatiousness and especially her singing. In the late 1670s she became mistress to the actor Joseph Haines, and died in 1681 giving birth to his stillborn child.

== Sources ==
- Highfill, Philip Jr, Burnim, Kalman A., and Langhans, Edward (1973–93). Biographical Dictionary of Actors, Actresses, Musicians, Dancers, Managers and Other Stage Personnel in London, 1660–1800. 16 volumes. Carbondale, Illinois: Southern Illinois University Press.
