= The Dancing Master (opera) =

Opera by Malcolm Arnold

The Dancing Master, Op. 34, is a one-act 1952 English-language opera by Malcolm Arnold to a libretto by Joe Mendoza after William Wycherley's 1671 play The Gentleman Dancing Master. Written in 1951-1952 for a BBC commission, it was rejected by the BBC as "too bawdy for family audiences".

== Composition and performance ==
Joe Mendoza, formerly an assistant with the GPO/Crown Film Unit, had already prepared Wycherly's play as a potential film script for Margaret Lockwood when the commission for Arnold at the BBC came up and returned the libretto to Arnold quickly. Ten years after the BBC's rejection of the opera, a first concert performance was given by Arnold's friends at the Barnes music club at Kitson Hall, Barnes, 1 March 1962. The first full semi-staged performance was at the 2012 Malcolm Arnold Festival at the Royal and Derngate in Arnold's birthplace Northampton given by the Ealing Symphony Orchestra under John Gibbons paired with Strauss' Die Fledermaus. The first fully staged performance was in 2015 at Guildhall School of Music & Drama conducted by Dominic Wheeler, and paired with Donizetti's I pazzi per progetto. The opera was staged at Buxton Opera House in 2021, set as if performed for the microphone in a 1952 BBC radio studio, with rattled cutlery shown producing sound effects for a sword fight.

== Plot ==
Miranda's aunt, Mrs Caution, wishes Miranda to marry her dandy son, who goes by the affected title "Monsieur", but Miranda prefers another man, Gerard. When Miranda's father, who affects being a Spaniard and goes by "Diego" rather than James, discovers Gerard has entered Miranda's bedroom by a ladder, Gerard claims to be a dancing master preparing Miranda to dance with Monsieur. Unimpressed, Mrs Caution demands that Gerard prove his dancing skills. Miranda's cunning maid, Prue, tries to seduce Monsieur. Miranda and Gerard conduct a secret marriage, which her father, as a Spaniard, can only forgive and approve.

== Characters ==
- Miranda (Soprano)
- Prue, Miranda's scheming maid (Mezzo-soprano)
- Mrs Caution, Miranda's aunt (Contralto)
- Gerard, Miranda's beloved (Tenor)
- "Monsieur", Miranda's betrothed (Tenor)
- "Diego", Miranda's father (Bass-baritone)

== Recording ==
Malcolm Arnold: The Dancing Master Mark Wilde, Ed Lyon, Fiona Kimm, Graeme Broadbent, Catherine Carby, Eleanor Dennis. BBC Concert Orchestra, John Andrews released 25th Sep 2020 RES10269 Resonus Classics 75 minutes.
