= Trick for Trick (1678 play) =

1678 play

- Original language: English
- Written by: Thomas D'Urfey
- Genre: Restoration Comedy

Premiere
- Date: March 1678
- Place: Theatre Royal, Drury Lane, London

Trick For Trick; Or, The Debauch'd Hypocrite is a 1678 comedy play by English writer Thomas D'Urfey. It was first staged at the Theatre Royal, Drury Lane by the King's Company.

The original Drury Lane cast included Michael Mohun as Sir Wilding Frollick, Charles Hart as Monsieur Thomas, Philip Griffin as Valentine, Thomas Clark as Franck, Cardell Goodman as Hylas, Martin Powell as Sir Peregreen, Joseph Haines as Launce, John Coysh, Marmaduke Watson and Carey Perin as Physicians, Elizabeth Boutell as Cellida, Mary Corbett as Sabina, and Mary Knep as Mrs Dorothy.

== Bibliography ==
- McVeagh, John. Thomas Durfey and Restoration Drama: The Work of a Forgotten Writer. Routledge, 2017.
- Van Lennep, W. The London Stage, 1660-1800: Volume One, 1660-1700. Southern Illinois University Press, 1960.
