= Psyche Debauched =

1675 play

- Original language: English
- Written by: Thomas Duffet
- Genre: Restoration Comedy

Premiere
- Date: August 1675
- Place: Theatre Royal, Drury Lane, London

Psyche Debauched is a 1675 comedy play by the English writer Thomas Duffett. It was first staged by the King's Company at the Theatre Royal, Drury Lane. The play is a burlesque of Thomas Shadwell's tragedy, Psyche.

The original cast included Mary Corbett as King Andrew, Mary Knep as Nicholas, Edward Lydall as Apollo, John Coysh as Jeffrey, Martin Powell as Costard, John Wiltshire as Justice Crabb, Joseph Haines as None-so-fair, Thomas Clark as Woossat

Psyche Debauched remained in the Theatre Royal, Drury Lane's repertory for a quarter of a century.

== Plot summary ==
Two princes have been vying for the Princess None-so-fair's affections, but she is interested in neither of them. Princess None-so-fair's sisters are both in love with the princes, who do not return their feelings. The two sisters, envious of the princess, are happy to learn that Mother Woossat, the local brothel owner, is plotting to stage their sister's death; Mother Woossat is experiencing a shortage of customers because large amounts of men continuously fall in love with the princess, and by removing her from the picture, Mother Woossat's business will thrive once more. Mother Woossat enlists the church to convince Princess None-so-fair's father to marry her off to a large white bear, who is actually Mother Woosat's son, Bruin, in disguise. It is believed that Princess None-so-fair has been eaten by the bear, but in reality, she is living happily with Bruin. The pair is eventually separated when Mother Woossat, jealous of her relationship with Bruin, sends Princess None-so-fair to prison. Luckily, the lovers are later reunited when Bruin arrives to rescue her.

== Bibliography ==
- Van Lennep, W. The London Stage, 1660-1800: Volume One, 1660-1700. Southern Illinois University Press, 1960.
- Duffet, Thomas. Psyche Debauch'd, a Comedy: As it was Acted at the Theatre-Royal. Printed for John Smith in Great Queen Street, 1678
