= Gloriana (play) =

1676 play

- Original language: English
- Written by: Nathaniel Lee
- Genre: Tragedy

Premiere
- Date: 29 February 1676
- Place: Theatre Royal, Drury Lane, London

Gloriana; Or, The Court of Augustus Caesar is 1676 tragedy by the English writer Nathaniel Lee. It was first performed by the King's Company at the Theatre Royal, Drury Lane in London.

The original cast included Michael Mohun as Augustus Caesar, Charles Hart as Caesario, Edward Kynaston as Marcellus, Edward Lydall as Tiberius, William Cartwright as Agrippa, Philip Griffin as Mecaenas, Thomas Clark as Ovid, Martin Powell as Leander, Rebecca Marshall as Gloriana, Elizabeth James as Julia and Mary Corbett as Narcissa. The published play was dedicated to the Duchess of Portsmouth, mistress of Charles II.

The play is set in the Roman Empire during the reign of the first Roman Emperor Augustus. Amongst other things it portrays the Emperor's banishment of the poet Ovid from Rome.

== Bibliography ==
- Hopkins, David, Martindale, Charles. The Oxford History of Classical Reception in English Literature: The Oxford History of Classical Reception in English Literature: Volume 3 (1660-1790). OUP Oxford, 2012.
- Van Lennep, W. The London Stage, 1660-1800: Volume One, 1660-1700. Southern Illinois University Press, 1960.
