= Countess of Nottingham =

Countess of Nottingham is the title given to the wife of the Earl of Nottingham. Women who have held the title include:

- Catherine Carey, Countess of Nottingham (c.1547-1603)
- Margaret Howard, Countess of Nottingham (c.1591-1639)
- Essex Finch, Countess of Nottingham (c.1652-1684)
- Anne Finch, Countess of Nottingham (1668–1743)
- Georgiana Finch-Hatton, Countess of Winchilsea & Nottingham (1791–1835)
