= An Evening's Love =

Restoration comedy by John Dryden

- Original language: English
- Written by: John Dryden
- Genre: Restoration Comedy

Premiere
- Date: 12 June 1668
- Place: Theatre Royal, Drury Lane, London

An Evening's Love, or The Mock Astrologer is a comedy in prose by John Dryden. It was first performed before Charles II and Queen Catherine by the King's Company at the Theatre Royal on Bridges Street, London, on Friday, 12 June 1668. Samuel Pepys saw the play on 20 June of that year, but did not like it; in his Diary he called it "very smutty."

The play was first published in 1671 by Henry Herringman; Dryden dedicated the work to William Cavendish, Duke of Newcastle.

== Sources ==
Dryden's sources for An Evening's Love include Thomas Corneille's comedy Le Feint Astrologue, Madeleine de Scudéry's novel Ibrahim, ou l'Illustre Bassa, and Calderón's comedy El Astrologo fingido, as well as several other French, Spanish, Italian, and English works.

== Plot ==
The action of the play takes place in Madrid on the last night before Lent, 1665, and involves two young English gentlemen, Wildblood and Bellamy, and their comic servant Maskall, who fall in love with two beautiful young Spanish ladies, Donna Theodosia and Donna Jacinta, and their clever servant Beatrix.

== Cast ==
The original production featured Charles Hart as Wildblood, Michael Mohun as Bellamy, Nell Gwyn as Jacinta, Nicholas Burt as Don Lopez, William Wintershall as Don Alonzo, Robert Shatterell as Maskal, Edward Lydall as Don Melchor de Guzman, Elizabeth Boutell as Donna Theodosia, Anne Marshall as Aurelia, and Mary Knep as Beatrix.

== Bibliography ==
- Canfield, J. Douglas. Tricksters and Estates: On the Ideology of Restoration Comedy. University Press of Kentucky, 2014.
- Van Lennep, W. The London Stage, 1660-1800: Volume One, 1660-1700. Southern Illinois University Press, 1960.
