= The Rambling Justice =

1678 play

- Original language: English
- Written by: John Leanerd
- Genre: Restoration Comedy
- Setting: London, present day

Premiere
- Date: March 1678
- Place: Theatre Royal, Drury Lane, London

The Rambling Justice; Or, The Jealous Husbands is a 1678 comedy play by the English writer John Leanerd. It was first staged at the Theatre Royal, Drury Lane by the King's Company.

The original Drury Lane cast included Martin Powell as Sir Arthur Twilight, John Wiltshire as Sir Generall Amorous, Thomas Disney as Contentious Surly, Carey Perin as Sir Geoffrey Jolt, John Coysh as Bramble and Sarah Cooke as Flora.

== Bibliography ==
- Van Lennep, W. The London Stage, 1660-1800: Volume One, 1660-1700. Southern Illinois University Press, 1960.
