= John Wilson (playwright) =

English playwright and lawyer (1626–1696)

- Born: 1626; London, England
- Died: 1696 (Aged 70); London, England
- Education: Exeter College, Oxford
- Occupations: Lawyer, Playwright
- Employer: James II of England
- Organization: Lincoln's Inn
- Notable work: The Cheats (1663); Andronicus Comnenius (1664); Belphegor (1691)

John Wilson (1626–1696) was an English playwright and lawyer.

== Life and work ==
He was son of Aaron Wilson, a royalist divine, and was born in London in 1626. He matriculated from Exeter College, Oxford, in 1644, and entered Lincoln's Inn two years later, being called to the bar in 1649. His unswerving support of the royal pretensions recommended him to James, duke of York, through whose influence he became Recorder of Derry about 1681. His Discourse of Monarchy (1684), a tract in favour of the succession of the duke of York, was followed (1685) by a "Pindarique" on his coronation. In 1688 he wrote Jus regium Coronae, a learned defence of James's action in dispensing with the penal statutes. He died in obscurity, due perhaps to his political opinions, in 1696. Wilson was the author of four plays, showing a vigorous and learned wit, and a power of character-drawing that place him rather among the followers of Ben Jonson than with the Restoration dramatists.

The Cheats (written in 1662, printed 1664, 1671) was played with great success in 1663. John Lacy found one of his best parts in Scruple, a caricature of a Presbyterian minister of accommodating morality. Andronicus Comnenius (1664), a blank verse tragedy, is based on the story of Andronicus Comnenus as told by Peter Heylin in his Cosmography. It contains a scene between the usurper and the widow of his victim Alexius which follows very closely Shakespeare's treatment of a parallel situation in Richard III. The Projectors (1665), a prose comedy of London life, is, like Molière's The Miser, founded on the Aulularia of Plautus, but there is no evidence that Wilson was acquainted with the French play. Belphegor, or the Marriage of the Devil; a Tragi-coniedy (1690), treats of a theme familiar to Elizabethan drama, but Wilson took the subject from the Belphegor attributed to Machiavelli, and alludes also to Straparola's version in the Notti. He also translated into English Erasmus's Encomium Moriae (1668).
