= Rule a Wife and Have a Wife =

Stage comedy written by John Fletcher

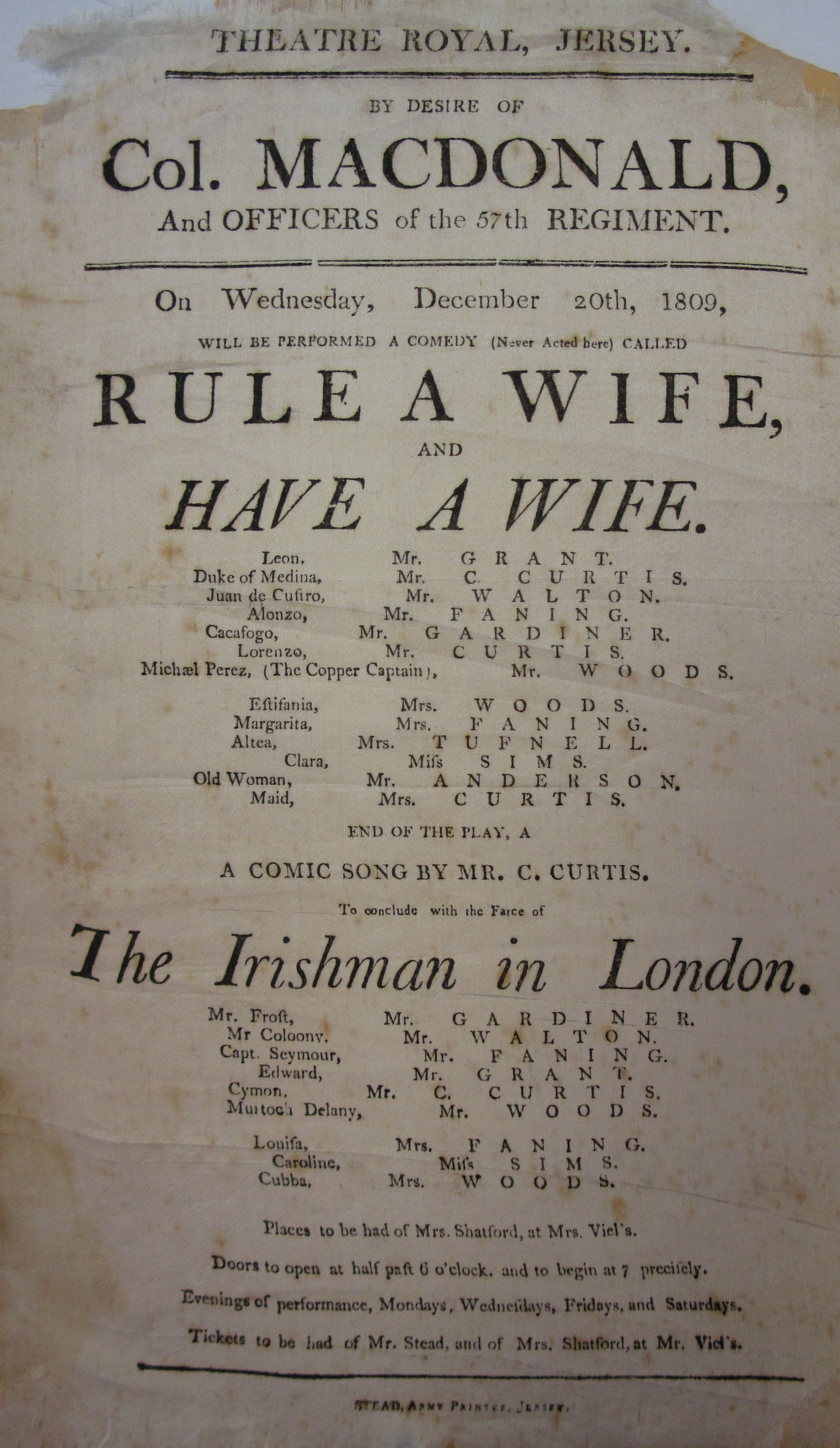
A programme printed on silk for a performance of Rule a Wife and Have a Wife in Jersey on 20 December 1809

Rule a Wife and Have a Wife is a late Jacobean stage comedy written by John Fletcher. It was first performed in 1624 and first published in 1640. It is a comedy with intrigue that tells the story of two couples that get married with false pretenses.

The play was licensed for performance by Sir Henry Herbert, the Master of the Revels, on 19 October 1624. It was performed by the King's Men, who performed it at Court twice in that season. The 1640 quarto was printed at Oxford by Leonard Lichfield, the printer to the University of Oxford. It was later reprinted in the second Beaumont and Fletcher folio of 1679. It was revived in the Restoration era in an adaptation, like many of Fletcher's plays; the revised version was printed in 1697 and repeatedly thereafter, and proved to be among the dramatist's most popular works.

External evidence, including Herbert's entry in his records and the 1640 quarto, assigns the play to Fletcher alone. The play's internal evidence of style and textual preferences confirms Fletcher's solo authorship: "Fletcher's sole responsibility for it has never been questioned." It is the last play he wrote on his own with no co-author.

The play's title refers to an old saying ("Every man can rule a shrew but he that has her"), which suggests that men who offer advice have such easy expertise — but if you actually have such a wife, it's not that easy.

== Song ==
Henry Purcell’s song "There’s not a Swain" is traditionally sung in this play at the beginning of Act 3. The song was published in the April 1694 issue of the Gentleman’s Journal, where it is titled "A Song the Notes by Mr. Henry Purcell The Words fitted to the Tune by N Henley Esq". The tune of the song occurs, without lyrics, as a hornpipe in The Fairy-Queen, Purcell's musical adaptation of Shakespeare's A Midsummer Night's Dream. The song also occurs in Joyful Cuckoldom with a note that it is from the play Rule a Wife and Have a Wife.

== Characters ==
- Michael Perez, the "Copper Captain". "Copper captain" does not occur in the play, but Estifania calls him a "man of copper". "Copper" suggests a less valuable treasure.
- Donna Margarita, wanton heiress and married to Leon. "Margarita" is from the Greek word meaning "pearl"–the play contains puns based on this.
- Estifania, Margarita's maid and Perez' wife
- Leon, Altea's brother
- Don Juan de Castro, a Spanish Colonel
- Duke of Medina, commander of the Spanish Armada
- Sanchio, army officer
- Alonzo, army officer
- Altea, gentlewoman to Margarita
- Cacafogo, a rich usurer. The name is an obscene insult, Spanish for "excreter of fire".
- Lorenzo
- Donna Clara
- Old woman, landlady of the place where Estifania and Perez stay. The part is traditionally played by a man for comedy.
- Maid, old woman's daughter. Also portrayed by a man.
- Servant
- Coachman
- Boy, a boy appears at the start of act 3 to sing a song. The original song is lost. Henry Purcell's song "There's Not a Swain" is a later replacement.

== Setting ==
A Spanish town and a country house.

== Synopsis ==
The first scene of act one begins with Juan and Perez, both officers, conversing about their attempts to recruit soldiers for the war in the Low Countries. They are fed up with war and talk about getting out of war by wedding a wealthy wife. The next scene finds Sanchio and Alonzo considering if they will let themselves be recruited. They discuss the dangers of war and compare it to the dangers of venereal disease. The decide that marriage to a wealthy wife is the best way. The play, with the threat of war, helps to explain why the men will agree to marriage terms that are less than ideal.

Margarita is a wealthy heiress. She marries the soldier, Leon, on condition that he doesn't mind if she has lovers. Leon, it turns out, does mind, and his objections escalate to show that he won't be happy as a cuckold. He manages to get Margarita to tame her erotic desires. To demonstrate that they now trust each other, they join together to abuse and frustrate her next potential lover, the Duke, by making him think that the noise coming from beneath the stairs is the devil coming to claim his soul. It is actually a drunken Cacafogo making the noise.

Meanwhile, in the other part of the story, Margarita's servant, Estifania, weds Perez, the captain. She marries him by pretending that Margarita's wealthy house is hers. Estifania then finds out that Perez is poor — just as Estifania is. However, she pawns Perez's collection of tchotchkes to the usurer Cacafogo, who gives her, in exchange, a fortune, even though they are worthless. This amazes Perez so much that he submits to Estifania.

Both of these two stories use Cacafogo as a way to reconcile the two couples to each other. Perez and Margarita have each found partners who can be exploited to suit their needs, while Estifania and Leon have each succeeded in duping their partners by misrepresenting themselves, "[outfacing] them when the deception is revealed, [forcing] them to surrender, and then [relenting] somewhat for a harmonious resolution". Unlike Shakespeare's play The Taming of the Shrew, which shows a man taming a woman, Fletcher's two plots provide two tamers — a man and a woman. There are two happy marriages at the end — a husband who rules his wife, and a wife who rules her husband — which provides a resolution for the plot, however the skeptical author provides for the audience a generous amount of ambiguity regarding these four.
