= The Country Wife =

1675 play by William Wycherley

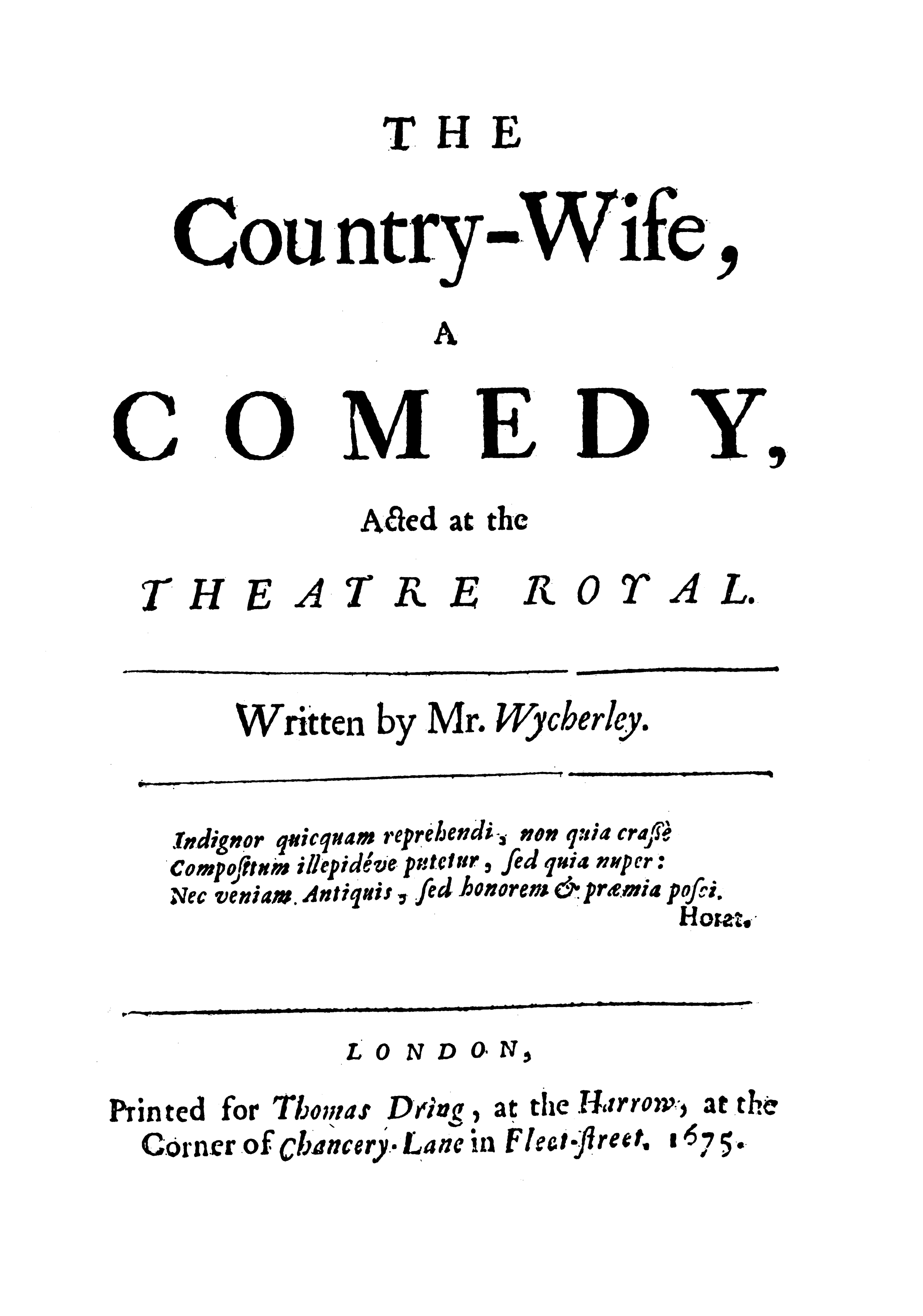
- The first edition of The Country Wife
- Original language: English
- Written by: William Wycherley
- Characters: Mr. Horner; Mr. Harcourt; Mr. Pinchwife; Mrs. Margery Pinchwife; Mrs. Alithea; more...
- Genre: Restoration comedy
- Setting: London

Premiere
- Date: January 1675
- Place: Theatre Royal, Drury Lane

The Country Wife is a Restoration comedy written by William Wycherley and first performed in 1675. A product of the tolerant early Restoration period, the play reflects an aristocratic and anti-Puritan ideology, and was controversial for its sexual explicitness even in its own time. The title contains a lewd pun with regard to the first syllable of "country". It is based on several plays by Molière, with added features that 1670s London audiences demanded: colloquial prose dialogue in place of Molière's verse, a complicated, fast-paced plot tangle, and many sex jokes.

It turns on two indelicate plot devices: a rake's trick of pretending impotence to safely have clandestine affairs with married women, and the arrival in London of an inexperienced young "country wife", with her discovery of the joys of town life, especially the fascinating London men. The implied condition the Rake, Horner, claimed to suffer from was, he said, contracted in France while "dealing with common women". The only cure was to have a surgeon drastically reduce the extent of his manly stature; therefore, he could be no threat to any man's wife.

The scandalous trick and the frank language have for much of the play's history kept it off the stage and out of print. Between 1753 and 1924, The Country Wife was considered too outrageous to be performed at all and was replaced on the stage by David Garrick's cleaned-up and bland version The Country Girl, now a forgotten curiosity. The original play is again a stage favourite today, and is also acclaimed by academic critics, who praise its linguistic energy, sharp social satire, and openness to different interpretations.

== Background ==
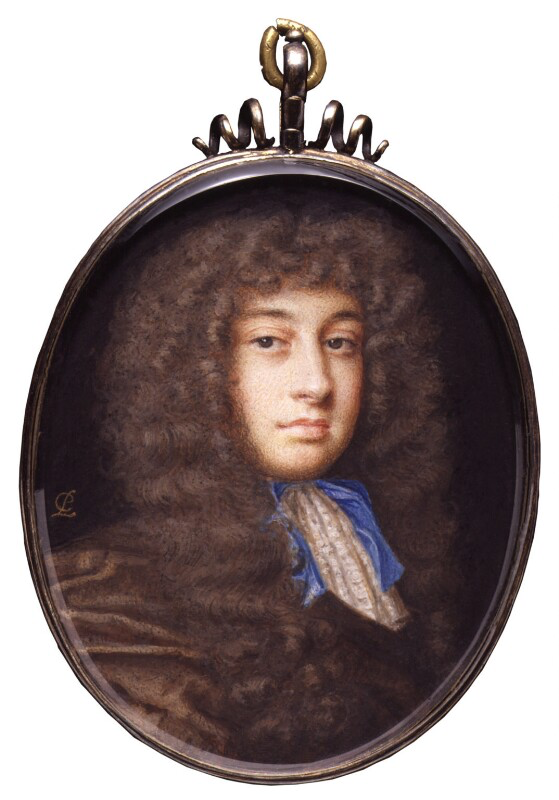
William Wycherley in 1675

After the 18-year Puritan stage ban was lifted at the Restoration of the monarchy in 1660, the theatrical life of London recreated itself quickly and abundantly. During the reign of Charles II (1660–1685), playwrights such as John Dryden, George Etherege, Aphra Behn, and William Wycherley wrote comedies that triumphantly reassert aristocratic dominance and prestige after the years of middle class power during Oliver Cromwell's Commonwealth.

Reflecting the atmosphere of the Court, these plays celebrate a lifestyle of sensual intrigue and conquest, especially conquest that served to humiliate the husbands of the London middle classes and to avenge, in the sensual arena, the marginalisation and exile suffered by royalists under Cromwell. Charles' personal interest in the stage nourished Restoration drama, and his most favoured courtiers were poets, playwrights, and men of wit, such as John Wilmot, Earl of Rochester, Charles Sackville, Earl of Dorset, and William Wycherley.

Wycherley had no title or wealth, but had by 1675 already recommended himself by two well-received comedies and had been admitted to the inner circle, sharing the conversation and, sometimes, the mistresses of Charles, who "was extremely fond of him upon account of his wit". In 1675, at age 35, he created a sensation with The Country Wife, greeted as the bawdiest and wittiest play yet seen on the English stage.

Like Charles II, Wycherley had spent some Commonwealth years in France and become interested in French drama and, throughout his short playwriting career (1671–1676), he borrowed plotlines and techniques from French plays, particularly Molière. In contrast to the French, English audiences of the 1670s had no enthusiasm for structurally simple comedies or for the neoclassical unities of time, place, and action, but demanded fast pace, many complications, and, above all, "variety". To achieve the much denser texture and more complex plotting that pleased in London, Wycherley would combine several source plays to produce bustling action and clashing moods, ranging from farce through paradox to satire.

A Restoration novelty of which Wycherley took advantage was the readiness of public opinion to accept women on stage, for the first time in British history. Audiences were fascinated to see real women reverse the cross-dressing of the Elizabethan boy actors and appear in tight-fitting male outfits in the popular breeches roles, and to hear them match or even outdo the rake heroes in repartee and double entendre. Charles' choice of actresses as mistresses, notably Nell Gwyn, helped keep the interest fresh, and Wycherley plays on this interest in The Country Wife by having Mr. Pinchwife disguise his wife (the eponymous 'country wife') in a boy's outfit. It has also been suggested that he uses the allure of women on display to emphasise in an almost voyeuristic way Margery's provocative innocence, as well as the immodest knowingness of "town" wives like Lady Fidget.

== Plots ==
The Country Wife is more neatly constructed than most Restoration comedies, but is typical of its time and place in having three sources and three plots. The separate plots are interlinked but distinct, each projecting a sharply different mood. They may be schematised as Horner's impotence trick, the married life of Pinchwife and Margery, and the courtship of Harcourt and Alithea.

1. Horner's impotence trick provides the play's organising principle and the turning-points of the action. The trick, to pretend impotence to be allowed where no complete man may go, is distantly based on the classic Roman comedy Eunuchus by Terence. The upper-class town rake Harry Horner begins a campaign to seduce as many respectable ladies as possible, thus cuckolding or "putting horns on" their husbands: Horner's name serves to alert the audience to what is going on.

He spreads a false rumour of his own impotence, to convince married men that he can safely be allowed to socialise with their wives. The rumour is also meant to assist his mass seduction campaign by helping him identify women who are secretly eager for extramarital sex, because those women will react to a supposedly impotent man with tell-tale horror and disgust. This diagnostic trick, which invariably works perfectly, is one of The Country Wife's many running jokes at the expense of hypocritical upper-class women who are rakes at heart.

Horner's ruse of impotence is a success: he has sex with many ladies of virtuous reputation, mostly the wives and daughters of citizens or "cits", i.e. upwardly mobile businessmen and entrepreneurs of the City of London, as opposed to the Town, the aristocratic quarters where Horner and his friends live. Three such ladies appear on stage, usually together: Lady Fidget, her sister-in-law Mrs Dainty Fidget, and her tag-along friend Mrs Squeamish – names that convey a sense of both delicate sensitivity and of physical unease or ticklishness, revealing their obsessions with reputation.

The play is structured as a farce, driven by Horner's secret and by a succession of near-discoveries of the truth, from which he extricates himself by aplomb and good luck. A final threat of exposure comes in the last scene, through the well-meaning frankness of the young country wife Margery Pinchwife. Margery is indignant at the accusations of impotence directed at "poor dear Mr. Horner", which she knows from personal experience to be untrue, and is intent on saying so at the traditional end-of-the-play public gathering of the entire cast.

In a final trickster masterpiece, Horner averts the danger, joining forces with his more sophisticated lovers to persuade the jealous Pinchwife to at least pretend to believe Horner impotent, and his own wife still innocent. Horner never becomes a reformed character, but is assumed to go on reaping the fruits of his planted misinformation, past the last act and beyond.

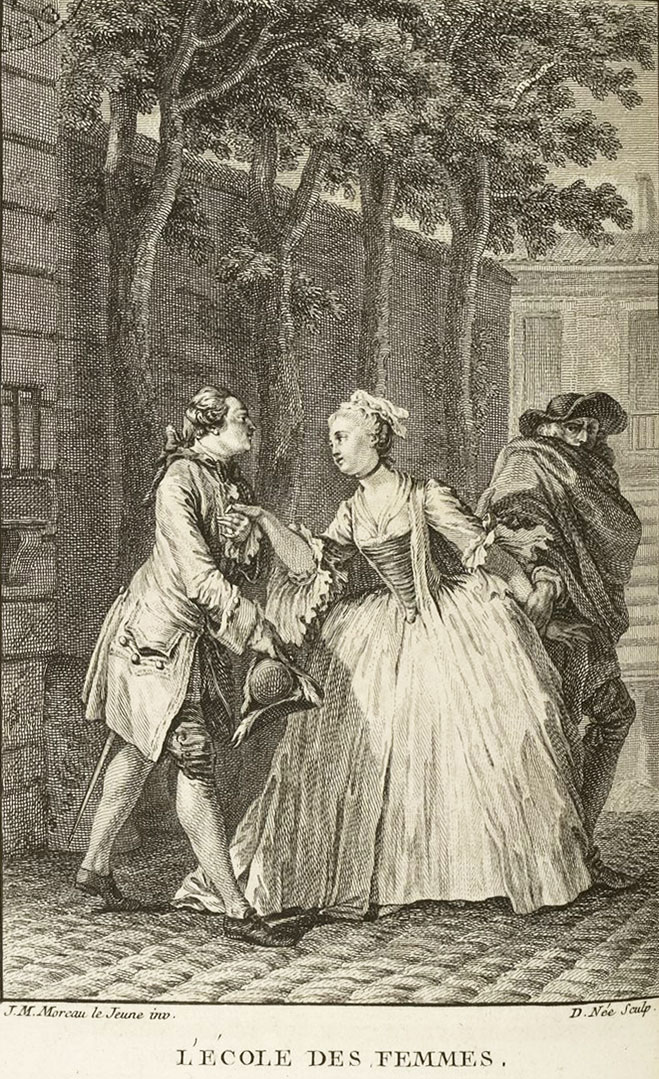
Wycherley used some plot ideas from Molière's L'École des femmes (The School for Wives).

2. The married life of Pinchwife and Margery is based on Molière's The School for Husbands (1661) and The School for Wives (1662). Pinchwife is a middle-aged man who has married a naive country girl in the hope that she will not know to cuckold him. However, Horner teaches her and Margery cuts a swath through the complexities of London upper-class marriage and seduction without even noticing them. Restoration comedies often contrast town and country for humorous effect, and this is one example of it. Both Molière in the School For Wives and Wycherley in The Country Wife get much comic business out of the meeting between, on the one hand, innocent but inquisitive young girls and, on the other hand, the sophisticated 17th-century culture of sexual relations which they encounter.

The difference, which would later make Molière acceptable and Wycherley atrocious to 19th-century critics and theatre producers, is that Molière's Agnes is naturally pure and virtuous, while Margery is just the opposite: enthusiastic about the virile handsomeness of town gallants, rakes, and especially theatre actors, she keeps Pinchwife in a state of continual horror with her plain-spokenness and her interest in sex. A running joke is the way Pinchwife's pathological jealousy always leads him into supplying Margery with the very type of information he wishes her not to have.

3. The courtship of Harcourt and Alithea is a conventional love story without any direct source. By means of persistence and true love, the witty Harcourt, Horner's friend, wins the hand of Pinchwife's sister Alithea, who is, when the play opens, engaged to the shallow fop Sparkish. The delay mechanism of this story is that the upright Alithea holds fast virtuously to her engagement to Sparkish, even while his stupid and cynical character unfolds to her. It is only after Alithea has been caught in a misleadingly compromising situation with Horner, and Sparkish has doubted her virtue while Harcourt has not, that she finally admits her love for Harcourt.

== Key scenes ==
Notorious scenes in the play include "the china scene", a sustained double entendre dialogue mostly heard from off stage, where Horner is purportedly discussing his china collection with two of his lady friends. The husband of Lady Fidget and the grandmother of Mrs. Squeamish are listening front stage and nodding in approval, failing to pick up the double meaning obvious to the audience. Lady Fidget has already explained to her husband that Horner "knows china very well, and has himself very good, but will not let me see it lest I should beg some. But I will find it out, and have what I came for yet" (IV.iii.110). Dialogue such as this made "china" a dirty word in common conversation, Wycherley later claimed.

In another famous scene Lady Fidget's self-styled "virtuous gang" meet up at Horner's lodging to carouse, throw off their public virtue, and behave exactly like male rakes, singing riotous songs and drinking defiant toasts. Finally each of the ladies triumphantly declares that Horner himself is the very lover they have been toasting, and a mayhem of jealousy breaks out as they realise that their friends have also been receiving Horner's favours. But they quickly realise they have no choice but to keep the scandalous secret: "Well then, there's no remedy, sister sharers, let us not fall out, but have a care of our honour" (V.iv.169).

A scene of the Pinchwife plot that combines farce and nightmare is Pinchwife's attempt to force Mrs Pinchwife to write a haughty farewell letter to Horner, using the Freudian threat to "write whore with this penknife in your face" (IV.ii.95). Like all Pinchwife's efforts it misfires, giving Mrs Pinchwife instead an opportunity to send to Horner a letter of praise.

== Themes and analysis ==
=== The dynamics of marriage ===
People marry for the sake of outward appearances, for example Alithea feels that she has no choice but to marry Sparkish because her status in society expects her to. Wives are treated as property as made evident by Pinchwife who locks Margery in her room and forbids her from speaking to men. Sir Jasper's marriage to Lady Fidget is beneficial to his business. Therefore, he treats her as his asset. He constantly asks Horner to "watch" her so that she will have no opportunity to make a cuckold out of him.

There is a struggle for dominance between men and women. As Pinchwife says, '"If we do not cheat women, they’ll cheat us" is the very basis for the chief plot of the play, "which centers upon the exchange of positions of dominance within his own family".'

Pinchwife decides to marry a country woman in the hopes that she will not be clever enough to know how to cheat, but his extremes in preventing her exposure to men leads to his downfall. Only the women are expected to remain faithful to their husbands. As a result, Lady Fidget "uses sex as a means of revenge against their husbands and achieve a kind of moral victory over them by making them what they most fear to be – cuckolds".

=== Horner’s position of power ===
Initially, Horner is confident that he can seek out the married women who are willing to have affairs because they are the ones who do not care about their honour. Horner seems to believe he is in a position of power over the women because their extramarital affair is with him, but his power wanes during the duration of the play. In Act 5, Scene 4, Lady Fidget, Dainty Fidget, and Mistress Squeamish barge into Horner's lodgings despite his protest, conveying "his lower position that alludes to his disguise: a lowly eunuch".

They talk about him as if he was not present, referring to him as a 'beast', 'toad', and eunuch. Cohen says, "As the ladies grow in aggressive self-confidence, Lady Fidget also 'claps him on the back' thereby revealing the altered socio-sexual roles that are now presented". While Horner thinks he is manipulating the women, he has "exhausted his sexual resources and has, in reality, become that impotent and useless object with the world publicly recognises him to be". Horner's true power is not in relationship to the women, but to the men. He shows his dominance over the men he cuckolds.

=== Horner's true intentions toward women ===
Andrew Kaufman claims that although Horner may seem to pretend to despise women because of his pretended state as a eunuch, his hatred toward women is real. When asked whether he enjoys the company of women, "Horner's language in a constant barrage of hostile wit, discharging hostility which cannot, at the moment, be directly expressed. His characteristic action, verbally, is to 'unmask' women."

== First performance ==
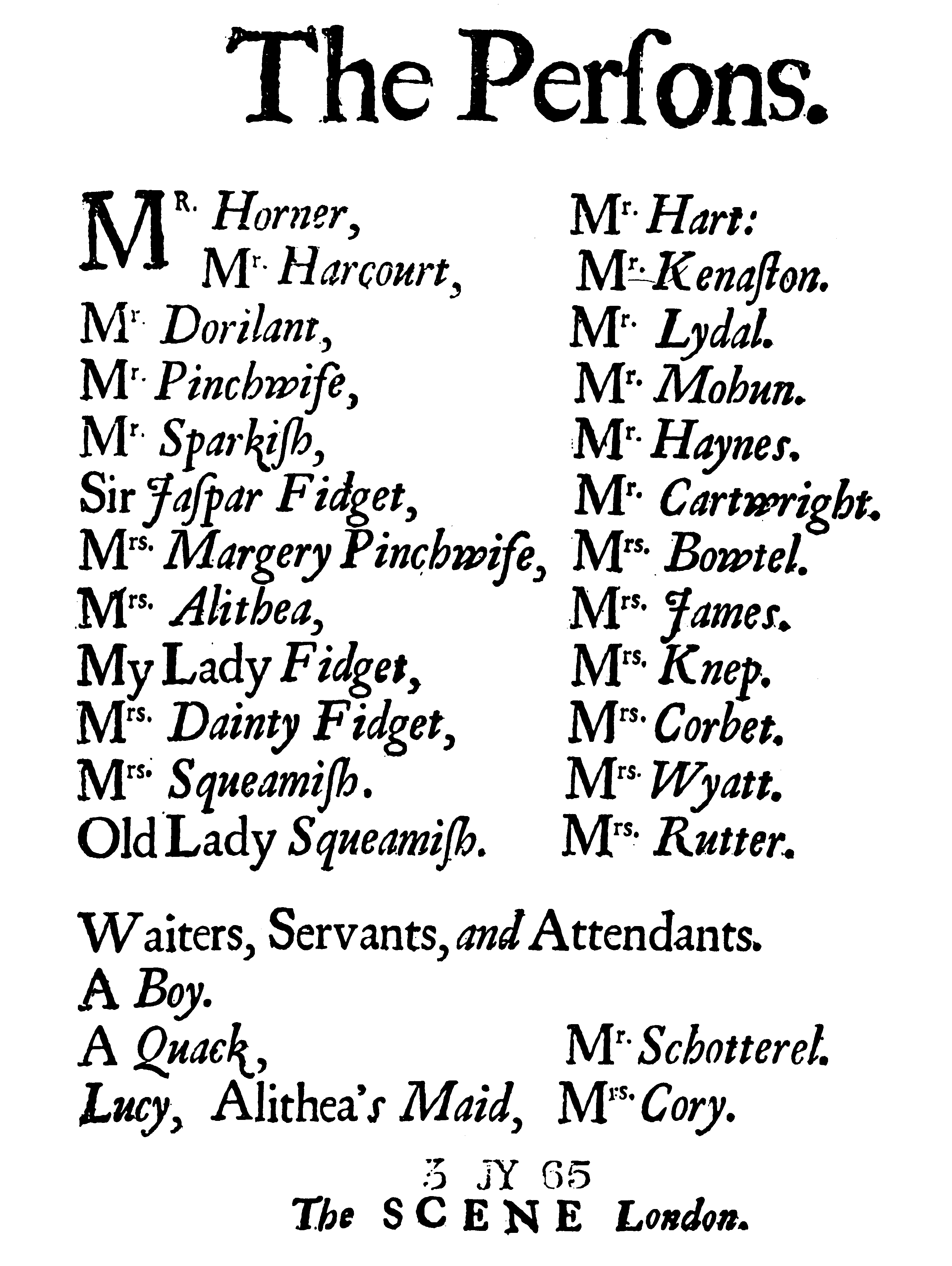
The cast of The Country Wife's original performance

The Country Wife was first performed in January 1675, by the King's Company, at the Theatre Royal, Drury Lane. (Note: The first known performance was on 12 January 1675, but whether this was the premiere is uncertain.) This luxurious playhouse, designed by Christopher Wren, had opened less than a year before and provided a more modern stage to accommodate innovations in scenic design, while still allowing a close connection between actors and the audience.

The original cast was listed in the first edition of The Country Wife, as was standard practice, and modern scholars have suggested that this information throws light on Wycherley's intentions. Wycherley wrote with the original actors in mind, tailoring the roles to their strengths. Also, since the audience consisted mostly of habitual playgoers, authors, and directors could use the associations of an actor's previous repertoire to enrich or undercut a character, effects familiar on television and in the cinema today.

Several of the actors were specialised comedians, notably Joseph Haines who played the false-wit character Sparkish, Alithea's original fiancé. At the outset of his high-profile career as comedian and song-and-dance man, young Haines already had a reputation for eccentricity and dominant stage presence, suggesting that Sparkish is not merely a comic butt for the truewits Horner, Harcourt, and Dorilant to mock, but also a real threat to the romance of Harcourt and Alithea.

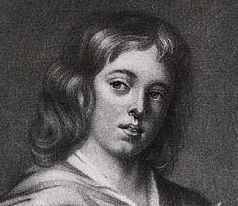
Harcourt: Edward Kynaston played female roles in the 1660s.

Pinchwife was played by the elderly Michael Mohun, who was best known for playing menacing villains, such as Volpone and Iago. Mrs. Pinchwife was Elizabeth Boutell or Bowtel, a young actress who had "a childish look. Her voice was weak, tho' very mellow; she generally acted the young innocent lady whom all the heroes are mad in love with". Boutell's previous recorded roles had in fact all been unmarried as well as innocent girls, and Margery was her first married role.

Matching Boutell and Mohun as a couple would emphasise "her youth and innocence against Mohun's age and violence". The other husband to be cuckolded by Horner, Sir Jaspar Fidget, was played by another elderly actor, William Cartwright, best known for comic parts such as Falstaff. This casting suggests that Sir Jaspar was played as a straightforwardly comic part, while Pinchwife would be "alarming as well as funny".

The male leads Horner and Harcourt were played by the contrasted actors Charles Hart and Edward Kynaston (or Kenaston). The forcefully masculine 45-year-old Hart "was celebrated for superman roles, notably the arrogant, bloodthirsty Almanzor in John Dryden's Conquest of Granada", and also for playing rakish comedy heroes with nonchalance and charisma. Many critics credit the personalities and skills of Hart and Nell Gwyn with creating, as much as any playwright did, the famous flirting/bantering Restoration comedy couple. The beautiful androgynous Kynaston, probably in his early thirties, was a different kind of hero. He had started his career in 1660 as the outstanding Restoration female impersonator – "the prettiest woman in the whole house" – before real women entered the profession in the fall of 1660. The 2004 movie Stage Beauty is loosely based on Kynaston's career.

John Harold Wilson argues that the famously virile stage presence of Hart as Horner must be taken into account when interpreting the play. As personified by Hart, Horner will have won women not so much through clever trickery as "the old-fashioned way", by being "dangerously attractive", and it is only fools like Sir Jaspar Fidget who really believe him harmless. Harcourt/Kynaston, although by 1675 a well-regarded and skilful actor of male roles, would clearly have been overshadowed by Horner/Hart.

The actresses associated with each hero must also have tended to make the Horner plot more striking on the stage than the true-love plot. Horner's primary mistress Lady Fidget, spokeswoman for "the virtuous gang" of secretly sex-hungry town wives, was played by the dynamic Elizabeth Knepp, whom Samuel Pepys declared "the most excellent, mad-humoured thing, and sings the noblest I've ever heard", talents that the famous drinking scene in Horner's lodging seems designed to do justice to.

By contrast, the choice of the bit-part actress Elizabeth James as Alithea would have de-emphasised the Harcourt-Alithea plot. Such historical considerations have made modern critics sceptical of Norman Holland's classic 1959 "right way/wrong way" interpretation of the play, which positions the true-love plot as the most important one.

== Stage history ==
The play had a good initial run, although Horner's trick and the notorious china scene immediately raised offence. Wycherley laughed off such criticisms in his next play, The Plain Dealer (1676), where he has the hypocritical Olivia exclaim that the china scene in The Country Wife "has quite taken away the reputation of poor china itself, and sullied the most innocent and pretty furniture of a lady's chamber". Olivia's sensible cousin Eliza insists that she'll go see The Country Wife anyway: "All this will not put me out of conceit with china, nor the play, which is acted today, or another of the same beastly author's, as you call him, which I'll go see."

Writing himself into The Plain Dealer as the "beastly author" of the china scene, Wycherley seems more amused than repentant. The Country Wife did in fact survive the complaints to become a dependable repertory play from 1675 till the mid-1740s, but by then public taste had changed too much to put up with the sex jokes any longer. Its last eighteenth century performance was on 7 November 1753, followed by a hiatus of 171 years, until the successful Phoenix Society production in 1924 at the Regent Theatre in London. The first-ever American performance of Wycherley's original Country Wife took place in 1931. Wycherley's play is now again a stage classic, with countless professional and amateur performances, an actors' favourite because of the high number of good parts it offers.

== Adaptations ==
=== Expurgated versions ===
The bawdy elements of The Country Wife inspired multiple adaptations to bowdlerise it. The first was by John Lee, whose 1765 revision eliminated the Horner character and cut the play from five acts to two in an attempt to make it "inoffensively humorous". A more successful adaptation was made the following year by David Garrick. He retained the five-act structure, but renamed the characters and called it The Country Girl. Peggy, the renamed Margery, is a virginal country girl who wants to marry against the wishes of her guardian, Jack Moody, the reimagining of Pinchwife.

In this cleaned-up form, The Country Wife continued a shadowy existence into the twentieth century, as Garrick's version was very popular, going through at least twenty editions and reaching the New York stage in 1794. The few modern critics who have read Garrick's version typically dismiss it as "sentimental and boring, where The Country Wife is astringent and provocative".

=== Other adaptations ===
She Shall Have Music, a 1959 musical comedy, mixed The Country Wife with other Restoration comedies such as The School for Scandal and Love for Love. It debuted Off-Broadway on 22 January 1959.

In 1977, the BBC's Play of the Month broadcast a production of The Country Wife with Anthony Andrews as Horner, Helen Mirren as Margery, and Bernard Cribbins as Pinchwife; it was later released on DVD.

The 1975 film Shampoo, with Warren Beatty as the Horner character, is a somewhat distant version of The Country Wife after exactly 300 years, reportedly inspired by the Chichester Festival production of 1969.

In 1992, The Country Wife was adapted into a musical called Lust. Written by the Heather Brothers, it was first performed at the Queens Theatre in Hornchurch in the London Borough of Havering in 1992. It later transferred to the Theatre Royal Haymarket in London's West End, starring Denis Lawson as Horner. Lawson travelled with the production to New York for an Off-Broadway run at the John Houseman Theatre in 1995.

On 13 April 2008, an adaptation was broadcast on BBC Radio 3, directed by David Blount and featuring Ben Miller as Horner, Geoffrey Whitehead as Pinchwife, Clare Corbett as Mrs. Margery Pinchwife, Nigel Anthony as Sir Jasper Fidget, Celia Imrie as Lady Fidget, and Jonathan Keeble as Harcourt.

== Critical reception ==
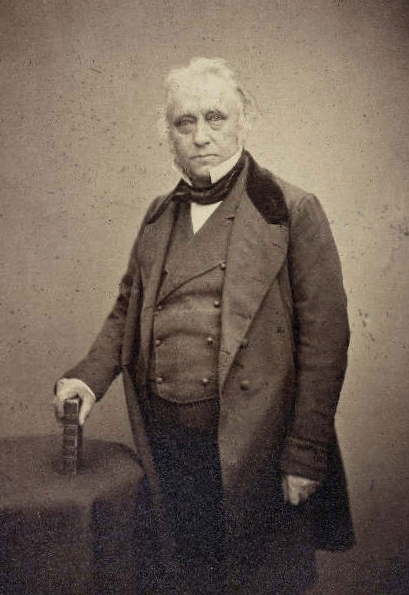
Thomas Macaulay abhorred Wycherley.

From its creation until the mid-20th century, The Country Wife was subject to both aesthetic praise and moral outrage. Many critics through the centuries have acknowledged its linguistic energy and wit, including even Victorians such as Leigh Hunt, who praised its literary quality in a selection of Restoration plays that he published in 1840, itself a daring undertaking, for reputedly "obscene" plays that had been long out of print.

In an influential review of Hunt's edition, Thomas Babington Macaulay swept aside questions of literary merit, claiming with indignation that "Wycherley's indecency is protected against the critics as a skunk is protected against the hunters. It is safe, because it is too filthy to handle and too noisome even to approach." Margery Pinchwife, regarded in Wycherley's own time as a purely comic character, was denounced by Macaulay as a scarlet woman who threw herself into "a licentious intrigue of the lowest and least sentimental kind".

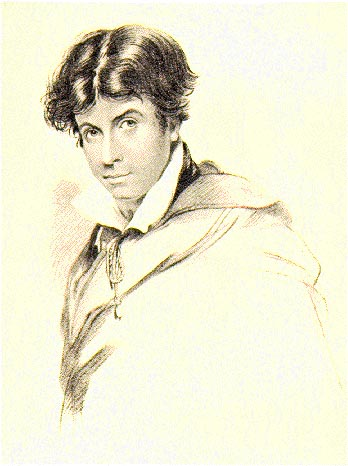
Leigh Hunt admired Wycherley.

It was Macaulay, not Hunt, who set the keynote for the 19th century. The play was impossible equally to stage and to discuss, forgotten and obscure.

Academic critics of the first half of the 20th century continued to approach The Country Wife gingerly, with frequent warnings about its "heartlessness", even as they praised its keen social observation. At this time nobody found it funny, and positive criticism tried to rescue it as satire and social criticism rather than as comedy. Macaulay's "licentious" Mrs. Pinchwife becomes in the 20th century a focus for moral concern: to critics such as Bonamy Dobrée, she is a tragic character, destined to have her naiveté cruelly taken advantage of by the "grim, nightmare figure" of Horner.

== Modern criticism ==
The past fifty years have seen a major change, and academic critics have acknowledged the play as a powerful and original work. Norman Holland's widely influential proposal in 1959 of a "right way/wrong way" reading took Wycherley's morality with innovative seriousness and interpreted the play as presenting two bad kinds of masculinity – Horner's libertinism and Pinchwife's possessiveness – and recommending the golden mean of Harcourt, the true lover, the representative of mutual trust in marriage. A competing milestone approach of the same generation is that of Rose Zimbardo (1965), who discusses the play in generic and historical terms as a fierce social satire.

Both these types of reading have now fallen out of favour; there is little consensus about the meaning of The Country Wife, but its "notorious resistance to interpretation" is having an invigorating rather than damping effect on academic interest. The play's ideological dimension has been emphasised recently. It was written by a courtier for a courtly and aristocratic audience, and Douglas Canfield has pointed to an unusual complication for a courtly play.

Horner's acts of cuckolding aggression are directed not only at disrupting middle-class families of "the City", in the usual way of the aristocratic Restoration rake, but also at his own, upper, class, the inhabitants of "the Town" – the new and fashionable quarters (the future West End) that had sprung up west of the medieval City walls after the Great Fire of London in 1666. The courtier code proposed by Wycherley is of a sexual game.

Eve Kosofsky Sedgwick argued in Between Men that the game is played not between men and women, but between men by means of women, who are merely the "conduits" of homosocial desire between men. The hierarchy of wits meant that the wittiest and most virile man would win at the game. Thus Horner, as Canfield puts it, "represents not just class superiority, but that subset of class represented by the Town wits, a privileged minority that ... is the jet set identified with the Town and the Court as the loci of real power in the kingdom."

The aggressive attack mounted in the china scene against the class and the generation by which Wycherley was patronised with the expectation that he would defend it (against Sir Jaspar Fidget and Lady Fidget), suggests Canfield, would only let an audience of that class laugh comfortably if Horner were punished by actual impotence in the end, which he is not. "When the play concludes with no poetical justice that makes Horner really impotent", writes Canfield, "leaving him instead potent and still on the make, the audience laughs at its own expense: the women of quality nervously because they have been misogynistically slandered; the men of quality nervously because at some level they recognize that class solidarity is just a pleasing fiction."

== Awards and nominations ==
=== 1957 Broadway revival ===
Year	Award	Category	Nominee	Result
1958	Tony Award	Best Costume Design in a Play	Motley	Nominated
1958	Theatre World Award		Richard Easton	Won
