= John Leanerd =

British playwright (fl. 1679)

John Leanerd (fl. 1679) was a British playwright who is known for plagiarising.

== Works ==
- The Country Innocence; or, the Chambermaid turn'd Quaker, London, a comedy acted at the London Theatre Royal in Lent, 1677, by the younger members of the company. It was The Country Girl (1647, sometimes attributed to Anthony Brewer) under a new title.
- The Rambling Justice; or, the Jealous Husbands, with the Humours of Sir John Twiford, performed at the same theatre; the incidents are mostly borrowed from Thomas Middleton's More Dissemblers Besides Women, 1657.

To Leanerd has also been ascribed a comedy The Counterfeits, London, 1679, acted at the Duke's Theatre in 1678. The plot was taken from a translated Spanish novel The Trepanner Trepanned. Colley Cibber as author of She Would and She Would Not either based his play on the same novel, or else borrowed extensively from the comedy.

== Notes ==
Attribution

This article incorporates text from a publication now in the public domain: Lee, Sidney, ed. (1892). "Leanerd, John". Dictionary of National Biography. Vol. 32. London: Smith, Elder & Co.
