= William Wycherley =

English playwright (1641–1716)

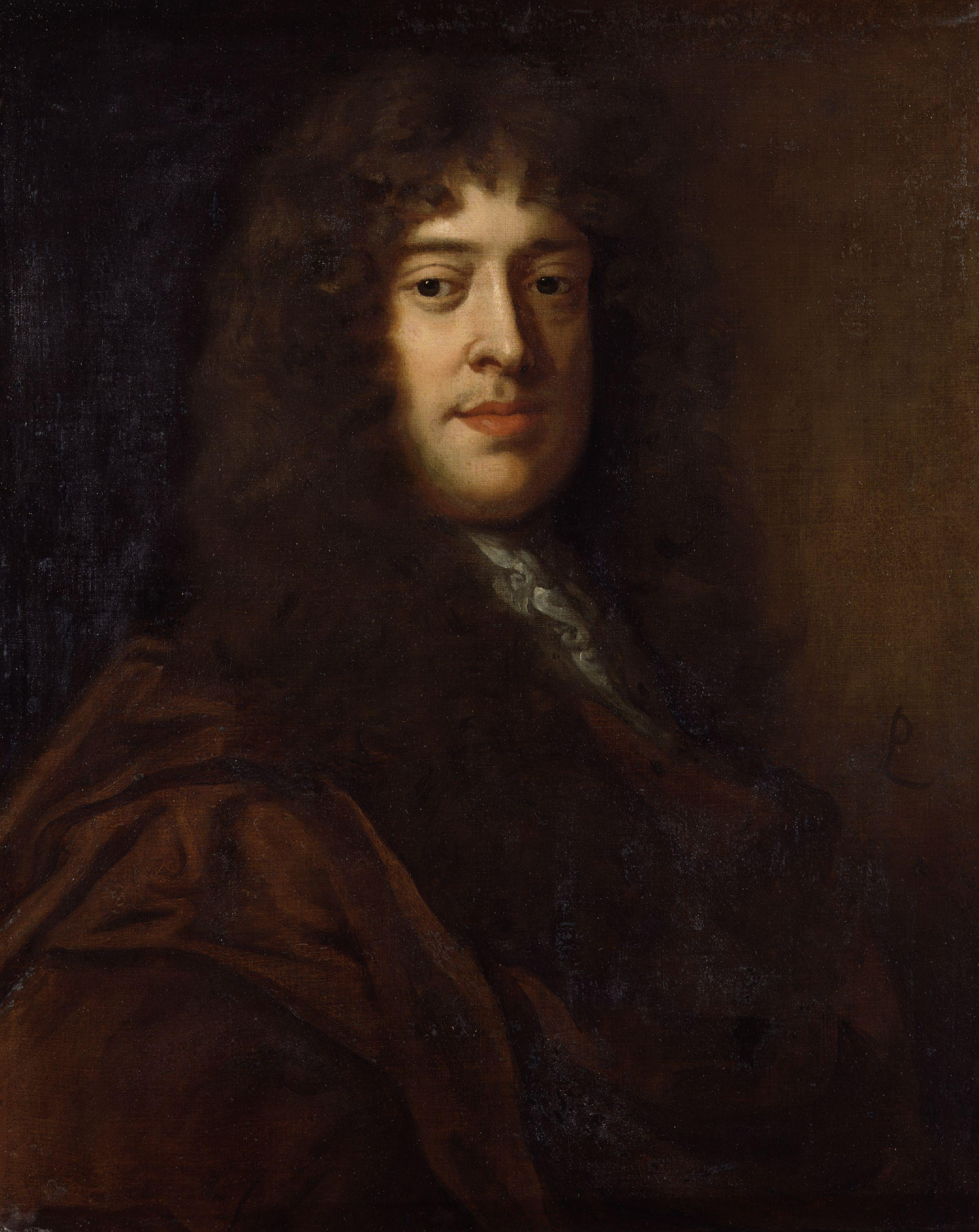
- Portrait by Sir Peter Lely, c. 1668
- Born: 1641; Clive, Shropshire
- Died: 1 January 1716 (aged 74); London, England
- Occupations: poet; playwright
- Writing career
- Notable works: The Country Wife; The Plain Dealer
- Literary movement: Classicism

William Wycherley (/wɪtʃərˈliː/ witch-ər-LEE; April 1641 – 1 January 1716) was an English playwright best known for writing the plays The Country Wife (1675) and The Plain Dealer (1676).

== Early life ==
Wycherley was born at Clive near Shrewsbury, Shropshire, at a house called Clive Hall, although his birthplace has also been said (by Lionel Cust) to be Trench Farm to the north near Wem, later the birthplace of another writer, John Ireland, who was said to have been adopted by Wycherley's widow following the death of Ireland's parents. He was baptised on 8 April 1641, at Whitchurch, Hampshire. He was the son of Daniel Wycherley (1617–1697) and his wife Bethia, daughter of William Shrimpton. His family was settled on a moderate estate of about £600 a year, and his father was in the business service of the Marquess of Winchester. Wycherley lived during much of his childhood at Trench Farm, one of his paternal family's Shropshire properties, and also probably in his earliest years at Whitchurch Farm, which his father leased until 1649, in Hampshire.

After being educated at home, he spent three years of his adolescence in France, where he was sent to be educated at the age of fifteen. While in France, Wycherley converted to Roman Catholicism. He returned to England shortly before the restoration of King Charles II and lived at The Queen's College, Oxford, where Thomas Barlow was provost. Under Barlow's influence, Wycherley returned to the Church of England. Wycherley left Oxford and took up residence at the Inner Temple, which he initially entered in October 1659, but he gave little attention to studying law and ceased to live there after 1670. He served in Ireland in 1662 as a soldier with the Earl of Ancram's Regiment of Guards. During 1664–65 he was attached on a diplomatic mission by Sir Richard Fanshawe in Madrid, and he claimed to have fought in the Second Anglo-Dutch War in 1665.

== First two plays and Third Anglo-Dutch War ==
Wycherley's play, Love in a Wood, was produced in early 1671 at the Theatre Royal, Drury Lane. It was published the following year. Wycherley claimed to have written the play at the age of nineteen (in 1660 or 1661) before going to Oxford, but Thomas Macaulay points to the allusions in the play to gentlemen's periwigs, to guineas, to the vests that King Charles II ordered to be worn at court, to the Great Fire of London, etc. as showing that the comedy could not have been written the year before Wycherley went to Oxford.

Wycherley was commissioned on 19 June 1672 during the Third Anglo-Dutch War as a captain lieutenant in a company of the English Army's 4th (The Holland) Regiment raised by the Duke of Buckingham. He was sent on an expedition that ended with his company being stationed on the Isle of Wight to counter potential Dutch landings there in July 1673. Wycherley was promoted to the rank of captain on 26 February 1674, but resigned his commission on 6 March and returned home. His time in the Army was plagued by difficulties obtaining pay and supplies for his troops, some of whom after his departure complained of "ill-usage" at Wycherley's hands.

== Last two plays ==
The Country Wife was produced in 1672 or 1673 and published in 1675. The play reflects an aristocratic and anti-Puritan ideology and was controversial for its sexual explicitness. The title itself contains a lewd pun on the first syllable of "country". The play is based on several plays by Molière, with additions to suit the tastes of 1670s London audiences: colloquial prose dialogue in place of Molière's verse, a complicated, fast-paced plot tangle, and many sex jokes. It uses two plot devices: a rake's trick of pretending impotence to avoid suspicion while having clandestine affairs with married women, and the arrival in London of an inexperienced young "country wife", with her discovery of the joys of town life, especially London men.

The Plain Dealer, based on Molière's Le Misanthrope, was highly praised by John Dryden and John Dennis, though it was also condemned for its obscenity by many. The title character is Captain Manly, a sailor who doubts the motives of everyone he meets except for his sweetheart, Olivia, and his friend, Vernish. When Olivia jilts him and marries Vernish, Captain Manly attempts to gain revenge by sending a pageboy (who, unknown to him, is a girl in disguise and is in love with him) to seduce Olivia. When the truth of the page's identity is discovered, Manly marries her instead.

Wycherley had no title or wealth, but by 1675 he had been admitted to the inner court circle, sharing the conversation and sometimes the mistresses of King Charles II, who "was extremely fond of him upon account of his wit". In 1679, Charles engaged Wycherley as tutor for his bastard son, the Duke of Richmond, born in 1672.

== First marriage ==
In the spring of 1678, while in a bookshop at Tunbridge Wells, Wycherley heard The Plain Dealer asked for by the Countess of Drogheda (Letitia Isabella Robartes, eldest daughter of the 1st Earl of Radnor and widow of the 2nd Earl of Drogheda). They married on 29 September 1679, in secret because Wycherley feared losing his income from the King's patronage. The King was displeased when he learned of Wycherley's secret marriage and ended his tutorship of the Duke of Richmond.

The Countess died by July 1685, leaving Wycherley her fortune. However, the title to her property was disputed and the costs of the litigation were so heavy that Wycherley's father was either unable or unwilling to financially aid him. He was imprisoned in Fleet Prison as a debtor until he was released by King James II, who paid off Wycherley's execution creditor and provided Wycherley a pension of £200 a year. In 1689, Wycherley fled back to Shropshire after the accession of King William III displaced James II. He feuded with his father over his debts but eventually achieved a settlement to pay off £1,000 of them, enabling him to return to London.

== Later life ==
Wycherley still had other debts, and they were not paid off even after he succeeded to a life estate in the family property at Clive after his father's death in 1697. He took a mortgage of £1000 from lands there to pay further debts and continued to live in London, only calling on the estate to collect rents.

At the age of 74, in poor health, and by special licence dated 20 December 1715, he married young Elizabeth Jackson, who was the mistress of Wycherley's cousin, Thomas Shrimpton, who had collusively and somewhat coercively introduced her to Wycherley. Wycherley was said to have married in order to spite his nephew, the next in succession, knowing that he would shortly die and that the jointure would impoverish the estate. After receiving last rites as an acknowledged Roman Catholic, (which he professed to be in letter to the young Alexander Pope) Wycherley died at his lodging house in Bow Street, London, in the early hours of 1 January 1716, and was buried in the vault of St. Paul's, Covent Garden, on 5 January.

There was a lawsuit by Wycherley's nephew to overturn the validity of the marriage, but the marriage was upheld on the grounds that Wycherley was sane at the time. Three months after Wycherley's death, Elizabeth Jackson married Thomas Shrimpton.

== Legacy ==
The language and content of Wycherley's plays led to the restriction of their publication and performance for nearly two centuries, and over most of that time the original versions were replaced with bowdlerised versions, such as an adaptation of The Plain Dealer by Isaac Bickerstaffe and a version of The Country Girl by David Garrick.

The Oxford English Dictionary cites Wycherley as the first user of the phrase "happy-go-lucky", in 1672.

Voltaire was a great admirer of Wycherley's plays and once said of them, "Il semble que les Anglais prennent trop de liberté et que les Françaises n'en prennent pas assez" (It seems that the Englishmen take too much liberty and the Frenchwomen don't take enough).

In 1952, composer Malcolm Arnold and librettist Joe Mandoza turned The Gentleman Dancing Master into a one-act opera called The Dancing Master. It was originally intended as a television opera, but was rejected as "too racy" and had its first fully staged performance in 2015.
