= Cardell Goodman =

English actor, adventurer, and Jacobite conspirator

Cardell Goodman (also Cardonell) (1649?–1699) was an English actor and adventurer, now known as a Jacobite conspirator.

== Early life ==
He was son of a clergyman of the same name at one time in Shaftesbury, Dorset, and on 18 March 1651 removed from the benefice of Freshwater, Isle of Wight, by order of the council of state. The son went to St. John's College, Cambridge, and proceeded B.A. in 1670. According to his own account, as related by Colley Cibber, he was expelled from the university as one of the hot-heads who cut and defaced a picture of the Duke of Monmouth, then chancellor of the university.

Goodman was then in London, and became one of the pages of the back-staircase to Charles II, but after five years' service he was dismissed for negligence. He inherited £2,000 on his father's death, but squandered it.

== Actor ==
Goodman then attached himself to the king's company at Drury Lane Theatre, and made a stage appearance as Polysperchon in the Rival Queens, or Alexander the Great, 1677. Here, according to Cibber, he made his reputation, and he is mentioned by John Downes as taking the parts of Alexas in John Dryden's All for Love, Pharnaces in Mithridates, king of Pontus, by Nathaniel Lee, acted in 1678, and Valentinian in the tragedy of Valentinian, adapted by the Earl of Rochester from Beaumont and Fletcher's play, and performed at Drury Lane in 1685.

The characters in which he won major success were Julius Cæsar and Alexander the Great. Cibber mentions praise he gave Goodman when he was playing the part of the chaplain in Thomas Otway's Orphan. In 1682, when a fusion took place between the duke's and the king's company, he supported Michael Mohun in opposing the united actors, although he joined them about three years later.

== Later life ==
As a proof of his poverty Cibber relates that Philip Griffin and "Scum" Goodman—"as he was styled by his enemies"—were driven to share a bed and shirt, and that a duel was fought on Goodman's appropriating the common clothing out of his turn. He also committed a highway robbery. He was condemned, but speedily pardoned by James II, and returned to the stage a hero.

His latter years were rendered more affluent by his becoming the lover of the Duchess of Cleveland, but he was detected in an attempt to poison two of her children, brought to trial for a misdemeanour, and fined heavily. In 1688 he withdrew from the stage, and became a gamester, an expert at ombre.

Out of gratitude to King James for sparing his life, Goodman became a Jacobite, and on the death of Queen Mary II was connected with the Fenwick–Charnock plot to kill William III (1695–96). When the scheme was discovered, Goodman, who was committed to the Gatehouse Prison, was offered a free pardon if he would inform against Sir John Fenwick. Fenwick's friends sought him out at the "Fleece" in Covent Garden, and at the "Dog" in Drury Lane.

Goodman eventually agreed to accept £500 a year with a residence abroad. He escaped to France, and died there of a fever in 1699, aged about 50.

== Nickname ==
The opprobrious nickname "Scum" was popularised by Thomas Babington Macaulay.

== Notes ==
Attribution

This article incorporates text from a publication now in the public domain: "Goodman, Cardell". Dictionary of National Biography. London: Smith, Elder & Co. 1885–1900.
