= Nathaniel Lee =

17th-century English dramatist

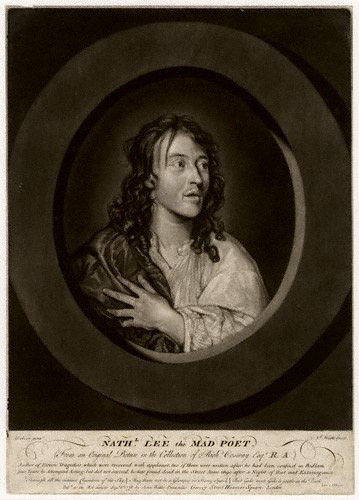
Nathaniel Lee

Nathaniel Lee (c. 1653 – 6 May 1692) was an English dramatist. He was the son of Dr Richard Lee, a Presbyterian clergyman who was rector of Hatfield and held many preferments under the Commonwealth; Dr Lee was chaplain to George Monck, afterwards Duke of Albemarle, but after the Restoration he conformed to the Church of England, and withdrew his approval for Charles I's execution.

Lee was educated at Westminster School (though some sources say Charterhouse School), and at Trinity College, Cambridge, taking his B.A. degree in 1668. Coming to London, perhaps under the patronage of George Villiers, 2nd Duke of Buckingham, he tried to earn his living as an actor, but acute stage fright made this impossible. His earliest play, Nero, Emperor of Rome, was acted in 1675 at Drury Lane. Two tragedies written in rhymed heroic couplets, in imitation of John Dryden, followed in 1676: Sophonisba, or Hannibal's Overthrow and Gloriana, or the Court of Augustus Caesar. Both are extravagant in design and treatment.

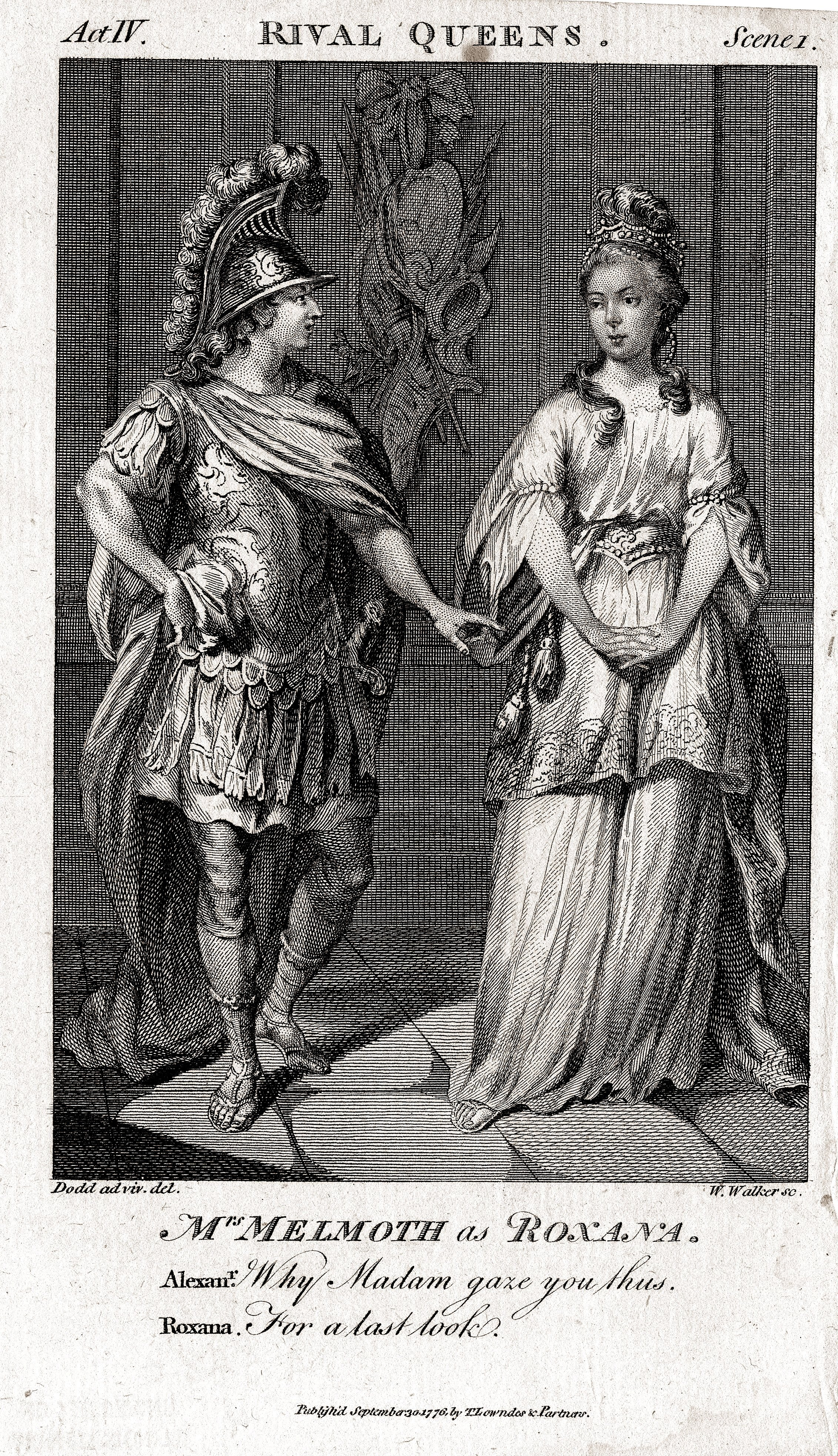
Charlotte Melmoth as Roxana in Lee's The Rival Queens (Drury Lane Theatre, February 1777)

Lee's reputation was made in 1677 with a blank verse tragedy, The Rival Queens, or the Death of Alexander the Great. The play, which deals with the jealousy of Alexander's first wife, Roxana, for his second wife, Statira, was a favourite on the English stage right up to the days of Edmund Kean. Lee followed this with Mithridates, King of Pontus (acted 1678); Theodosius, or the Force of Love (acted 1680); and Caesar Borgia (acted 1680), an imitation of the worst blood and thunder Elizabethan tragedies. Lee was also named as a collaborator with Dryden in an adaptation of Oedipus (1679). The Princess of Cleve (1681) is an adaptation of Madame de La Fayette's 1678 novel of the same name. The Massacre of Paris was written about this time but not published until 1690.

Lucius Junius Brutus (acted 1681) gave offence at court. The play was suppressed after its third representation for some lines on Tarquin's character that were taken to be a reflection on King Charles II. He therefore joined Dryden in The Duke of Guise (1683), a play which directly advocated the Tory point of view. In it part of the Massacre of Paris was incorporated. Lee was now thirty, and had already achieved a considerable reputation. Constantine the Great (acted 1683) followed.

He had lived in the dissipated society of John Wilmot, Earl of Rochester, and his associates, and imitated their excesses. As he grew more disreputable, his patrons neglected him, and by 1684 his mind was allegedly completely unhinged. He spent five years in the notorious Bedlam Hospital. He lamented his situation with the following missive: "They called me mad, and I called them mad, and damn them, they outvoted me". He recovered and was released.

Lee died in a drunken fit in 1692. He was buried on 6 May in St. Clement Danes, Strand.

Lee's Dramatic Works were published in 1734. In spite of their extravagance, they contain many passages of great beauty. Copies of Lee's books remain sought after in bibliographic circles.

== Plays ==
Dates are of first production.

- The Tragedy of Nero, Emperour of Rome — 1674
- Sophonisba, or Hannibal's Overthrow — 30 April 1675
- Gloriana, or the Court of Augustus Caesar — January 1675/6
- The Rival Queens, or the Death of Alexander the Great — March 1676/7
- Mithridates, King of Pontus: A Tragedy — March 1677/8
- Oedipus: A Tragedy (with John Dryden) — 1678 or 1679
- Caesar Borgia; Son of Pope Alexander the Sixth — 1679 or 1680
- The Princess of Cleve — c. 1680
- Theodosius: or, The Force of Love — c. 1680
- Lucius Junius Brutus; Father of his Country — December 1680
- The Duke of Guise. A Tragedy (with John Dryden) — 30 November 1682
- Constantine the Great; A Tragedy — November 1683
- The Massacre of Paris — 7 November 1689
