= 1663 in literature =

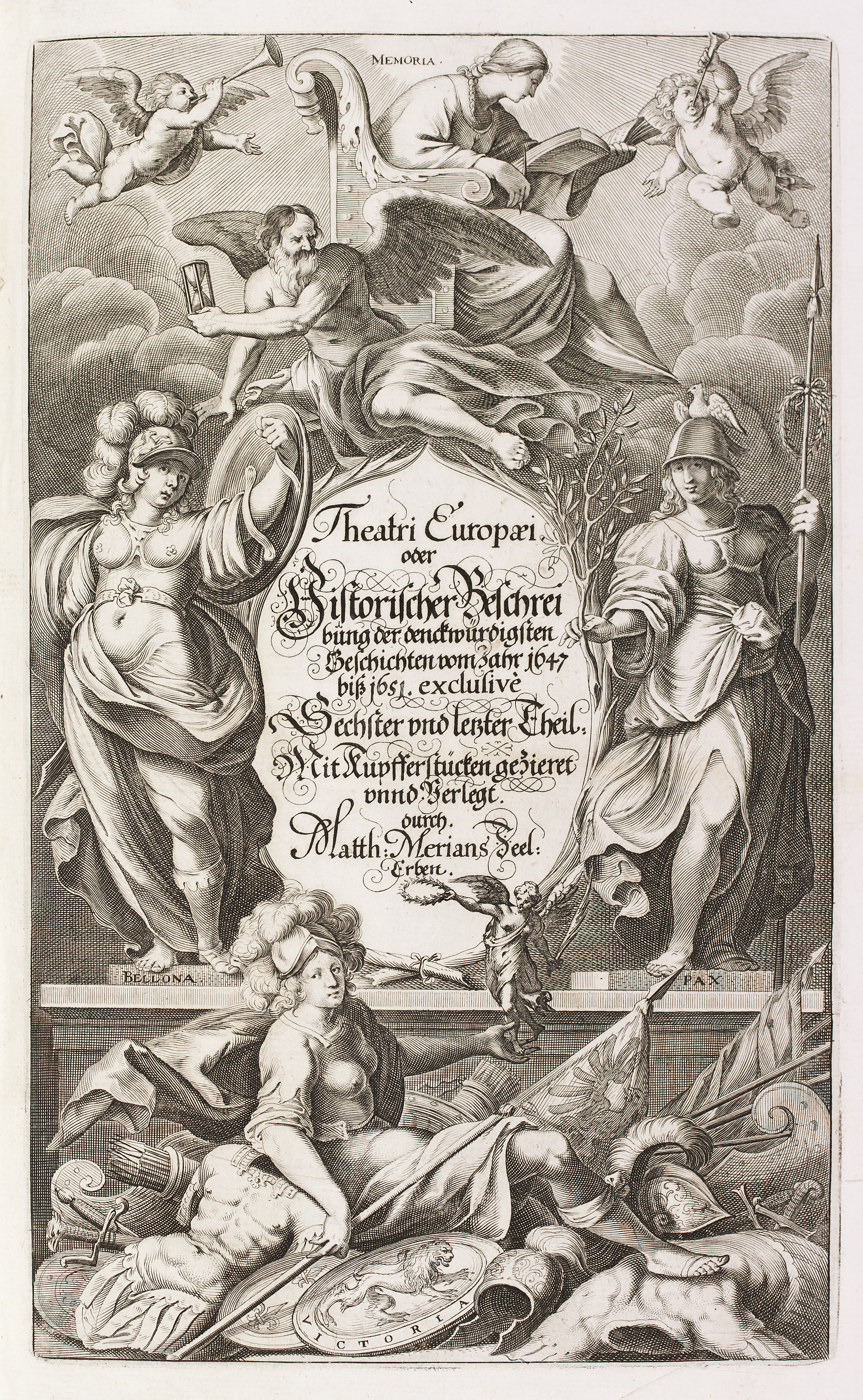
The title page of Johann Schröder's book "Boken Theatri Europæi" released in 1663

This article contains information about the literary events and publications of 1663.

== Events ==
- February
  - The Académie des inscriptions et belles-lettres (Academy of the Humanities) is founded in Paris.
  - Katherine Philips' translation of Pierre Corneille's Pompée is produced successfully at the Theatre Royal, Dublin (Smock Alley Theatre) in Ireland, as the first rhymed version of a French tragedy in English and the first English play written by a woman to be performed on a professional stage. It is published in Dublin and London later in the year.
  - London printer John Twyn is hanged, drawn and quartered at Tyburn for producing the anonymous A Treatise of the Execution of Justice, justifying civil rebellion.
- February 24 – John Milton marries his third wife, Elizabeth Minshull, 31 years his junior, at St Mary Aldermary in the City of London.
- May 7 – The King's Company inaugurates its new theatre, the first Theatre Royal, Drury Lane, London, with a revival of Fletcher's The Humorous Lieutenant. The play succeeds and runs for twelve nights in a row, unusual under the repertory system of the time.
- August – The Playhouse to Be Let, an anthology of work by Sir William Davenant, is performed at Lincoln's Inn Fields in London.
- December 1 – John Dryden marries Elizabeth, sister of Sir Robert Howard. Dryden and John Aubrey become Fellows of the Royal Society in the same year.
- unknown dates
  - In the Electorate of Bavaria, a legal deposit law requires copies of all newly printed books to be deposited in the Bavarian State Library in Munich.
  - In England, Roger L'Estrange is appointed Surveyor of the Imprimery and Printing Presses and licenser of the press.
  - The Third Folio of Shakespeare's plays is published by Philip Chetwinde in London, adding Pericles and six plays of Shakespeare Apocrypha to the canon.
  - Publication takes place at Cambridge in the Massachusetts Bay Colony of the "Eliot Indian Bible" (Mamusse Wunneetupanatamwe Up-Biblum God) makes it the first complete Bible published in the Americas. The translation by the English-born Puritan missionary John Eliot of the Geneva Bible from English into the Massachusett language (Natic or Wômpanâak) variety of the Algonquian languages is printed by Samuel Green.

== New books ==
=== Prose ===
- Molière – La Critique de l'école des femmes
- John Spencer – A Discourse concerning Prodigies, wherein the vanety of Presages by them is reprehended, and their true and proper Ends asserted and vindicated
- Peder Syv - Nogle Betenkninger om det Cimbriske Sprog

=== Drama ===
- Anonymous – The Wandering Whores' Complaint for Want of Trading (published)
- Miguel de Barrios – El Espanjol de Oran
- Roger Boyle, 1st Earl of Orrery – The General
- George Villiers, Duke of Buckingham (after Jonson) – Sir Politic Would-Be
- Pedro Calderón de la Barca
  - El divino Orfeo
  - El mágico prodigioso
- Henry Cary – The Marriage Night
- Abraham Cowley – The Cutter of Coleman Street
- William Davenant
  - The Playhouse to Be Let (performed)
  - The Siege of Rhodes Part 2 (published)
- John Dryden – The Wild Gallant
- Andreas Gryphius
  - Absurda Comica, oder Herr Peter Squentz
  - Papinianus
- Edward Howard – The Usurper (first performance; published 1667)
- James Howard – The English Monsieur
- Sir Robert Howard – The Committee
- "T. P." – A Witty Combat, or the Female Victor (once attributed to Thomas Porter)
- Thomas Porter – The Villain
- Richard Rhodes – Flora's Vagaries
- Sir Robert Stapylton
  - The Stepmother
  - The Slighted Maid
- Sir Samuel Tuke – The Adventures of Five Hours (adapted from Antonio Coello's Los empeños de seis horas)

=== Poetry ===
- Abraham Cowley – Verses Upon Several Occasions
- Sir William Davenant – Poem, to the King’s most sacred Majesty

== Births ==
- February 12 – Cotton Mather, New England Puritan author and minister (died 1728)
- March 6 – Francis Atterbury, English man of letters and bishop (died 1732
- March 22 – August Hermann Francke, German theologian (died 1727)
- May 20 – William Bradford, American printer (died 1752)
- Unknown dates
  - William King, English poet (died 1712)
  - George Stepney, English poet (died 1707)
- Probable year of birth – Delarivier Manley, English novelist, playwright and pamphleteer (died 1724)

== Deaths ==
- April 5 – John Norton, English religious writer (born 1606)
- April 17 – David Questiers, Dutch poet (born 1623)
- July 14 – Elizabeth Egerton, countess of Bridgwater, English essayist (childbirth, born 1626)
- October 31 – Théophile Raynaud, French theologian (born 1583)
- December 5 – Severo Bonini, Italian music writer (born 1582)
- Unknown date – Claude de Bourdeille, comte de Montrésor, French memoirist (born c. 1606)
