= John Young (stage actor) =

English actor

John Young was an English stage actor of the seventeenth century. He was a member of the Duke's Company during the Restoration Era, appearing at Lincoln's Inn Fields and then at the Dorset Garden Theatre when the company relocated. Not much is known about his background. He was repeatedly in debt during his acting career. In 1667 he stood in for Thomas Betterton after he fell ill during the run of Macbeth appearing as the title role. The diarist Samuel Pepys described him as "a bad actor at best".

== Selected roles ==
- Cardinal in The Duchess of Malfi by John Webster (1662)
- Bontefeu in The Villain by Thomas Porter (1663)
- Octavio in The Adventures of Five Hours by Samuel Tuke (1663)
- Corbulo in The Slighted Maid by Robert Stapylton (1663)
- Adolph in The Stepmother by Robert Stapylton (1663)
- Arcon in The Rivals by William Davenant (1664)
- Cardinal of Veradium in Mustapha by Roger Boyle (1665)
- Lord Dartmouth in Sir Martin Mar-all by John Dryden (1667)
- Macbeth in Macbeth by William Shakespeare (1667)
- Freeman in She Would If She Could by George Etherege (1668)
- Bassanes in The Women's Conquest by Edward Howard (1670)
- Alcander in The Forc'd Marriage by Aphra Behn (1670)
- Theramnes in Cambyses, King Of Persia by Elkanah Settle (1671)
- Demetrius in Juliana by John Crowne (1671)
- Ascanio in Charles VIII of France by John Crowne (1671)
- Polidor in The Six Days' Adventure by Edward Howard (1671)
- Don Francisco in The Fatal Jealousy by Henry Nevil Payne (1672)

== Bibliography ==
- Highfill, Philip H, Burnim, Kalman A. & Langhans, Edward A. A Biographical Dictionary of Actors, Actresses, Musicians, Dancers, Managers & Other Stage Personnel in London, 1660–1800: W. West to Zwingman. SIU Press, 1993.
- Roberts, David. Thomas Betterton: The Greatest Actor of the Restoration Stage. Cambridge University Press, 2010.
