= Jane Long (actress) =

English actress

Jane Long was an English stage actor of the seventeenth century. She was recruited into the Duke's Company after the theatres were repopened following the Restoration and became a noted comedienne, at a time when the Restoration comedy genre was flourishing.

== Selected roles ==
- Laughing Jane in The Cutter of Coleman Street by Abraham Cowley (1661)
- Flora in The Adventures of Five Hours by Samuel Tuke (1663)
- Diacelia in The Slighted Maid by Robert Stapylton (1663)
- Brianella in The Stepmother by Robert Stapylton (1663)
- Widow in The Comical Revenge by George Etheredge (1664)
- Leucippe in The Rivals by William Davenant (1664)
- Zarma in Mustapha by Roger Boyle (1665)
- Mandanda in The Women's Conquest by Edward Howard (1670)
- Mrs Brittle in The Amorous Widow by Thomas Betterton (1670)
- Crispina in The Six Days' Adventure by Edward Howard (1671)
- Fickle in The Town Shifts by Edward Revet (1671)
- Paulina in Juliana by John Crowne (1671)
- Osiris in Cambyses, King Of Persia by Elkanah Settle (1671)
- Betty Rash in The Morning Ramble by Henry Nevil Payne (1673)

== Bibliography ==
- Howe, Elizabeth. The First English Actresses: Women and Drama, 1660–1700. Cambridge University Press, 1992.
- Pritchard, R.E. Scandalous Liaisons: Charles II and his Court. Amberley Publishing Limited, 2015.
