= Anne Shadwell =

English actress

Anne Shadwell was an English stage actress of the seventeenth century. She was one of the first English actresses to appear on stage following the Restoration. She was one of six recruited in 1660 by William Davenant for the new Duke's Company, acting under her maiden name Anne Gibbs.

Sometime between 1663 and 1667 she married the playwright Thomas Shadwell with whom she had four children. While some sources have her acting late into the century, it may be she effectively retired with the formation of the United Company in 1682. Her appearances had decreased since 1672.

Following her husband's death in 1692 she was left the bulk of his estate. She had an investment in the Drury Lane Theatre in 1709, when she joined a petition to Queen Anne by the manager Christopher Rich, but nothing is known about her after this point.

== Selected roles ==
- Lucia in The Cutter of Coleman Street by Abraham Cowley (1661)
- Decio in The Slighted Maid by Robert Stapylton (1662)
- Heraclia in The Rivals by William Davenant (1664)
- Cleora in Mustapha by Roger Boyle (1665)
- Emelia in The Sullen Lovers by Thomas Shadwell (1668)
- Lady Cockwood in She Would If She Could by George Etherege (1668)
- Claina The Women's Conquest by Edward Howard (1670)
- Irene in Charles VIII of France by John Crowne (1671)
- Joanna in Juliana by John Crowne (1671)
- Celinda in The Six Days' Adventure by Edward Howard (1671)
- Caelia in The Fatal Jealousy by Henry Nevil Payne (1672)
- Lucia in Epsom Wells by Thomas Shadwell (1672)
- Rose in The Morning Ramble by Henry Nevil Payne (1672)
- Clara in The Cheats of Scapin by Thomas Otway (1676)
- Arbella in Madam Fickle by Thomas D'Urfey (1676)
- Lady Gimcrack in The Virtuoso by Thomas Shadwell (1676)
- Beatrice in The Wrangling Lovers by Edward Ravenscroft (1676)
- Mrs Essence in Tom Essence by Thomas Rawlins (1676)
- Duchess of Eboli in Don Carlos, Prince of Spain by Thomas Otway (1676)
- Clarina in The Counterfeit Bridegroom by Aphra Behn (1677)
- Victoria in Friendship in Fashion by Thomas Otway (1678)
- Maundy in Sir Patient Fancy by Aphra Behn (1678)
- Flora in The Counterfeits by John Leanerd (1678)
- Lucinda in The Loving Enemies by Lewis Maidwell (1680)

== Bibliography ==
- Highfill, Philip H, Burnim, Kalman A. & Langhans, Edward A. A Biographical Dictionary of Actors, Actresses, Musicians, Dancers, Managers & Other Stage Personnel in London, 1660–1800, Volume 13. SIU Press, 1991.
- Howe, Elizabeth. The First English Actresses: Women and Drama, 1660–1700. Cambridge University Press, 1992.
