= Mary Saunderson =

17th-century English actress and singer

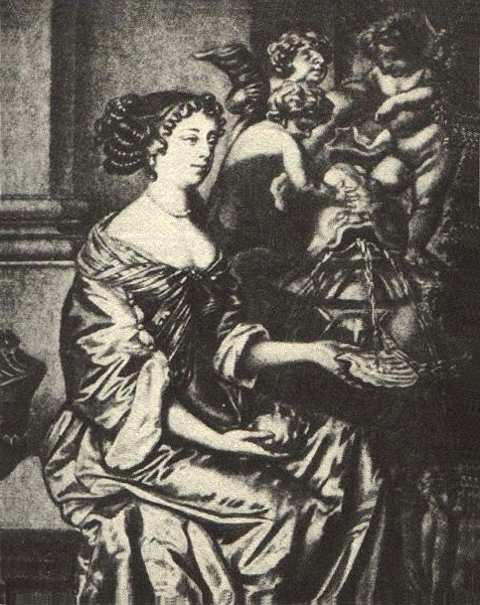
Drawing of the actress

Mary Saunderson (1637–1712), later known as Mary Saunderson Betterton after her marriage to Thomas Betterton, was an actress and singer in England during the 1660s and 1690s. She is considered one of the first English actresses.

== Stage career ==
Her most notable accomplishment is being the first female actress to portray several of Shakespeare's woman characters on the professional stage. She was the first to portray Juliet in Romeo and Juliet, Lady Macbeth in Macbeth, and other female roles in The Tempest, Hamlet (as Ophelia), Measure for Measure, Much Ado About Nothing, Twelfth Night, and King Lear. In Shakespeare's day, female roles were played by teenage boys, as women and young girls were not allowed on the stage. However, by the 1660s the laws in England had changed, allowing females to act professionally. Mary's connections through her husband, Thomas, who was also a famous actor, allowed her to play several significant roles. Saunderson had a reputation for virtue; Colley Cibber described her as leading "an unblemish'd and sober life".

One of her earliest roles was in The Siege of Rhodes, taking over the role of Ianthe in place of Mrs. Edward Coleman, who – many agreed – had done very poorly in the role. Acting under the direction of William Davenant, Mary did very well, even to the point that she was frequently called Ianthe for the rest of her life. She sang in several of Aphra Behn's operas. Perhaps her greatest and most lauded accomplishment was her performance in the role of Lady Macbeth. Actor-playwright Colley Cibber considered her "so great a Mistress of Nature" who was the only actress able to "throw out those quick and careless Strokes of Terror from the Disorder of a guilty Mind … with a Facility in her Manner that render'd them at once tremendous and delightful". She played the major female roles for about 30 years, until she gradually faded out of the stage lights in the early 1690s. Her final appearance was in John Dryden's last play, Love Triumphant, in which she played the leading female role.

== Teaching career ==
Betterton's passion for acting influenced her to put forth her talents as a way of educating and influencing the young minds around her. Mary Betterton and her husband even informally adopted actress Anne Bracegirdle, and played a key role in training her for the very successful and popular stage career that she went on to have. Bracegirdle was also known as "the celebrated virgin", meaning that she was popular for not being the risqué stereotype that came with many actresses during this time. The "celebrated virgin" label that Bracegirdle received was easily attributed to the moral teachings that Betterton also provided when training the young actress.

Mary Betterton was such a positive light and educator to young actresses that King Charles II requested her as his first choice to train his nieces (daughters of his younger brother) to become great actresses, which is a huge reflection of how respected she was as an acting coach and mentor. Lady Anne and Lady Mary grew up to be queens, and the work of Betterton could be seen in their speeches with their "clear and direct voices". Betterton had a lasting impact on these women, so much so that when Thomas Betterton died, Queen Anne granted her a yearly pension to ensure that she was not in want.

== Personal life ==
Mary Betterton was a granddaughter of Richard Burbage, one of William Shakespeare's men, one of the first and most famous Shakespearean actors. Very little or if anything is known of her childhood. The first information that can be found about her is that Sir William Davenant hired her to perform for the Duke's Company in 1661. She lived with other actresses in the company including Hester Davenport under his wife's care until she and the leading man of the company, Thomas Betterton, obtained a marriage license on Christmas Eve in 1662. Their marriage lasted for some 48 years under "the strictest amity" until her husband's death in 1710. Mrs. Betterton was different from many other English actresses, in that she attracted no public chatter or gossip about her personal life; she was simply not interested in enticing any foolish blather about her life off stage.

== Selected roles ==
- Aurelia in The Cutter of Coleman Street by Abraham Cowley (1661)
- Ianthe in The Siege of Rhodes by William Davenant (1661)
- Bellmont in The Villain by Thomas Porter (1662)
- Juliet in Romeo and Juliet by William Shakespeare (1662)
- Duchess of Malfi in The Duchess of Malfi by John Webster (1662)
- Cleora in The Bondman by Philip Massinger (1662)
- Pyramena in The Slighted Maid by Robert Stapylton (1663)
- Portia in The Adventures of Five Hours by Samuel Tuke (1663)
- Caesarina in The Stepmother by Robert Stapylton (1663)
- Graciana in The Comical Revenge by George Etherege (1664)
- Julia in Sir Solomon Single by John Caryll (1670)
- Erminia in The Forc'd Marriage by Aphra Behn (1670)
- Parisatis in The Women's Conquest by Edward Howard (1670)
- Juliana in Juliana by John Crowne (1671)
- Mariamne in Herod and Mariamne by Samuel Pordage (1671)
- Isabella in Charles VIII of France by John Crowne (1671)
- Serina in The Six Days' Adventure by Edward Howard (1671)
- Mandana in Cambyses, King Of Persia by Elkanah Settle (1671)
- Mrs Jilt in Epsom Wells by Thomas Shadwell (1672)
- Lucia in The Citizen Turned Gentleman by Edward Ravenscroft (1672)
- Eugenia in The Fatal Jealousy by Henry Nevil Payne (1672)
- Laula in The Empress of Morocco by Elkanah Settle (1673)
- Juliana in The Reformation by Joseph Arrowsmith (1673)
- Aphelia in Love and Revenge by Elkanah Settle (1674)
- Timandra in Alcibiades by Thomas Otway (1675)
- Orunda in The Conquest of China by Elkanah Settle (1675)
- Florella in Abdelazer by Aphra Behn (1676)
- Isabella in Ibrahim by Elkanah Settle (1676)
- Lady Faddle in The Country Wit by John Crowne (1676)
- Belinda in The Man of Mode by George Etherege (1676)
- Amaryllis in Pastor Fido by Elkanah Settle (1676)
- Miranda in The Virtuoso by Thomas Shadwell (1676)
- Statira in The Siege of Babylon by Samuel Pordage (1677)
- Iphigenia in Circe by Charles Davenant (1677)
- Andromache in The Destruction of Troy by John Banks (1678)
- Isabella in Sir Patient Fancy by Aphra Behn (1678)
- Jocasta in Oedipus by John Dryden (1678)
- Andromache in Troilus and Cressida by John Dryden (1679)
- Pulcheria in Theodosius by Nathaniel Lee (1680)
- Elianor in The Princess of Cleve by Nathaniel Lee (1680)
- Lady Grey in The Misery of Civil War by John Crowne (1680)
- Elvira in The Spanish Fryar by John Dryden (1680)
- Lucretia in Lucius Junius Brutus by Nathaniel Lee (1680)
- Camilla in The Royalist by Thomas D'Urfey (1682)
- Queen Mother in The Massacre of Paris by Nathaniel Lee (1689)
- Cratisiclea in Cleomenes, the Spartan Hero by John Dryden (1692)
- Wishwell in The Maid's Last Prayer by Thomas Southerne (1693)
- Ximena in Love Triumphant by John Dryden (1694)
