= Henry Harris (actor) =

English actor and theatre manager

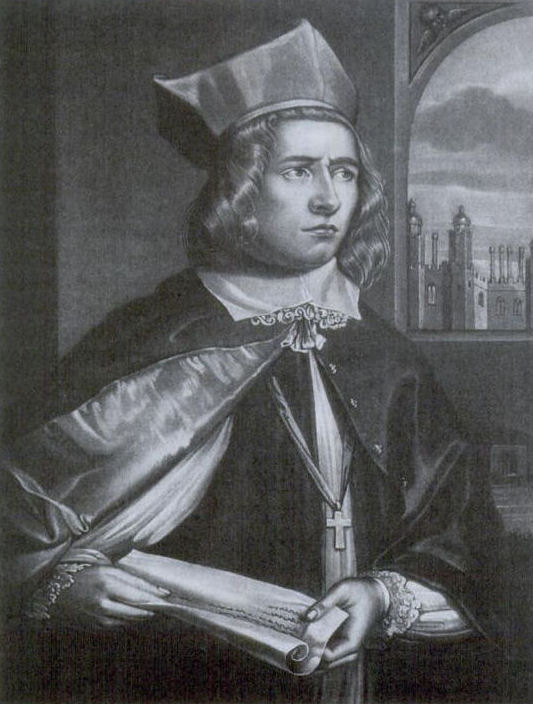
- Harris as Cardinal Wolsey by John Greenhill, 1664.
- Born: c.1634 Kingdom of England
- Died: 3 August 1704; London, Kingdom of England
- Occupation: Stage actor
- Years active: 1661–1681

Henry Harris (c. 1634 – 1704) was an English stage actor and theatre manager. Initially a painter he was a founder member of the new Duke's Company in 1660 following the Restoration which established itself at the old Salisbury Court Theatre before moving to the new Lincoln's Inn Fields Theatre shortly afterwards. Due to his background Harris may have been a set designer and painter during his early years with the company. However, by 1661 he was acting, and his first recorded role was in William Davenant's The Siege of Rhodes that summer. He quickly established himself as the second actor in the troupe after Thomas Betterton.

In 1663 he was briefly arrested, likely due to an attempt to change allegiance to the rival King's Company which was illegal at the time. The dispute seemed to be over pay, and he remained with the Duke's Company. In these years he also mentored an emerging actor Joseph Williams who would go on to have a long stage career of his own. In 1664 Harris played Cardinal Wolsey in a revival of Henry VIII, a widely celebrated performance. He befriended Samuel Pepys in 1667–68 and features in his diary.

When William Davenant died in 1668, Harris and Betterton took over management of the Duke's Company. In 1671 they led the company to the new Dorset Garden Theatre, and Harris took an apartment in the same building. In 1673 he was involved in onstage accident when fellow actor Philip Cademan was seriously injured during a swordfight. Harris was known for his fast living and enjoyed mixing in high society, running up heavy debts. Increasingly during the late 1670s several of his roles were taken over by William Smith, who succeeded him as manager of the Company in 1681 when Harris stepped back from active participation in the theatre. However he continued to remain a shareholder in the Dorset Garden venue although this brought him less revenue due to the merged United Company basing itself at Drury Lane.

In his later years he mostly survived on government sinecures. He died on 3 August 1704 and was buried at St Paul's in Covent Garden, a church closely associated with actors.

Harris also spent time as the Chief Engraver of the Royal Mint.

== Selected roles ==
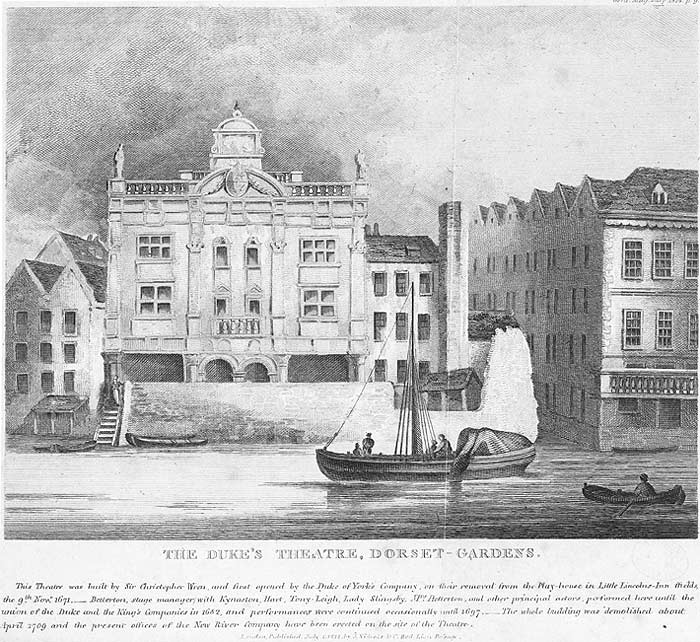
Dorset Gardens Theatre. Harris was a major shareholder in the venue which hosted the Duke's Company from 1671

- Alphonso in The Siege of Rhodes by William Davenant (1661)
- Young Palatine in The Wits by William Davenant (1661)
- Young Trueman in The Cutter of Coleman Street by Abraham Cowley (1661)
- Duke Ferdinand in The Duchess of Malfi by John Webster (1662)
- Monsieur Beaupre in The Villain by Thomas Porter (1662)
- Salerno in The Slighted Maid by Robert Stapylton (1663)
- Antonio in The Adventures of Five Hours by Samuel Tuke (1663)
- Henry V in Henry V by William Shakespeare (1664)
- Theocles in The Rivals by William Davenant (1664)
- Sir Frederick Frolick in The Comical Revenge by George Etherege (1664)
- Cardinal Wolsey in Henry VIII by William Shakespeare (1664)
- Mustapha in Mustapha by Roger Boyle (1665)
- Duke of Richmond in The English Princess by John Caryll (1667)
- Warner in Sir Martin Mar-all by John Dryden (1667)
- Sir Joslin in She Would If She Could by George Etherege (1668)
- Sir Positive At-All in The Sullen Lovers by Thomas Shadwell (1668)
- Tysamnes in The Women's Conquest by Edward Howard (1670)
- Peregrine Woodland in Sir Solomon Single by John Caryll (1670)
- Prexaspes in Cambyses, King Of Persia by Elkanah Settle (1671)
- Ferdinand in Charles VIII of France by John Crowne (1671)
- Sir Franckman in The Six Days' Adventure by Edward Howard (1671)
- Cardinal in Juliana by John Crowne (1671)
- Rains in Epsom Wells by Thomas Shadwell (1672)
- Trickmore in The Citizen Turned Gentleman by Edward Ravenscroft (1672)
- Merry in The Morning Ramble by Henry Nevil Payne (1672)
- Don Fenise in The Spanish Rogue by Thomas Duffett (1673)
- Antonio in The Reformation by Joseph Arrowsmith (1673)
- Muly Labas in The Empress of Morocco by Elkanah Settle (1673)
- Theramnes in Alcibiades by Thomas Otway (1675)
- Zungteus in The Conquest of China by Elkanah Settle (1675)
- Araspes in Gloriana by Nathaniel Lee (1676)
- Ulama in Ibrahim by Elkanah Settle (1676)
- Ferdinand in Abdelazer by Aphra Behn (1676)
- Medly in The Man of Mode by George Etherege (1676)
- Merry in The Country Wit by John Crowne (1676)
- Don John in Don Carlos, Prince of Spain by Thomas Otway (1676)
- Don Gusmun in The Wrangling Lovers by Edward Ravenscroft (1676)
- Thoas in Circe by Charles Davenant (1677)
- Cassander in The Siege of Babylon by Samuel Pordage (1677)
- Ranger in A Fond Husband by Thomas D'Urfey (1677)
- Tiresias in Oedipus by John Dryden (1678)
- Antonio in The Counterfeits by John Leanerd (1678)
- Valentine in Friendship in Fashion by Thomas Otway (1678)
- Hector in The Destruction of Troy by John Banks (1678)
- Beverly in The Virtuous Wife by Thomas D'Urfey (1679)
- King in The Loyal General by Nahum Tate (1679)
- Ulysses in Troilus and Cressida by John Dryden (1679)
- Cardinal in Henry VI, Part I by William Shakespeare (1681)

== Bibliography ==
- Highfill, Philip H, Burnim, Kalman A. & Langhans, Edward A. A Biographical Dictionary of Actors, Actresses, Musicians, Dancers, Managers, and Other Stage Personnel in London, 1660–1800. SIU Press, 1982.
- Van Lennep, W. The London Stage, 1660–1800: Volume One, 1660–1700. Southern Illinois University Press, 1960.
