= John Crosby (actor) =

English actor

John Crosby (died 1724) was an English stage actor of the Restoration Period. He first recorded performance is in 1662 when he appeared in Ignoramus at Whitehall Palace, likely as a child actor. It was further eight years before he was solidly established in the Duke's Company in 1670 beginning with The Forc'd Marriage by Aphra Behn. He became a regular with the company over the following decade, often playing young lover roles. He retired from the stage in 1679 and later became a justice of the peace for Middlesex. He died on 8 April 1724 and was buried in St Sepulchre.

== Selected roles ==
- Cleontius in The Forc'd Marriage by Aphra Behn (1670)
- Andrages in The Women's Conquest by Edward Howard (1670)
- Louis in Charles VIII of France by John Crowne (1671)
- Pheroras in Herod and Mariamne by Samuel Pordage (1671)
- Featlin in The Six Days' Adventure by Edward Howard (1671)
- Otanes in Cambyses, King Of Persia by Elkanah Settle (1671)
- Alexey in Juliana by John Crowne (1671)
- Me Cleverwit in The Citizen Turned Gentleman by Edward Ravenscroft (1672)
- Rash in The Morning Ramble by Henry Nevil Payne (1672)
- Don Sebastian in The Fatal Jealousy by Henry Nevil Payne (1672)
- Leandro in The Reformation by Joseph Arrowsmith (1673)
- Abdelcador in The Empress of Morocco by Elkanah Settle (1673)
- Lewis in Love and Revenge by Elkanah Settle (1674)
- Patroclus in Alcibiades by Thomas Otway (1675)
- Alonzo in Abdelazer by Aphra Behn (1676)
- Courtly in Tom Essence by Thomas Rawlins (1676)
- Arsaces in Titus and Berenice by Thomas Otway (1676)
- Sylvio in Pastor Fido by Elkanah Settle (1676)
- Marquis of Posa in Don Carlos, Prince of Spain by Thomas Otway (1676)
- Noble in The Counterfeit Bridegroom by Aphra Behn (1677)
- Ptolomy in The Siege of Babylon by Samuel Pordage (1677)
- Claudio in The French Conjuror by Thomas Porter (1677)
- Haemon in Oedipus by John Dryden (1678)
- Leander Fancy in Sir Patient Fancy by Aphra Behn (1678)
- Lovell in Squire Oldsapp by Thomas D'Urfey (1678)
- Paris in The Destruction of Troy by John Banks (1678)
- Diomedes in Troilus and Cressida by John Dryden (1679)
- Julio in The Feign'd Curtizans by Aphra Behn (1679)

== Bibliography ==
- Highfill, Philip H, Burnim, Kalman A. & Langhans, Edward A. A Biographical Dictionary of Actors, Actresses, Musicians, Dancers, Managers, and Other Stage Personnel in London, 1660-1800: Corye to Dynion. SIU Press, 1975.
- Van Lennep, W. The London Stage, 1660-1800: Volume One, 1660-1700. Southern Illinois University Press, 1960.
