= Philip Cademan =

English actor

Philip Cademan (born. 1643) was an English stage actor of the Restoration era.

The son of an apothecary Thomas Cross, he adopted his stepfather's surname of Cademan after his mother remarried. In 1651 she married again this time to the playwright William Davenant, who following the return of Charles II to the throne and the reopening of theatres, brought Cademan into the newly formed Duke's Company. His first known role as Sylvio in The Duchess of Malfi in 1662. He continued acting with the company, at Lincoln's Inn Fields and then the Dorset Gardens Theatre until 1673, when he was involved in a stage accident. During a performance of The Man's the Master he was wounded in the head with a sword during a stagefight with fellow actor Henry Harris. Unable to resume his career, he was paid a pension of thirty shillings a week.

== Selected roles ==
- Arviedo in The Slighted Maid by Robert Stapylton (1663)
- Haly in Mustapha by Roger Boyle (1665)
- Pisauro in The Forc'd Marriage by Aphra Behn (1670)
- Alvanes in The Women's Conquest by Edward Howard (1670)
- Ghost in Charles VIII of France by John Crowne (1671)
- Lovewell in The Town Shifts by Edward Revet (1671)
- Young Jorden in The Citizen Turned Gentleman by Edward Ravenscroft (1672)
- Lovell in The Careless Lovers by Edward Ravenscroft (1673)
- Pedro in The Reformation by Joseph Arrowsmith (1673)

== Bibliography ==
- Highfill, Philip H, Burnim, Kalman A. & Langhans, Edward A. A Biographical Dictionary of Actors, Actresses, Musicians, Dancers, Managers and Other Stage Personnel in London, 1660-1800: Cabanel to Cory. SIU Press, 1975.
