= The Cutter of Coleman Street =

1661 play

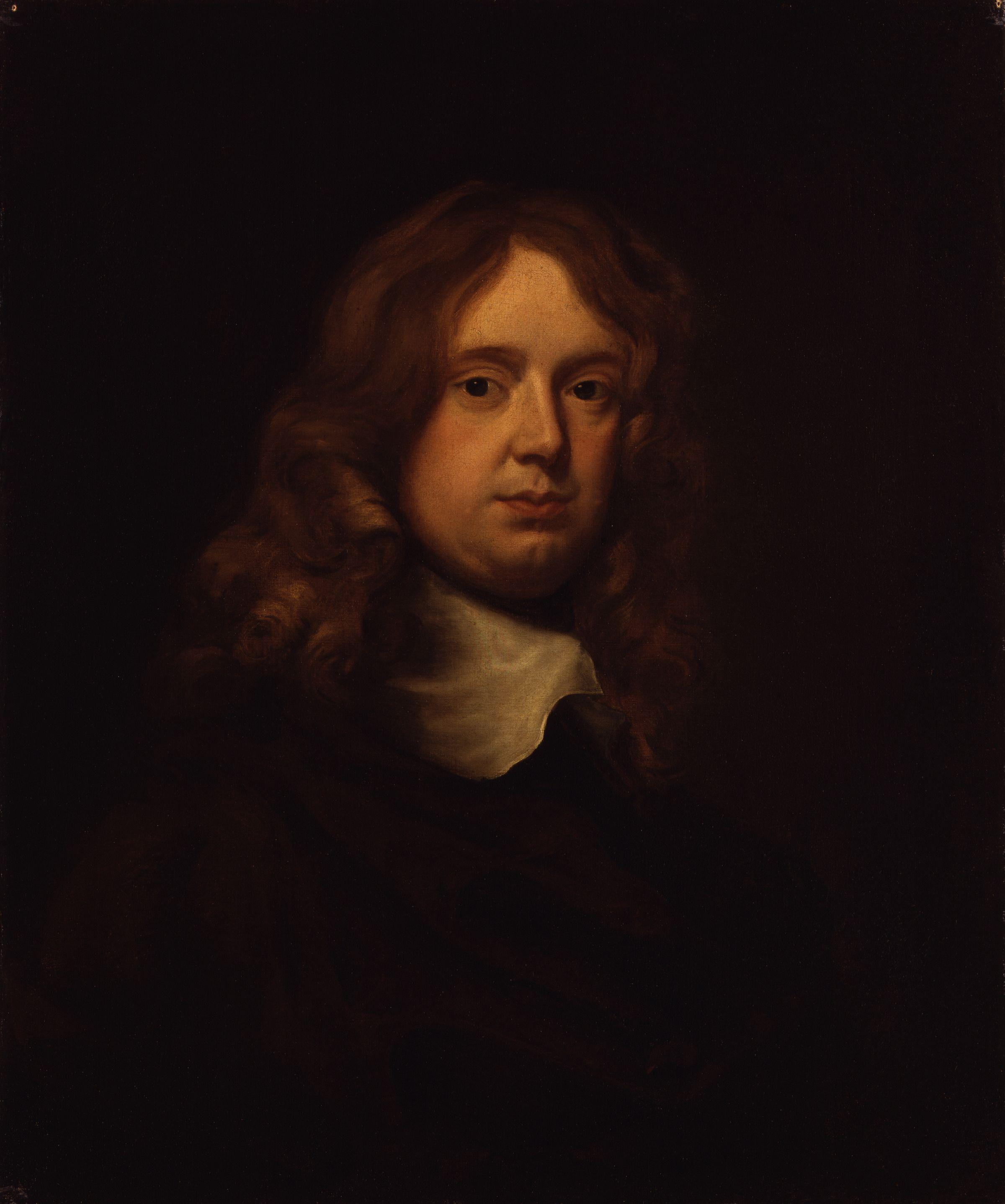
- Abraham Cowley around the time the play premiered.
- Original language: English
- Written by: Abraham Cowley
- Genre: Restoration Comedy
- Setting: London, present day

Premiere
- Date: 16 December 1661
- Place: Lincoln's Inn Fields Theatre, London

The Cutter of Coleman Street is a comedy play by the English writer Abraham Cowley. It premiered at the Lincoln's Inn Fields Theatre on 16 December 1661, performed by the Duke's Company. Cowley had originally written it in 1658 during the English Commonwealth era. The title refers to Coleman Street in the City of London. The Royalist Cowley inserted lines mocking the recent republican government of England, including Thomas Harrison who had been executed for regicide the previous year. Although it was released during the Restoration period, along with The Committee its debt to earlier traditions mean that it is not a full Restoration comedy in the style that would flourish after George Etherege's The Comical Revenge in 1664.

The original cast included Thomas Betterton as Colonel Jolly, Henry Harris as Young Trueman, Thomas Lovell as Old Trueman, Cave Underhill as Cutter, Samuel Sandford as Captain Worme, James Nokes as Puny, Mary Betterton as Aurelia, Anne Gibbs as Lucia and Jane Long as Laughing Jane.

== Bibliography ==
- Canfield, J. Douglas. Tricksters and Estates: On the Ideology of Restoration Comedy. University Press of Kentucky, 2014.
- Farr, David. Major-General Thomas Harrison: Millenarianism, Fifth Monarchism and the English Revolution 1616-1660. Routledge, 2016.
- Fisk, Deborah Payne & Canfield, J. Douglas Cultural Readings of Restoration and Eighteenth-Century English Theater. University of Georgia Press, 2010.
- Van Lennep, W. The London Stage, 1660-1800: Volume One, 1660-1700. Southern Illinois University Press, 1960.
