= Mustapha (1665 play) =

1665 play

- Original language: English
- Written by: Roger Boyle, 1st Earl of Orrery
- Genre: Tragedy
- Setting: Ottoman Empire, 1550s

Premiere
- Date: 3 April 1665
- Place: Lincoln's Inn Fields Theatre, London

Mustapha, The Son Of Solyman The Magnificent is a 1665 tragedy by the Irish writer Roger Boyle, 1st Earl of Orrery. It was first performed by the Duke's Company at the Lincoln's Inn Fields Theatre in London. It is based on the life of Şehzade Mustafa, son of Suleiman the Magnificent who had him executed.

The original cast included Thomas Betterton as Solyman, Henry Harris as Mustapha, William Smith as Zanger, Samuel Sandford as Rustan, John Richards as Pyrrhus, John Young as Cardinal of Veradium, Philip Cademan as Haly, James Nokes as Achmat, Edward Angel as Viche, Moll Davis as Queen of Hungaria, Matthew Medbourne as Thuricus, Jane Long as Zarma and Anne Shadwell as Cleora.

== Bibliography ==
- Keenan, Tim. Restoration Staging, 1660-74. Taylor & Francis, 2016.
- Maguire, Nancy Klein. Regicide and Restoration: English Tragicomedy, 1660-1671. Cambridge University Press, 1992.
- Van Lennep, W. The London Stage, 1660-1800: Volume One, 1660-1700. Southern Illinois University Press, 1960.
