= Cambyses, King of Persia =

1671 play

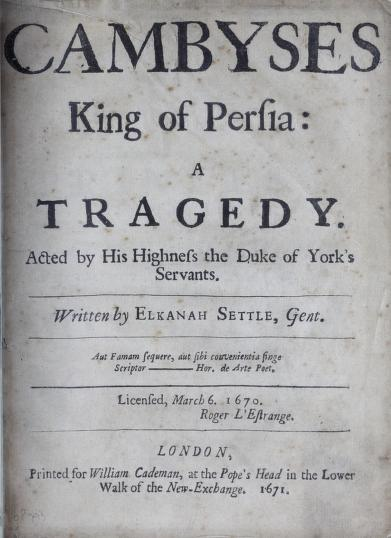
- Written by: Elkanah Settle
- Original language: English
- Genre: Tragedy

Premiere
- Date premiered: 12 April 1671
- Place premiered: Lincoln's Inn Fields Theatre, London

Cambyses, King of Persia is 1671 tragedy by the English writer Elkanah Settle about Cambyses II.

It was staged by the Duke's Company at the Lincoln's Inn Fields Theatre in London. The original cast included Thomas Betterton as Cambyses, Henry Harris as Prexaspes, John Crosby as Otanes, William Smith as Darius, Henry Norris as Artaban, Matthew Medbourne as Smerdis, Samuel Sandford as Parasithes, John Young as Theramnes, Mary Betterton as Mandana, Elinor Dixon as Orinda and Jane Long as Osiris.

== Bibliography ==
- Van Lennep, W. The London Stage, 1660-1800: Volume One, 1660-1700. Southern Illinois University Press, 1960.
