= The Reformation (play) =

1673 play

- Original language: English
- Written by: Joseph Arrowsmith
- Genre: Restoration Comedy

Premiere
- Date: May 1673
- Place: Lincoln's Inn Fields Theatre, London

The Reformation is a 1673 comedy play by Joseph Arrowsmith. Originally staged by the Duke's Company, it premiered at the Lincoln's Inn Fields Theatre in London. The cast included Samuel Sandford as Camillo, Anthony Leigh as Pacheco, Cave Underhill as Tutor, Henry Harris as Antonio, Philip Cademan as Pedro, John Crosby as Leandro, Matthew Medbourne as Lysander, Mary Betterton as Juliana, Margaret Osborne as Lelia and Mary Lee as AEmilia.

== Bibliography ==
- Canfield, J. Douglas. Tricksters and Estates: On the Ideology of Restoration Comedy. University Press of Kentucky, 2014.
- Van Lennep, W. The London Stage, 1660-1800: Volume One, 1660-1700. Southern Illinois University Press, 1960.
