= A Fond Husband =

1677 play by Thomas d'Urfey

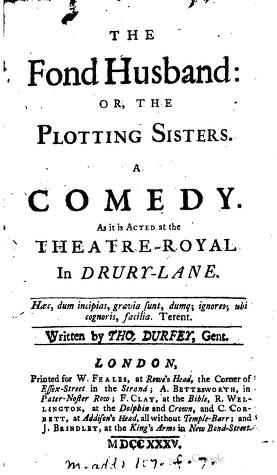
- 1735 version printed at the time of a revival at Drury Lane.
- Original language: English
- Written by: Thomas D'Urfey
- Genre: Restoration Comedy

Premiere
- Date: 31 May 1677
- Place: Dorset Garden Theatre, London

A Fond Husband; Or, The Plotting Sisters also known as The Fond Husband is a 1677 comedy play by the English writer Thomas D'Urfey. It was first staged by the Duke's Company at London's Dorset Garden Theatre with a cast that included William Smith as Rashley, Henry Harris as Ranger, James Nokes as Peregrine Bubble, Anthony Leigh as Old Fumble, Samuel Sandford as Sir Roger Petulant, Thomas Jevon as Sneak, John Richards as Spatterdash, Thomas Percival as Apothecary, Elizabeth Barry as Emillia, Rebecca Marshall as Maria and Margaret Hughes as Cordelia. The published version was dedicated to the Irish statesman James Butler, Duke of Ormonde.

It was a popular work and was revived on a number of occasions.

== Bibliography ==
- Van Lennep, W. The London Stage, 1660-1800: Volume One, 1660-1700. Southern Illinois University Press, 1960.
