= The Fatal Jealousy =

1672 play

- Original language: English
- Written by: Henry Nevil Payne
- Genre: Tragedy

Premiere
- Date: 3 August 1672
- Place: Dorset Garden Theatre, London

The Fatal Jealousy (also written as The Fatal Jealousie) is a 1672 tragedy by the English writer Henry Nevil Payne. It was staged by the Duke's Company at the Dorset Garden Theatre with a cast that included William Smith as Don Antonio, Matthew Medbourne as Don Gerardo, John Crosby as Don Sebastian, Samuel Sandford as Jasper, John Young as Don Francisco, Henry Norris as Servant, James Nokes as Nurse, Anne Shadwell as Caelia, Mary Betterton as Eugenia, Margaret Osborne as Flora.

== Bibliography ==
- Van Lennep, W. The London Stage, 1660-1800: Volume One, 1660-1700. Southern Illinois University Press, 1960.
