= The Six Days' Adventure =

1671 play

- Original language: English
- Written by: Edward Howard
- Genre: Comedy

Premiere
- Date: March 1671
- Place: Lincoln's Inn Fields Theatre, London

The Six Days' Adventure; Or, The New Utopia is a 1671 comedy play by the English writer Edward Howard. First performed by the Duke's Company at the Lincoln's Inn Fields Theatre in London, the original cast included Cave Underhill as Sir Adam Meridith, Matthew Medbourne as Sir Grave Solymour, Henry Harris as Sir Franckman, John Crosby as Featlin, John Young as Polidor, James Nokes as Foppering, Edward Angel as Peacock, Samuel Sandford as Orlando Curioso, Mary Betterton as Serina, Anne Shadwell as Celinda, Jane Long as Crispina, Elinor Dixon as Petilla and Mary Lee as Eugenia.

== Bibliography ==
- Van Lennep, W. The London Stage, 1660-1800: Volume One, 1660-1700. Southern Illinois University Press, 1960.
