= Alcibiades (play) =

1675 play

- Original language: English
- Written by: Thomas Otway
- Genre: Tragedy

Premiere
- Date: September 1675
- Place: Dorset Garden Theatre, London

Alcibiades is a 1675 tragedy by the English writer Thomas Otway, based on the life of the Athenian statesman and general Alcibiades. Staged by the Duke's Company, it premiered at the Dorset Garden Theatre in London with a cast that featured Thomas Betterton as Alcibiades, Matthew Medbourne as Agis, Samuel Sandford as Tissaphernes, John Crosby as Patroclus, Henry Harris as Theramnes, Thomas Gillow as Polyndus, Mary Lee as Deidamia, Mary Betterton as Timandra and Elizabeth Barry as Draxilla.

Alcibiades is a verse play is written in heroic couplets, that is rhymed verse in iambic pentameter, which was championed by John Dryden at the time. While Otway originally wrote in rhymed tragedies, he eventually settled on writing in blank (unrhymed) verse in iambic pentameter, the better to imitate Shakespeare.

Alcibiades draws inspiration from Plutarch's Parallel Lives. The story centers around the historical character of Alcibiades during his exile to Sparta, and his seduction of the Spartan Queen.

== Characters ==
Men

- Agis
- Alcibiades, General of Athens, but fled thence in discontent, and made General of Sparta, betrothed to Timandra
- Tissaphernes, the old General of Sparta
- Patroclus, his Son and Friend to Alcibiades
- Theramnes, the now Athenian General, in love with Timandra
- Polyndus, a young Noble of Athens, his friend

Women

- Deidamia, Queen of Sparta, in love with Alcibiades
- Timandra, a noble Athenian Lady, betrothed to Alcibiades
- Draxilla, Sister to Alcibiades, and her Friend
- Ardella, Lady of Honour to the Queen of Sparta

Also: Priests and Priestesses of Hymen, Spirits, Guards, Messengers, Villains, Ladies, etc.

== Bibliography ==
- Van Lennep, W. The London Stage, 1660-1800: Volume One, 1660-1700. Southern Illinois University Press, 1960.
