= Amintor's Lamentation for Celia's Unkindness =

Song

Amintor's Lamentation for Celia's Unkindness is an English broadside ballad from the 17th century that tells the story of a young man who falls in love with the coy Celia who does not love him back, and leaves the country to avoid him. The ballad begins with Amintor lamenting her refusal to return his love, and concludes with Celia's response, in which she accuses Amintor of using charm and arts to try to steal her purity. Sung to the tune of "Since Celia's My Foe." Copies of the broadside can be found in the British Library and the National Library of Scotland. On-line transcriptions of the ballad are also available for public consumption.

== Synopsis ==
The ballad is introduced as a lesson to both sexes, so that they may learn the extremes of both Celia's coldness and Amintor's despair. Though the ballad begins with Amintor lamenting Celia's coldness, her answer suggests that Amintor is trying to use his show of despair to manipulate her into compromising her virtue and purity. In the end, she sails for France and leaves him behind.

The ballad begins with Amintor telling Celia that he is going to go grieve in the desert by himself since Celia refuses to return his love. A series of comparisons to nature follows: the river is likened to his tears; the dew on tree leaves in the morning will be more "relenting" than Celia; the rocks will echo his moans. Amintor then complains that Celia will return no answer to his mourning. He suggests that she rebuffs him because he loves her too much, and that she might love him more if he "went astray." He says he would rather die, however, than be untrue to her, and then immediately asks Celia why she refuses him if he's willing to die for her. He warns her that once he stops pursuing her, she will realize that she will never again have a lover so true. He also worries out loud that the waves and storms of her sea voyage to France may be dangerous. Though he then reassures her that the "Nymphs of the deep" will protect her, he tries to convince her to stay by suggesting that she is risking her life on the ocean. Finally, he gives in to fate and decides he must accept her hate and turn back to the shore to suffer winter alone.

Celia's answer to Amintor tells a different story. She says that his attempts to vilify her are simply an attempt to cover up his own part in forcing her to leave. She tells him that she knew he would deceive her even though he said he'd be true, and that her leaving will probably be good for him, since it will "hinder" the "heat of [his] blood." Her story suggests that he is simply trying to compromise her virtue through art and charm, and she refuses to be manipulated by his exhortations. She says that it's typical for men who are "lewd" to act virtuous and self-pitying in order to manipulate women, and that the dangerous waves are safer than what might happen if she were to stay. She assures him that there are thousands of other women who will help to "dampen his fire," and will happily take all of his presents and give in to his desires. She, however, could never be tempted to "bed with an earl," no matter what jewels and riches he offers. She gives him leave to go into the desert and talk to the rocks and trees about his pain and blame everything on her. Finally she accepts that she may die on her voyage, but that his skills in wooing will never convince her to stay.

=== Form ===
The song is sung in 26 short stanzas, with an AABBA rhyme scheme.

== Historical and Cultural Significance ==
=== Amintor and Celia ===
The story of Amintor and Celia provides the narrative core for a number of restoration poems and songs, though the outcome of the story varies. A shorter version of the poem first appeared in Thomas Duffet's New Poems, Songs, Prologues and Epilogues, under the title Song to the Irish Tune. Duffett then expanded the song for the broadside printed for P. Brooksby (in the National Library of Scotland). According to Joseph Woodfall Ebsworth and The Ballad Society, the Celia of this ballad is the same as the Celia from The Forc'd Marriage and An Answer to the Forc'd Marriage, about a young woman who marries an old man for his money and then grows tired of his "feeble" embraces, preferring to be with young men. However, she should not be confused with the Celia of Cruel Celia, OR The Lover's Complaint, which is adapted from John Dryden's Cleomenes (1692), or Coy Ceclia's Cruelty, also adapted from a Dryden song from Amphitryon (1690).

A 1689 broadside printed for I. Blare, called The Happy Lovers OR, Caelia Won by Aminta's Loyalty tells a very different story, as made clear by the subtitle.

In "Since Bearing of a Gentle Mind" by Thomas Parnell, Amintor succeeds in wooing Celia.

A version of the song is sung in John Crowne's The Ambitious Statesman (1679), when the Duke finds the Dauphin caressing Louise. In this version, Celia remains cold and haughty but secretly loves Amintor. When she worries that his heart might be growing hard because of her rebuffs, she gives in and becomes more "gentle." The narrator of the song urges Amintor to drive home his advantage, and that Celia's claim of modesty should not be believed.

Restoration poet Aaron Hill wrote two poems of the story of Amintor and Celia: "Celia to Amintor" and "Amintor's Answer". These poems also tell a different story of Celia and Amintor. In "Celia to Amintor," she tells him that she will become another "Niobe," turning to stone, if she does not see him. His presence is the only thing that will ease her woes. In "Amintor's Answer," Amintor accuses her of wandering and dissembling.

Caelia and Aminta are referenced in Song XV of The Whining Lover from Frank Murray's The Cupid: A Collection of Love Songs.

=== Since Celia's My Foe and Lochaber No More ===
The tune for this ballad is widely used for other ballads, including The Happy Lovers, and it is also a popular tune for traditional Irish folk songs. In the 19th century, William Stokes showed that Thomas Duffet was an Irishman before moving to England, which he argues is an explanation for this crossover. He points to The Banished Man's Adieu to His Country and The Banished Man's Adieu to the World as examples of traditional Irish songs that utilize the tune and play off of the original themes developed by Duffet, replacing "Celia" with "The World" as the foe of the narrator.

In addition, it is the tune for the Scotch song Lochaber No More, which has led to some controversy over its author. The Scotch attribute the tune to Allan Ramsay, from his The Tea-Table Miscellany (1724-7), but Ramsay was not born until 1696, which means that it was known as an Irish tune twenty years before he was born. It is also claimed that the original song was called King James's March to Ireland, but again, the Irish tune was popular before James II became king. In the Scotch versions, the song was recorded by The Boys of the Lough as the title track of their 1976 album, Lochaber No More.
