= Sir Solomon Single =

1670 play

- Written by: John Caryll
- Original language: English
- Genre: Restoration comedy
- Setting: London, present day

Premiere
- Date premiered: April 1670
- Place premiered: Lincoln's Inn Fields Theatre, London

Sir Salomon; Or, The Cautious Coxcomb is a 1670 comedy play by the English writer John Caryll. It has often been staged under the title Sir Solomon Single. It was first performed by the Duke's Company at the Lincoln's Inn Fields Theatre in London. It is part of the tradition of Restoration comedy.

The original cast included Thomas Betterton as Sir Solomon, Henry Harris as Peregrine Woodland, William Smith as Single, Samuel Sandford as Wary, Cave Underhill as Timothy and Mary Betterton as Julia.

== Bibliography ==
- Van Lennep, W. The London Stage, 1660-1800: Volume One, 1660-1700. Southern Illinois University Press, 1960.
