= The Country Wit =

1676 play

- Original language: English
- Written by: John Crowne
- Genre: Comedy

Premiere
- Date: 10 January 1676
- Place: Dorset Garden Theatre, London

The Country Wit is a 1676 comedy play by the English writer John Crowne, part of the tradition of Restoration Comedy. It was first staged at the Dorset Garden Theatre in London by the Duke's Company. The cast included Samuel Sandford as Sir Thomas Rash, Thomas Betterton as Ramble, James Nokes as Sir Mannerly Shallow, Henry Harris as Merry, Cave Underhill as Booby, Matthew Medbourne as Lord Drybone, Anthony Leigh as Rash, Mary Betterton as Lady Faddle, Mary Lee as Christina, Elizabeth Currer as Betty Frisque and Elinor Leigh as Isabella.

== Bibliography ==
- Canfield, J. Douglas. Tricksters and Estates: On the Ideology of Restoration Comedy. University Press of Kentucky, 2014.
- Van Lennep, W. The London Stage, 1660-1800: Volume One, 1660-1700. Southern Illinois University Press, 1960.
