= The Women's Conquest =

1670 play

- Original language: English
- Written by: Edward Howard
- Genre: Tragedy

Premiere
- Date: November 1670
- Place: Lincoln's Inn Fields Theatre, London

The Women's Conquest is a 1670 tragedy by the English writer Edward Howard. It was first staged by the Duke's Company at the Lincoln's Inn Fields Theatre with a cast that included Henry Harris as Tysamnes, William Smith as Foscaris, John Crosby as Andrages, John Young as Bassanes, Samuel Sandford as Toxaris, Philip Cademan as Alvanes, Henry Norris as Araxis, Mary Betterton as Parisatis, Jane Long as Mandana, Anne Shadwell as Clarina, Elinor Dixon as Melvissa and Mary Lee as Doranthe.

== Bibliography ==
- Van Lennep, W. The London Stage, 1660-1800: Volume One, 1660-1700. Southern Illinois University Press, 1960.
