= Charles VIII of France (play) =

1671 play

- Original language: English
- Written by: John Crowne
- Genre: Tragedy

Premiere
- Date: November 1671
- Place: Dorset Garden Theatre, London

Charles VIII of France also known by the longer title The History Of Charles The Eighth Of France; Or, The Invasion Of Naples Of The French is a 1671 tragedy by the English writer John Crowne. It is based on the reign of Charles VIII of France and particularly his Italian War of the 1490s.

It was first performed at the Dorset Garden Theatre by the Duke's Company with a cast that included Thomas Betterton as Charles the Eighth, Matthew Medbourne as Alphonso, Henry Harris as Ferdinand, William Smith as Prince of Salerne, John Young as Ascanio, Samuel Sandford as Trivultio, Philip Cademan as Ghost, John Crosby as Lewis, Henry Norris as Mompensier, Mary Betterton as Isabella, Margaret Osborne as Cornelia, Elinor Dixon as Julia and Anne Shadwell as Irene.

== Bibliography ==
- Van Lennep, W. The London Stage, 1660-1800: Volume One, 1660-1700. Southern Illinois University Press, 1960.
