= The Forc'd Marriage =

Play written by Aphra Behn

The Forc'd Marriage; or, The Jealous Bridegroom is a play by Aphra Behn, staged by the Duke's Company on 20 September 1670 in Lincoln's Inn Fields, London, England. This sex tragicomedy ran for six nights, which granted Behn the house profits for both the third and six nights. It is considered her first staged play. Thomas Otway played a "probation part."

== Plot ==
Like The Amorous Prince and The Young King, The Forc'd Marriage draws heavily on Caroline stage effects, such as the use of the masque, disguise and costume. It features themes of proper authority in royal succession as well as Behn's recurrent concerns with interactions of sex, power and state politics.

In this class-based comedy, the king forces the protagonist, Erminia, to marry Alcippus, a military man. But Erminia is in love with the king's son, Philander. And Philander's sister Galatea is in love with Alcippus, who is Philander's best friend. This awkward situation leads to the best friends becoming worst enemies and planning a duel (especially as both men fancy Erminia). Erminia says she'll marry Alcippus but not sleep with him - a solution he deems unacceptable. A series of farcical situations, mistaken identities and disguises follow, with the equality of women a thematic thread through the narrative.

== Print history ==
The Forc'd Marriage was first published by H. L. and R. B. for James Magnus in Russell Street, 1671, with prologue of 28 lines and epilogue "By a woman" of 18 lines. The play was advertised in Nathaniel Lee's Theodosius, 1680, and in John Crowne's The Destruction of Jerusalem by Titus Vespasion, the Second Part, 1677.

== Stage history ==
The Forc'd Marriage was originally performed Tuesday, 20 September 1670 to open the season of the Duke's Company. It initiated Behn's career working for the Duke's Company under the leadership of Thomas Betterton, who also played the role of Alcippus. The prologue included the lines "The Poetess, too, they say / Has spies abroad," referring both to Behn's gender and her past as a spy. It was spoken by the character of Falatius, who wore an eye patch, a stage prop indicating the secretary of state Lord Arlington, who supposedly abandoned her on her intelligence mission in Antwerp. For the first performance at least, contemporary records say that Thomas Otway, the poet, did not perform well: "The full House put him to such a Sweat and Tremendous, Agony, being dash't, spoil him for an Actor."

=== Original cast ===
The original cast includes:

=== Men ===
- Mr. Westwood (King)
- Mr. Smith (Philander)
- Mr. Betterton (Alcippus)
- Mr. Norris (Orguilious)
- Mr. Young (Alcander)
- Mr. Cademan (Pisauro)
- Mr. Angel (Falatio[sic])
- Mr. Crosby (Cleontius)

=== Women ===
- Mrs. Jennings (Galatea)
- Mrs. Betterton (Erminia)
- Mrs. Wright (Aminta)
- Mrs. Lee (Olinda)
- Mrs. Clough (Isillia)
