= Edward Angel (actor) =

English actor

Edward Angel (died 1673) was an English stage actor of the early Restoration Era. Along with James Nokes and Cave Underhill he was one of the leading comedians of the period. It is possible he began his career as a boy actor during the pre-English Civil War era, but he was an experienced actor by the time he was a member of John Rhodes's troupe in 1660. From 1662 he acted with the Duke's Company, initially at Lincoln's Inn Fields and after 1671 at the new Dorset Garden Theatre.

== Selected roles ==
- Pyropus in Ignoramus by William Davenant (1662)
- Friskin in The Unfortunate Lovers by William Davenant (1664)
- Viche in Mustapha by Roger Boyle (1665)
- Woodcock in The Sullen Lovers by Thomas Shadwell (1668)
- Fallatius in The Forc'd Marriage by Aphra Behn (1670)
- Peacock in The Six Days' Adventure by Edward Howard (1671)
- Leftwell in The Town Shifts by Edward Revet (1671)
- Landlord in Juliana by John Crowne (1671)
- Fribble in Epsom Wells by Thomas Shadwell (1672)
- Maistre Jaques in The Citizen Turned Gentleman by Edward Ravenscroft (1672)
- De Boastado in The Careless Lovers by Edward Ravenscroft (1673)

== Bibliography ==
- Hughes, Derek. The Theatre of Aphra Behn. Springer, 2000.
- Highfill, Philip H, Burnim, Kalman A. & Langhans, Edward A. A Biographical Dictionary of Actors, Actresses, Musicians, Dancers, Managers, and Other Stage Personnel in London, 1660-1800: Abaco to Belfille. SIU Press, 1973.
