= Juliana (play) =

1671 play

- Written by: John Crowne
- Original language: English
- Genre: Tragedy

Premiere
- Date premiered: November 1671
- Place premiered: Lincoln's Inn Fields Theatre, London

Juliana; Or, The Princess Of Poland is a 1671 tragedy by the English writer John Crowne. It was originally staged by the Duke's Company at the Lincoln's Inn Fields Theatre in London.

The original cast included Mary Betterton as Juliana, Thomas Betterton as Ladislaus, Henry Harris as Cardinal, John Young as Demetrius, William Smith as Sharnofsky, Samuel Sandford as Cassonofsky, Henry Norris as Colimsky, Edward Angel as Landlord, Matthew Medbourne as Theodore, John Crosby as Alexey, Jane Long as Paulina and Anne Shadwell as Joanna.

== Bibliography ==
- Van Lennep, W. The London Stage, 1660-1800: Volume One, 1660-1700. Southern Illinois University Press, 1960.
