= The Rivals (1664 play) =

1664 play

- Original language: English
- Written by: William Davenant
- Genre: Restoration Comedy

Premiere
- Date: September 1664
- Place: Lincoln's Inn Fields Theatre, London

The Rivals is a 1664 comedy play by the English writer William Davenant. It is a reworking of The Two Noble Kinsmen by William Shakespeare and John Fletcher.

It was first acted by the Duke's Company at the Lincoln's Inn Fields Theatre in London. The original cast included Henry Harris as Theocles, Thomas Betterton as Philander, Cave Underhill as Cunopes the Jailor, John Young as Arcon, William Smith as Polynices, Samuel Sandford as Provost, Anne Shadwell as Heraclia and Jane Long as Leucippe.

It was a success running for nine straight nights and being revived on several occasions.

== Bibliography ==
- Collins, Howard S. The Comedy of Sir William Davenant. Walter de Gruyter, 2015.
- Van Lennep, W. The London Stage, 1660-1800: Volume One, 1660-1700. Southern Illinois University Press, 1960.
