= Sir Patient Fancy =

1678 play

- Written by: Aphra Behn
- Original language: English
- Genre: Comedy

Premiere
- Date premiered: 17 January 1678
- Place premiered: Dorset Garden Theatre, London

Sir Patient Fancy: A Comedy, is a comedic play written by Aphra Behn, first performed in 1678. It is Behn's first overtly political play. It was staged by the Duke's Company at the Dorset Garden Theatre in London with a cast that included Nell Gwyn as Lady Knowell, Anthony Leigh as Sir Patient Fancy, John Crosby as Leander Fancy, Thomas Betterton as Wittmore, William Smith as Lodwick Knowell, James Nokes as Sir Credulous Easy, John Richards as Curry, Elizabeth Currer as Lady Fancy, Mary Betterton as Isabella, Emily Price as Lucretia and Anne Shadwell as Maundy.

The play is influenced by Moliere's last play, Le malade imaginaire.

== Plot ==
Sir Patient Fancy, a hypochondriacal old man, has married the young and beautiful Lucia. She had wanted to marry Charles Wittmore, but neither of them had any money of their own. Charles and Lucia have an affair under Sir Patient's nose.

At the end of the play, Lucia and Wittmore reveal to her husband that they are lovers and had plotted her marriage to him for money. Sir Patient announces his plans to divorce Lucia. Now controlling a large fortune (money previously given to her by Sir Patient), she looks forward to a new life with Wittmore.

== Reception ==
Sir Patient Fancy was successful with contemporary audiences, but some writers criticised it for perceived plagiarism and bawdiness. Behn responded to this criticism by downplaying Moliere's influence on her work, and arguing that her play would not have been accused of bawdiness if she had been a man.

The play's epilogue, spoken by the character Mrs. Gwin, has received significant attention from feminist writers. In it, Behn criticises those who damn her play because she is a woman, and suggests that women are in fact better writers of farce than men.
