= The Stepmother (1663 play) =

1663 play

- Original language: English
- Written by: Robert Stapylton
- Genre: Tragicomedy

Premiere
- Date: October 1663
- Place: Lincoln's Inn Fields Theatre, London

The Stepmother or The Step-Mother is a 1663 tragicomedy by the English writer Robert Stapylton. It was first staged by the Duke's Company, premiering at the Lincoln's Inn Fields Theatre.

The original cast included Samuel Sandford as Sylvanus, Thomas Betterton as Filamor, John Young as Adolph, Cave Underhill as Tetrick, Joseph Price as Fromund, William Smith as Crispus, Matthew Medbourne as Capito, Mary Betterton as Caesarina, Moll Davis as Violinda and Jane Long as Brianella.

== Bibliography ==
- Van Lennep, W. The London Stage, 1660-1800: Volume One, 1660-1700. Southern Illinois University Press, 1960.
