= The Siege of Babylon =

1677 play

- Original language: English
- Written by: Samuel Pordage
- Genre: Tragedy

Premiere
- Date: September 1677
- Place: Dorset Garden Theatre, London

The Siege of Babylon is a 1677 tragedy by the English writer Samuel Pordage. It was originally staged at the Dorset Garden Theatre by the Duke's Company.

The original cast included Thomas Betterton as Orontes, Matthew Medbourne as Lysimachus, Thomas Jevon as Eumenes, John Crosby as Ptolomy, William Smith as Perdicas, Henry Harris as Cassander, Henry Norris as Araxis, Mary Betterton as Statira, Mary Lee as Roxana and Anne Quin as Thalestris.

== Bibliography ==
- Van Lennep, W. The London Stage, 1660-1800: Volume One, 1660-1700. Southern Illinois University Press, 1960.
