= Robert Stapleton =

Robert Stapleton may refer to:

- Robert Stapylton, courtier and writer
- Robert Stapleton (MP) (died 1606) for Wells (UK Parliament constituency) and Yorkshire
