= The Morning Ramble =

1672 play

- Original language: English
- Written by: Henry Nevil Payne
- Genre: Comedy

Premiere
- Date: 4 November 1672
- Place: Dorset Garden Theatre, London

The Morning Ramble also known as The Mourning Ramble; Or, The Town-humours is a 1672 comedy play by the English writer Henry Nevil Payne. It was staged by the Duke's Company at the Dorset Garden Theatre with a cast that included Thomas Betterton as Townlove, Henry Harris as Merry, William Smith as Ruffle, Matthew Medbourne as Muchland, John Crosby as Rash, Cave Underhill as Fullam, Henry Norris as Breef, Jane Long as Betty Rash, Margaret Osborne as Lady Turnup and Anne Shadwell as Rose.

== Bibliography ==
- Van Lennep, W. The London Stage, 1660-1800: Volume One, 1660-1700. Southern Illinois University Press, 1960.
