= Epsom Wells =

1672 play

- Original language: English
- Written by: Thomas Shadwell
- Genre: Comedy

Premiere
- Date: 1672
- Place: Dorset Garden Theatre, London

Epsom Wells is a 1672 restoration comedy by the English writer Thomas Shadwell. It was the first in a line of plays set in spa towns. The incidental music was composed by Nicholas Staggins. In the 1690s Henry Purcell scored a new staging of the play. It was performed at the Dorset Garden Theatre by the Duke's Company. The cast included Henry Harris as Rains, Thomas Betterton as Bevil, William Smith as Woodly, Cave Underhill as Justice Clodpate, Anne Gibbs as Lucia, Mary Betterton as Mrs Jilt, James Nokes as Bisket and Edward Angel as Fribble.

It continued to be revived well into the eighteenth century.

== Bibliography ==
- Cavert, William The Smoke of London: Energy and Environment in the Early Modern City. Cambridge University Press, 2016.
- Orr, Bridget. British Enlightenment Theatre: Dramatizing Difference. Cambridge University Press, 2020.
- Van Lennep, W. The London Stage, 1660–1800: Volume One, 1660–1700. Southern Illinois University Press, 1960.
