= The Empress of Morocco =

1673 play

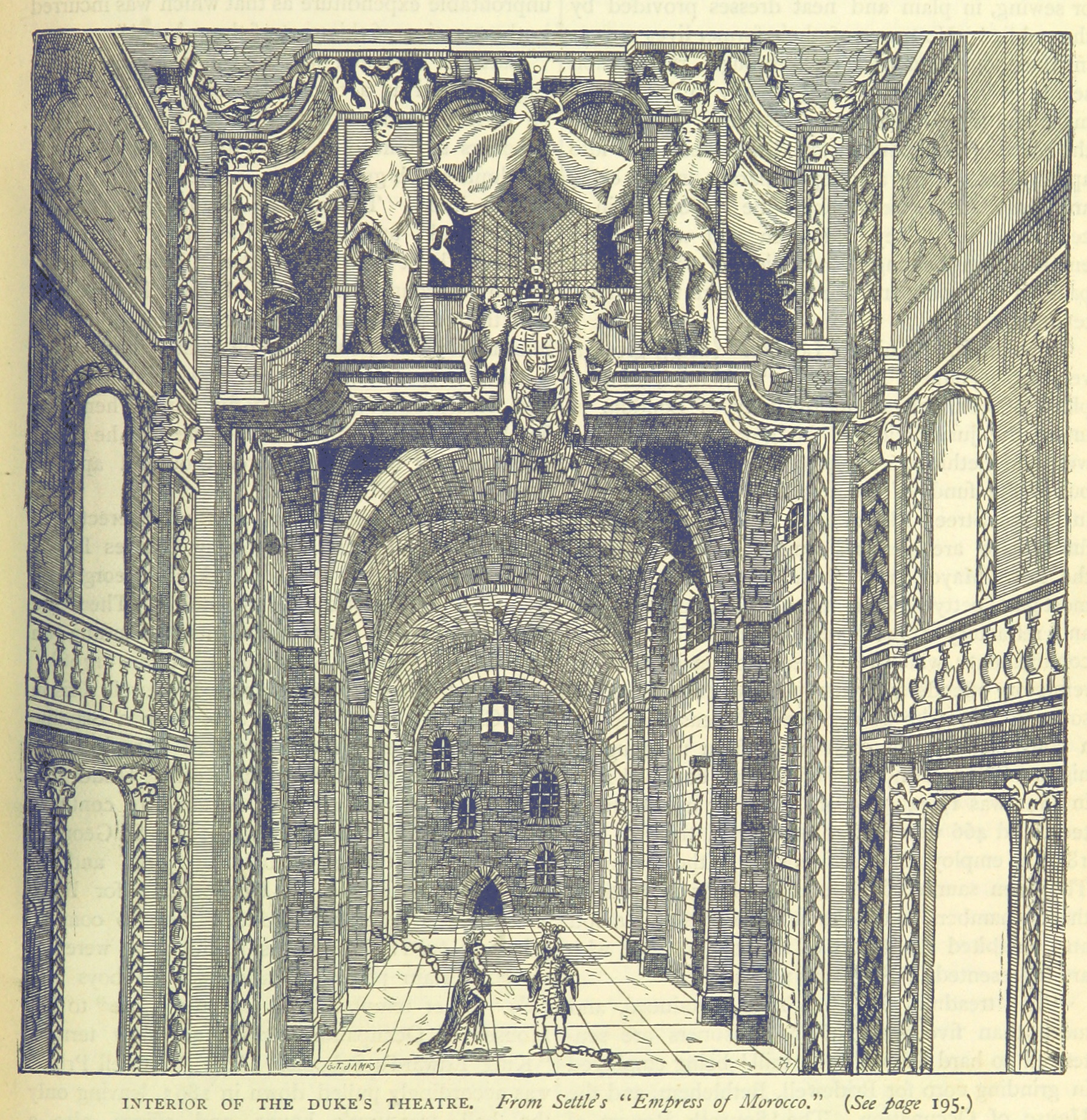
- A performance of Settle's play at the Dorset Garden Theatre.
- Original language: English
- Written by: Elkanah Settle
- Genre: Tragedy

Premiere
- Date: July 1673
- Place: Dorset Garden Theatre, London

The Empress of Morocco is a 1673 tragedy by the English writer Elkanah Settle. It was originally staged by the Duke's Company at the Dorset Garden Theatre in London. The cast included Henry Harris as Muly Labas, William Smith as Muly Hamet, Thomas Betterton as Grimalhaz, Matthew Medbourne as Hametalhaz, John Crosby as Abdelcador, Mary Betterton as Laula and Mary Lee as Mariamne. The published version was dedicated to Henry Howard, Earl of Norwich.

Thomas Duffett's The Empress of Morocco (1674) is a burlesque of Settle's tragedy.

== Plot ==
The play follows the villainous Laula's efforts to place her lover, Grimalhaz, on the Moroccan throne.

== Sequel ==
In 1682, Elkanah Settle's sequel to his play, titled The Heir of Morocco, premiered at the Theatre Royal in 1682 under the name The Emperor of Morocco.

== Bibliography ==
- Van Lennep, W. The London Stage, 1660-1800: Volume One, 1660-1700. Southern Illinois University Press, 1960.
