= The Villain (play) =

1662 play

- Original language: English
- Written by: Thomas Porter
- Genre: Tragedy

Premiere
- Date: 18 October 1662
- Place: Lincoln's Inn Fields Theatre, London

The Villain is a 1662 tragedy by the English writer Thomas Porter. It was originally staged by the Duke's Company at the Lincoln's Inn Fields Theatre in London. The first cast included Thomas Betterton as Monsieur Brisac, Henry Harris as Monsieur Beaupre, John Young as Bontefeu, Samuel Sandford as Maligni and Mary Betterton as Bellmont. William Davenant wrote the epilogue.

It has been described as the only genuine tragedy of the decade, given the fashion for tragicomedy. Sandford was acclaimed for his role of the villain, and the play was a popular success.
