= The Slighted Maid =

1663 play

- Original language: English
- Written by: Robert Stapylton
- Genre: Comedy

Premiere
- Date: 23 February 1663
- Place: Lincoln's Inn Fields Theatre, London

The Slighted Maid is a 1663 comedy play by the English writer Robert Stapylton.

It was staged by the Duke's Company at the Lincoln's Inn Fields Theatre in London. The cast included Henry Harris as Salerno, Thomas Betterton as Iberio, Matthew Medbourne as Filomarini, William Smith as Lugo, Philip Cademan as Arviedo, John Young as Corbulo, Cave Underhill as Peralta, James Nokes as Gioseppe, Samuel Sandford as Vindex, Anne Gibbs as Decio, Jane Long as Diacelia and Mary Betterton as Pyramena.

== Bibliography ==
- Fisk, Deborah Payne. The Cambridge Companion to English Restoration Theatre. Cambridge University Press, 2000,
- Nicoll, Allardyce. History of English Drama, 1660-1900: Volume 1, Restoration Drama, 1660-1700. Cambridge University Press, 1952.
- Roberts, David. Thomas Betterton: The Greatest Actor of the Restoration Stage. Cambridge University Press, 2010.
- Van Lennep, W. The London Stage, 1660-1800: Volume One, 1660-1700. Southern Illinois University Press, 1960.
