= The Comical Revenge =

1664 play

- Original language: English
- Written by: George Etherege
- Genre: Restoration Comedy

Premiere
- Date: March 1664
- Place: Lincoln's Inn Fields Theatre, London

The Comical Revenge; Or, Love In A Tub is a 1664 comedy play by the English writer George Etherege. First staged by the Duke's Company, it premiered at the Lincoln's Inn Fields Theatre. It is one of the earliest Restoration Comedies. The play holds importance for the literary historian for Etherege's employment of two separate language styles. The style employed in the verbal sparring between Sir Frederick and the Widow would set the standard for the language of the Restoration comedy. The subtitle refers to the comical subplot which deals with the locking up of Dufoy, servant of Sir Frederick, in a tub by the chambermaids Betty and Lettice.

The original cast included Thomas Betterton as Lord Beauford, Henry Harris as Sir Frederick Frollick, William Smith as Colonel Bruce, Henry Norris as Lovis, James Nokes as Sir Nicholas Cully, Cave Underhill as Palmer, Samuel Sandford as Wheadle, Mary Betterton as Graciana, Moll Davis as Aurelia and Jane Long as Widow.

== Bibliography ==
- Fisk, Deborah Payne & Canfield, J. Douglas Cultural Readings of Restoration and Eighteenth-Century English Theater. University of Georgia Press, 2010.
- Van Lennep, W. The London Stage, 1660-1800: Volume One, 1660-1700. Southern Illinois University Press, 1960.
