= She Would If She Could =

1668 play

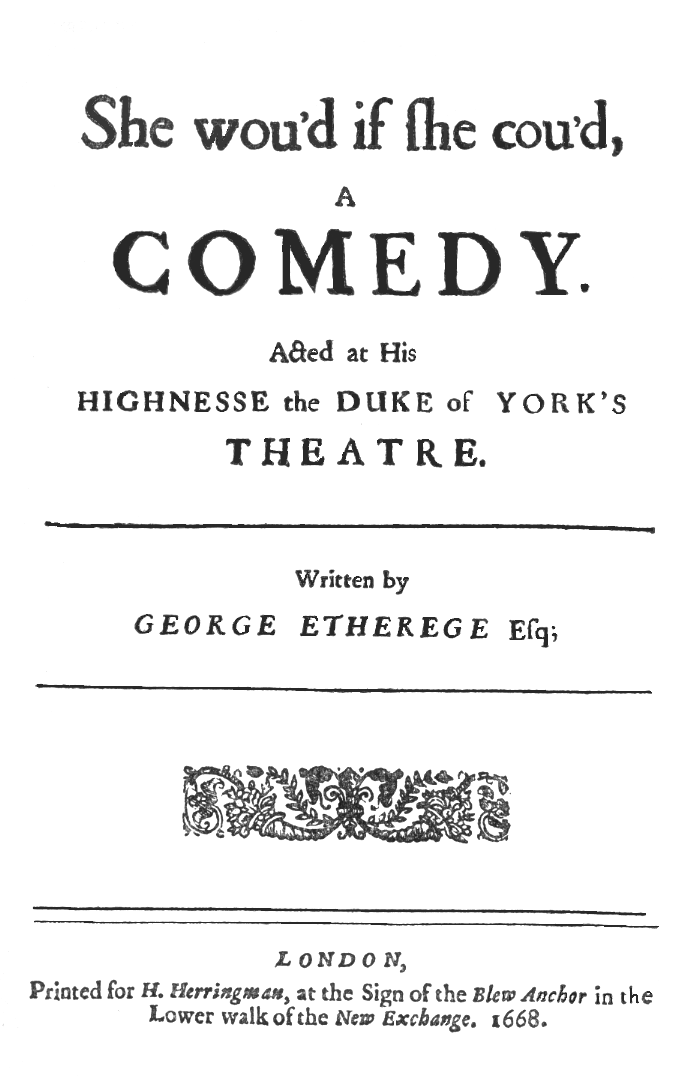
- Written by: George Etherege
- Original language: English
- Genre: Restoration Comedy

Premiere
- Date premiered: 6 February 1668
- Place premiered: Lincoln's Inn Fields Theatre, London

She Would If She Could is a 1668 comedy play by the English writer George Etherege. It was originally staged at the Lincoln's Inn Fields Theatre by the Duke's Company. The play's novelty lies in its shedding of the romantic verse element to attain a unified tone. The play deals with the lustfulness of Cockwood couple; the title referring to Lady Cockwood looking for an opportunity to cheat Sir Oliver Cockwood.

The original cast included William Smith as Courtall, John Young as Freeman, Henry Harris as Sir Joslin, James Nokes as Sir Oliver, Moll Davis as Getty and Anne Shadwell as Lady Cockwood.

== Plot ==
Act One opens as Mr Courtall and his friend, Mr Freeman, are discussing the wickedness of London. A servant arrives to announce that Courtall has a female visitor. To protect the lady's honour he hides Freeman in a cupboard. The female visitor is Mrs Sentry, the maid of the middle-aged Lady Cockwood. She has come to announce the arrival in town of her mistress and master, Sir Oliver Cockwood, and to arrange a tryst between her mistress and Courtall. She (falsely) claims that she is there without Lady Cockwood's knowledge. Sentry is thrown into a panic when Sir Oliver comes to call on Courtall. The latter hides Sentry in a different cupboard.

Sir Oliver has come to town for wine, women and pleasure after finding the country too dull. Courtall is not surprised but chastises him for breaking the heart of his “innocent” wife. Sir Oliver admits that she loves him too much, but it's OK as he will carry on behind her back, so she won't know. He then asks Courtall to try to persuade his wife to love him “a little less”. Courtall refuses to do so but agrees to dine with him and his friend Sir Joslin Jolley that evening.

After he leaves, Sentry comes out of her cupboard. She is shocked at her master's falseness in cheating on his wife, before returning to arranging the meeting of Lady Cockwood and Courtall for the same evening.

After she leaves, Freeman comes out of his cupboard. He is shocked that Courtall is going to meet both husband and wife on the same evening, before Courtall reveals that he has been repeatedly avoiding the advances of Lady Cockwood the whole time. He does not want to upset her, but not man above 16 is safe from her attempted advances.

The scene then changes to the Cockwood's home, where Lady Cockwood is overdramatically regretting sending Sentry to arrange it all. When Sentry returns she begins to tell her mistress of all that has occurred, before she can finish Lady Cockwood begins to wail at her misfortune at being discovered. Sentry then finishes her tale and Lady Cockwood reveals she knows all about Sir Oliver's carrying on with younger women, and is happy enough as it allows her time to chase younger men.

When Sir Oliver and Sir Joslin appear, Lady Cockwood feigns innocence and upset that her husband is going out for the evening without her. Sir Joslin tells her that they will not be out drinking. Sir Joslin's nieces, Ariana and Gatty arrive as Sir Oliver and their uncle depart. They notice that Lady Cockwood and Sentry are up to something. They agree they are both bored with being demure ladies and want to have some fun of their own. They agree to go in disguise to The Mulberry Gardens to find some young men to flirt with and break the hearts of.

Act Two opens with the arrival of Courtall and Freeman at The Mulberry Gardens, having left Sir Oliver too drunk to notice their absence. They are there to delay Courtall's unwanted liaison with Lady Cockwood. Ariana and Gatty, disguised, enter the gardens, and repeatedly pass the men trying to get them to follow them. Some confused chasing amongst the bushes occurs between various combinations of the 4 young people. The men also disguise their true identities. Eventually some flirty banter ensues, the two girls giving as good as they get in witty repartee. With much teasing, the girls arrange to meet the men the next day.

Meanwhile, Lady Cockwood is upset about Courtall's absence at the agreed time, and swears off him. When he appears this plan is swiftly abandoned for the original one of feigning knowledge of the meeting arranged by Mrs Sentry, who she sends out of the room. He continues to fend off her advances as he hasn't the time but agrees meeting the next day. Lady Cockwood then reprimands Sentry for leaving her alone with a man and risking her honour. Sentry (in aside to the audience) reveals that if she leaves the room she gets told off, but if she stays in the room she doesn't get spoken to for a week.

Ariana and Gatty arrive to be told off by Lady Cockwood for walking in The Mulberry Gardens without a chaperone and risking their honour. This is quickly overtaken by the drunken arrival of Sir Oliver, Sir Joslin, Courtall and Freeman. The latter two recognising the young women's clothing. Courtall is worried they will tell Lady Cockwood of his flirting.

A very drunk Sir Oliver rejects his wife's kiss, saying that he'd rather find himself a wench. Lady Cockwood goes into hysterics and the company sympathises with her as the innocent spouse. She whispers to Courtall that this scene will be very helpful in being free to sneak out to cheat on her husband with him. The four young people discuss their earlier meeting in The Mulberry Gardens.

Act Three begins the next day at The New Exchange (Britain's Bourse). Freeman offers to help Courtall avoid Lady Cockwood, whilst they pursue Ariana & Gatty. They agree that settling down is too boring. Freeman leaves and Lady Cockwood and Mrs Sentry arrive. Courtall asks her why she has brought her maid to their assignation. Hypocritically she says that she never goes anywhere without her and would deny herself all pleasures if it risked her reputation. She doesn't mind doing naughty things, but no one must suspect she does them. Ariana & Gatty arrive, the other two pretend to have met by chance. Courtall again postpones his meeting with Lady Cockwood until the next day. The young women tease him about their meeting at The Mulberry Garden. The party heads off to The Bear Inn.

Elsewhere Sir Joslin comes to call on Sir Oliver to take him to a party. However, Lady Cockwood has locked away all of his fine clothes except his Sunday church outfit, so he cannot go out to be seen by the young women of the town. Sir Joslin persuades him to come along to the party at The Bear Inn, which Lady Cockwood will never find out about.

On arriving at The Bear, Courtall assures Lady Cockwood that her husband will never know of their trip there. As they are shown to a room, the waiter mentions that Sir Joslin and Sir Oliver will be next door looking enjoying drinks and female company. Lady Cockwood doesn't want to be discovered, but also doesn't want her husband to get up to his tricks.

Sir Joslin and Sir Oliver arrive and head to their room to await the arrival of Sir Joslin's friend, Mr Rakehell, who is bringing the girls of easy virtue. When he arrives, Rakehell laughs at Sir Oliver's outfit. They swap clothes, for a moderate sum. Music and dancing begin and both parties end up mixed together, the ladies all in masks. When Lady Cockwood hears her husband boasting of him impending success with Rakehell's harlots, she feigns a fit and collapses. Sir Oliver realises who the women are, and his wife comes out of her fictitious faint and goes into an overly dramatic portrayal of the wronged wife and victim of all these goings on. She then reveals all her secret behaviours, but hypothetically, in her arguments towards her husband. She again relapses into a fake faint. Sir Oliver apologizes, whilst secretly arranging to meet the harlots the next day at the new Spring Gardens (the original name for Vauxhall Gardens).

Act Four opens with Lady Cockwood revealing a new plan to Sentry. She has sent fake letters from Ariana and Gatty to Courtall and Freeman arranging meetings. This is to test how true Courtall's affections are for her, based on whether he accepts the young girls invitation or not. Sir Oliver enters the room, and his wife feigns yet more innocence and devotion to him. He also feigns unfailing devotion to her. She tells him that she is only civil to Courtall because he is a friend of her husband but believes (or so she tells her husband) that he has misconstrued her politeness towards him as something more scandalous. This transpires to be a plan to keep him away from meeting Ariana and Gatty at the Cockwood home. The girls arrive on their way to Spring Gardens when Lady Cockwood tricks them into revealing that Courtall was with them in The Mulberry Garden the previous night, whilst damaging their opinion of him. After they leave, Lady Cockwood also heads to Spring Gardens to see whether Courtall will accept the fake invitation.

At Spring Gardens Sir Joslin, Sir Oliver and Rakehell are up to no good, drinking, singing and attempting to go wenching. Courtall and Freeman arrive and discover that the letters they both received are identical. They discuss his continued avoidance of Lady Cockwood, until interrupted by the arrival of Ariana and Gatty.

When they meet, the men believe (as they have arrived together) that the letters are genuine invites to meet. The girls on the other hand believe Lady Cockwood's version that the men are dishonourably in the gardens looking for fun with other women. A conversation of cross purposes ensues, that increasingly convinces and entrenches all parties in their assumptions, until one of them mentions the letters. Lady Cockwood and Sentry arrive, the discovery of their involvement with the letters is only avoided by the appearance of a drunk Sir Oliver attempting to fight Courtall to defend his wife's honour.

Act Five begins at the Cockwood home. Lady Cockwood is attempting to salvage the situation by obtaining the letters. Freeman comes to call, but in the middle of his visit Courtall arrives, so Freeman has to hide in the cupboard.

When Courtall asks what he has done to offend her and Sir Oliver, she flies into vague and overly dramatic denunciations of him and the harms he has done her. He is confused by her sudden change of heart towards him, but in the middle of his visit Sir Oliver returns home, so Courtall has to hide under the table.

Sir Oliver is very apologetic. His wife is more concerned that he may discover that she has two men hidden in the room. Whilst his back is turned, Courtall moves from under the table to the wardrobe with Freeman. Ariana and Gatty arrive at the house, and when left alone in the room put all the pieces together and work out that Lady Cockwood has been chasing Courtall and she, or Mrs Sentry, wrote the letters. The girls discover Courtall and Freeman in the wardrobe, who then come out. The girls take fright and run off, they are brought back in. The Cockwoods and Sentry come to see what the noise is all about. Sir Oliver assumes that the four young people are misbehaving, and its (rather hypocritically) shocked about men chasing young ladies about. Courtall lays the blame for their hiding at the feet of Sentry, by saying she hid them. Ignoring the fact that she herself hid them, Lady Cockwood expresses shock at how corruptible servants can be. Her husband is relieved that it was not his wife's doing (as he had correctly assumed).

Lady Cockwood then has to backtrack on her claims to her husband about the intentions of Courtall. As the handwriting of the letters is discovered to be Sentry's, Courtall claims they were part of Lady Cockwood's naive attempt to scare Ariana and Gatty away from anything dishonourable. She then has to backtrack on her claims to the girls about the intentions of Courtall.

Ariana and Gatty announce that had the letter been counterfeited by Courtall and Freeman, they were intent on counterfeiting Contracts of Marriage with them. The men agree to give up the high life in London and agree to marry, Courtall to Gatty and Freeman to Ariana.

Everyone urges Lady Cockwood to forgive Sentry (for her own actions) and take her back into service. She agrees, and the 2 women agree that after all the scrapes and near misses Lady Cockwood will now content herself with her own family instead of seeking the pleasures of the town. Sir Oliver too has had enough of wenching and the two agree to be faithful to each other.

== Dramatis Personae ==
Sir Oliver Cockwood - Country Knight

My Lady Cockwood - His Wife

Sir Joslin Jolly - Country Knight, friend of Sir Oliver

Mr Courtall - Honest Gentleman of The Town

Mr Freeman - Friend of Mr Courtall

Ariana & Gatty - Young Ladies and Relations of Sir Joslin

Mrs Sentry - My Lady Cockwood's Servant

Mr Rakewell - A knight of The Industry

Thomas - Sir Oliver's Servant

Mrs Gazette & Mrs Trinket - Two Exchange-Women

A Servant to Mr Courtall

Waiters, Fiddlers, and Other Attendants

== Bibliography ==
- Fisk, Deborah Payne & Canfield, J. Douglas Cultural Readings of Restoration and Eighteenth-Century English Theater. University of Georgia Press, 2010.
- Van Lennep, W. The London Stage, 1660-1800: Volume One, 1660-1700. Southern Illinois University Press, 1960.
