= Friendship in Fashion =

1678 play

- Original language: English
- Written by: Thomas Otway
- Genre: Restoration Comedy
- Setting: London, present day

Premiere
- Date: 5 April 1678
- Place: Dorset Garden Theatre, London

Friendship in Fashion is a 1678 comedy play by the English writer Thomas Otway. It was first staged by the Duke's Company at the Dorset Garden Theatre in London. It was part of the trend of Restoration Comedy that flourished during the era.

The original Dorset Garden cast included Thomas Betterton as Goodvile, William Smith as Truman, Henry Harris as Valentine, Cave Underhill as Sir Noble Clumsey, Anthony Leigh as Malagene, Thomas Jevon as Caper, John Bowman as Saunter, Elizabeth Barry as Mrs Goodvile, Anne Shadwell as Victoria, Emily Price as Camilla and Anne Quin as Lady Squeamish. Otway dedicated the published version to the Earl of Dorset.

== Synopsis ==
Goodvile, a fast-living man about town, attempts to cast off his mistress Victoria on his best friend Truman while seducing another woman Camilla before palming her off on another friend Valentine. When the two men find out about this they decide to take revenge by seducing Goodvile's attractive young wife. In turn, another of Goodvile's former paramours, Lady Squeamish, seeks her own revenge after being abandoned for the younger Camilla.

== Bibliography ==
- Canfield, J. Douglas. Tricksters and Estates: On the Ideology of Restoration Comedy. University Press of Kentucky, 2014.
- Van Lennep, W. The London Stage, 1660-1800: Volume One, 1660-1700. Southern Illinois University Press, 1960.
