= The Wrangling Lovers =

1676 play

- Original language: English
- Written by: Edward Ravenscroft
- Genre: Restoration Comedy

Premiere
- Date: 24 July 1676
- Place: Dorset Garden Theatre, London

The Wrangling Lovers; Or, The Invisible Mistress is a 1676 comedy play by the English writer Edward Ravenscroft.

It premiered at the Dorset Garden Theatre, performed by the Duke's Company with a cast that included Anthony Leigh as Count de Benevent, William Smith as Don Diego de Sluniga, Matthew Medbourne as Don Ruis de Moncado, Henry Harris as Don Gusmun, Cave Underhill as Sanco, Thomas Percival as Ordgano, Margaret Hughes as Octavia, Elizabeth Barry as Elvira and Anne Shadwell as Beatrice.

== Bibliography ==
- Canfield, J. Douglas. Tricksters and Estates: On the Ideology of Restoration Comedy. University Press of Kentucky, 2014.
- Van Lennep, W. The London Stage, 1660-1800: Volume One, 1660-1700. Southern Illinois University Press, 1960.
