= Joseph Harris (17th-century actor) =

British actor and dramatist

- Occupations: Actor and dramatist

Joseph Harris (fl. 1661–1699) was a British actor and dramatist.

== Biography ==
Harris joined the king's company of players at the Theatre Royal. He and three others are said by Downes (Roscius Anglicanus, p. 2) to have been bred up from boys under the master actors. The ‘History of the Stage,’ ascribed to Betterton, says ‘Mr. Harris was bred a seal-cutter,’ words which suggest a near relationship with Henry Harris, chief engraver to the mint. So late as 1690 Harris played Colonel Downright in ‘Widow Ranter,’ by Mrs. Behn. He obtained little reputation in his profession, and on the accession of Queen Anne was appointed engraver to the mint. Giles Jacob says by the assistance of his friends he arrived at being an author (Lives and Characters, i. 129), and assigns him two plays:

‘The Mistakes, or the False Report,’ a tragi-comedy, 4to, 1691, acted at the Theatre Royal in 1690 by a company including Mountfort and Mrs. Bracegirdle. This is a poor piece as regards plot and language, which according to Jacob was composed by another person and consigned to Harris, who spoiled it. ‘The City Bride, or the Merry Cuckold,’ 4to, 1696. This comedy, taken without acknowledgment from Webster's ‘Cure for a Cuckold,’ failed on the first representation. To these works the ‘Biographia Dramatica’ adds (3) ‘Love's a Lottery and a Woman the Prize,’ 4to, 1699, to which is annexed (4) a masque, ‘Love and Riches Reconcil'd,’ both performed in 1699 at Lincoln's Inn Fields. The plot of the former, according to Genest (ii. 171), is ‘improbable, but some parts of the dialogue are not bad.’ The masque is unmentioned in Genest.
