= Sir Martin Mar-all =

Restoration comedy by John Dryden

Sir Martin Mar-all, or The Feign'd Innocence is an English Restoration comedy by John Dryden, first performed on 15 August 1667. Based on a translation of L'Étourdi by Molière, it was one of Dryden's earliest comedies, and also one of the greatest theatrical successes of his career.

The play's 1666 entry into the Stationers' Register assigned it to William Cavendish, 1st Duke of Newcastle. John Downes, in his Roscius Anglicanus (1708), maintained that Newcastle executed "a bare translation" of Molière's play, which was revised and adapted by Dryden. The play was first published in quarto in 1668, in an anonymous volume, which was re-issued in 1678; a third edition in 1691 carried Dryden's name, and the play was included in the 1695 edition of Dryden's collected works.

The initial production of the play was a huge success; it ran for thirty-two performances and was acted four times at Court. Samuel Pepys saw the play seven times, and called it "the most entire piece of mirth...that certainly was ever writ." According to Downes, the play made "more money than any preceding comedy" at the Duke of York's Theatre. Sir Martin Mar-all was referenced by other poets for the foolishness of the title character, who, in order to impress his mistress Millicent, mimes playing a lute and lip-syncs while another character makes music from within. Of course, he continues lip-syncing and strumming his quiet lute after the true player ceases to make any sounds and exposes himself as a fraud. The original Dorset Garden Theatre cast included James Nokes as Sir Martin Marall, William Smith as Sir John Swallow, John Young as Lord Dartmouth, Cave Underhill as Old Moody and Henry Harris as Warner.

In addition to Newcastle's translation of Molière, Dryden also adapted material from L'Amant Indiscrit by Philippe Quinault, from the Francion of Charles Sorel, and from The Antiquary by Shackerley Marmion.
