= City Politiques =

1683 play

- Original language: English
- Written by: John Crowne
- Genre: Restoration Comedy
- Setting: Naples, 1616–1620

Premiere
- Date: 19 January 1683
- Place: Theatre Royal, Drury Lane, London

City Politiques is a 1683 comedy play by the English writer John Crowne. It was first performed by the United Company at the Theatre Royal, Drury Lane by the recently formed United Company. The original cast are not known.

It came at the time of the Tory Reaction to the earlier Popish Plot and Exclusion Crisis, and was of numerous plays of the time that ridiculed the Whig party. It is set during the 1610s in the southern Italian city of Naples, then under Spanish rule.

== Bibliography ==
- Johnson, Odai. Rehearsing the Revolution: Radical Performance, Radical Politics in the English Restoration. University of Delaware Press, 2000.
- Van Lennep, W. The London Stage, 1660-1800: Volume One, 1660-1700. Southern Illinois University Press, 1960.
- White, Arthur Franklin. John Crowne: His Life and Dramatic Works. Routledge, 2019.
