= The Adventures of Five Hours =

1663 play

- Original language: English
- Written by: Samuel Tuke
- Genre: Comedy

Premiere
- Date: 8 January 1663
- Place: Lincoln's Inn Fields Theatre, London

The Adventures of Five Hours is a 1663 comedy play by the English writer Sir Samuel Tuke, 1st Baronet. Based on the play Los empenos de seis horas by Antonio Coello, It is an early example of the developing Restoration comedy tradition. Its success led to a series of sentimental plays in the Spanish style about love and honour, very different to the more sophisticated and cynical comedies which the Restoration era became known for.

Performed by The Duke's Company, it premiered at the Lincoln's Inn Fields Theatre in London. The original cast included Thomas Betterton as Don Henriq, Henry Harris as Antonio, Cave Underhill as Diego, Samuel Sandford as Ernesto, William Smith as Corrigidor, John Young as Octavio, Hester Davenport as Camilla, Jane Long as Flora and Mary Betterton as Portia. It ran for thirteen straight performances, a considerable hit by the time.

== Bibliography ==
- Fisk, Deborah Payne. The Cambridge Companion to English Restoration Theatre. Cambridge University Press, 2000,
- Nicoll, Allardyce. History of English Drama, 1660-1900: Volume 1, Restoration Drama, 1660-1700. Cambridge University Press, 1952.
- Roberts, David. Thomas Betterton: The Greatest Actor of the Restoration Stage. Cambridge University Press, 2010.
- Van Lennep, W. The London Stage, 1660-1800: Volume One, 1660-1700. Southern Illinois University Press, 1960.
