= The Carnival (play) =

Play by Thomas Porter

The Carnival is a play by Thomas Porter performed at the Theatre Royal by His Majesties Servants in London in the spring of 1664 with some success. The play may be an adaptation of a Spanish original, though no specific source has been identified.
