= The Ambitious Statesman =

1679 play

- Original language: English
- Written by: John Crowne
- Genre: Tragedy

Premiere
- Date: March 1679
- Place: Theatre Royal, Drury Lane, London

The Ambitious Statesman; Or, The Loyal Favourite is a 1679 tragedy by the English writer John Crowne. It was originally staged by the King's Company at the Theatre Royal, Drury Lane in London. The original cast is unknown except for Joseph Haines who played La Marre, and also spoke the epilogue.

== Characters ==
- Charles, King of France
- The Dauphin
- The Constable of France
- The Duke of Vendosme
- Count Brisas
- Count La Force
- La Marre
- Mademoiselle De Guise
- La Guard

== Bibliography ==
- Jenkinson, Matthew. Culture and Politics at the Court of Charles II, 1660-1685. Boydell & Brewer, 2010.
- Van Lennep, W. The London Stage, 1660-1800: Volume One, 1660-1700. Southern Illinois University Press, 1960.
- White, Arthur Franklin. John Crowne: His Life and Dramatic Works. Routledge, 2019.
