= Antonio Coello =

Spanish dramatist and poet

Antonio Coello (26 October 1611, Madrid – 20 October 1652, Madrid) was a Spanish dramatist and poet. He entered the household of the Duke of Alburquerque, and after some years of service in the army received the Order of Santiago in 1648. He was a favorite of Philip IV, who is reported to have collaborated with him; this rumour is not confirmed, but there is ample proof of Coello's collaboration with Calderón, Rojas Zorrilla, Solis and Velez de Guevara, the most distinguished dramatists of the age.

According to the Encyclopædia Britannica Eleventh Edition, the best of his original plays, Los Empenos de seis horas, "is an excellent example of stagecraft and animated dialogue." It has been wrongly ascribed to Calderón; it was adapted by Samuel Tuke, under the title of The Adventures of Five Hours, and was described by Pepys as superior to Othello. Coello died on 20 October 1652, shortly after his nomination to a post in the household of Philip IV.

== Works ==
- El conde de Sex, o Dar la vida por su dama 1638
- El celoso extremeno
- Los dos Fernandos de Austria 1646
- No Sooner Said than Done 1650
- La adúltera castigada
- Peor es hurgarlo
- Los empenos de seis horas — Samuel Tuke's Restoration adaptation (The Adventures of Five Hours) reprinted in Robert Dodsley's Select Collection of Old Plays Vol 12 at the Internet Archive
