= Thomas Porter (dramatist) =

Thomas Porter (1636 – 1680) was an English dramatist and duellist.

== Life ==
He was the fourth son of Endymion Porter and his wife Olivia Boteler, and brother of George Porter.

Porter abducted, on 24 February 1655, Anne Blount, daughter of Mountjoy Blount, 1st Earl of Newport. For this, he was for a short time imprisoned, and the contract of marriage was declared null and void by the quarter sessions of Middlesex on 17 July following. A valid marriage subsequently took place, and they had a son George. On 26 March of the same year, Porter killed a soldier named Thomas Salkeld in Covent Garden, probably in a duel, and was consequently tried for murder. He pleaded guilty to manslaughter, was allowed benefit of clergy, and was sentenced to be burned in the hand.

On 28 July 1667, Porter had a duel with his friend, Sir Henry Belasyse, fully documented by Samuel Pepys, who remarked on the "silliness of the quarrel". Belasyse was mortally wounded, and Porter, who was also hurt, had to leave the country. The coroner's jury were later ordered to find that the cause of death was unknown. Porter subsequently married Roberta Anne Colepeper, daughter of Thomas Colepeper, 2nd Baron Colepeper

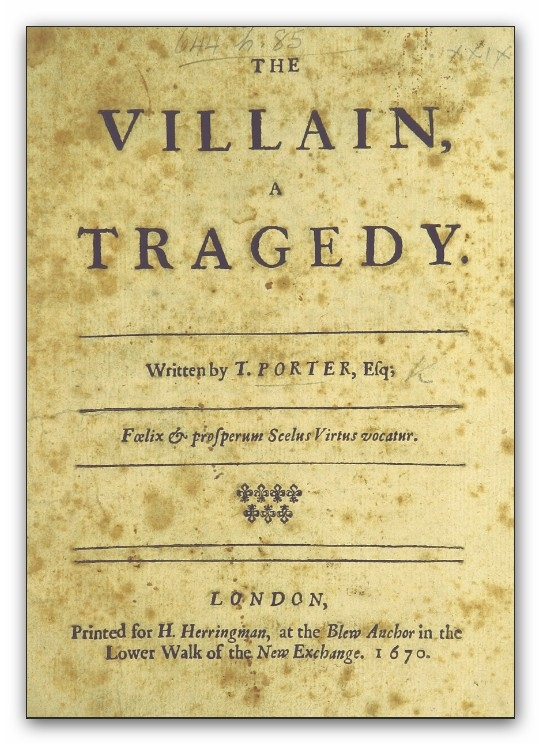

== Works ==
He was the author of the following plays:

- The Villain, a tragedy, 1663, 1670, 1694. This play was acted at the Duke's Theatre in October 1662 for ten nights in succession to crowded houses. Its success was chiefly owing to Samuel Sandford's performance of the part of Maligni. The epilogue to this play was written by Sir William Davenant and was printed in his works.
- The Witty Combat, or The Female Victor, a Trage-comedy, 1663.
- The Carnival, a comedy, 1664; acted at the Theatre Royal.
- The French Conjuror, a comedy, 1667: acted at Dorset Garden
