= Sir Samuel Tuke, 1st Baronet =

English officer in the Royalist army and playwright

Sir Samuel Tuke, 1st Baronet (c.1615, in Essex – 26 January 1674, in Somerset House, London) was an English officer in the Royalist army during the English Civil War and a notable playwright. He is best known for his 1663 play The Adventures of Five Hours, possibly co-authored by George Digby – the play (an adaptation of a Spanish work by Antonio Coello) was produced by the Duke's Company and later proved an influence on Richard Brinsley Sheridan's opera The Duenna.

== Life ==
The third son of George Tuke, Samuel was admitted to Gray's Inn in 1635 and had fought in Europe before the Civil War broke out in 1640. By late 1642 he was a major in the Duke of York's Regiment, serving with William Cavendish's northern army and fighting at the battle of Marston Moor. He then served in western England in 1645 under the command of George Goring before resigning his commission after he was passed over for promotion to major-general of horse in favour of Goring's brother-in-law George Porter. He tried to force Porter into a duel but the council of war instead forced him into an apology. He then defended Colchester in 1648, acting as one of its occupants' commissioners on the surrender and then going into exile with Prince Charles (later Charles II) in France throughout the Protectorate. There he met John Evelyn, attended on Charles's younger brother Henry Stuart and became known as a duellist and a wit. He tried to become Henry's governor but instead was recommended to Charles as James, Duke of York's secretary by their mother Queen Henrietta Maria, though Charles and Edward Hyde vetoed such an appointment. By 1659 at the latest Tuke had also converted to Roman Catholicism.

On the Restoration, Tuke remained a favourite of Charles II, who made him a knight and a baronet in 1664. He was also sent to the French court in 1661 with Charles's condolences for the death of Cardinal Mazarin. 1661 also saw the first edition of his play The Adventures of Five Hours - this was based on the Spanish comedy Los empeños de seis horas, which Charles II had suggested Tuke adapt and produce in English. Its premiere was on 8 January 1663 at Lincoln's Inn Fields - this was attended by Samuel Pepys, who called it "the best, for the variety and the most excellent continuance of the plot to the very end, that ever I saw or think ever shall" and "the best play that ever I read in my life", thinking it superior to Othello. A catalogue of publications of Henry Herringman published in 1684 also mentions Tuke as one of the authors of the 1664 Pompey the Great. He was one of the first members of the Royal Society (publishing a history of the breeding of green Colchester oysters in the Transactions of the Royal Society) and backed loyal Catholics in the house of Lords (advocating their claims to remission of the penal laws). He died in 1674 at Somerset House and was buried in its chapel.

== Marriage and issue ==
He married twice:

1. in 1664, to Mary Guldeford (died 1666, Paris), who died in childbirth.
2. in 1668, to Mary Sheldon (died 1705, Portugal), a dresser to Charles II's queen Catherine of Braganza – she was accused of interfering with a witness to the Popish Plot in 1679 and after Charles's death returned to Portugal with Catherine in 1692. The couple's children included Charles Tuke (1671–1690), the eldest son, who died of wounds sustained at the Battle of the Boyne whilst fighting on the Jacobite side as a captain in Tyrconnell's Horse.

== Sources ==
- Dictionary of National Biography article

Baronetage of England
New creation	Baronet (of Cressing Temple); 1664–1674	Succeeded by Charles Tuke
