= Henry Nevil Payne =

Henry Nevil Payne (died 1710?) was a dramatist and agitator for the Roman Catholic cause in Scotland and England. He wrote The Fatal Jealousy (1672), The Morning Ramble (1672), and The Siege of Constantinople (1675). After he finished writing plays, he was heavily involved in the Montgomery Plot in 1689, and was captured and put to two days torture on 10 December 1690, in the last legal use of "judicial torture" in the United Kingdom. According to the Earl of Crawford, who supervised the torture and wrote about it to the Earl of Melville later in the week, Payne was subjected to the thumbscrews and to "the boot" but revealed no information. He was perhaps the last person to be legally tortured in Scotland before the practice was formerly abolished under the Treason Act 1708. He was finally released in February 1701, and commenced further plotting. His fate is unknown; Montague Summers's The Works of Aphra Behn suggests 1710 for his death date, but offers no cite.
