= George Etherege =

English playwright (c. 1636 – c. 1691)

Sir George Etherege
- Born: c. 1636; Probably Maidenhead, Berkshire, England
- Died: c. 1691; Paris, France
- Occupations: Playwright, poet
- Relatives: George Etherege (grandfather); George Etherege (father); Mary Etherege, née Powney (mother)
- Writing career
- Movement: English Restoration Comedy

Sir George Etherege (c. 1636 – c. 10 May 1692) was an English dramatist. He wrote the plays The Comical Revenge or, Love in a Tub in 1664, She Would If She Could in 1668, and The Man of Mode or, Sir Fopling Flutter in 1676.

== Biography ==
=== Early life ===
George Etherege was born in Maidenhead, Berkshire, in about 1636, to George Etherege and Mary Powney, as the eldest of their six children. Educated at Lord Williams's School, where a school building was later named after him, he was rumoured to have attended the University of Cambridge, although John Dennis states that to his certain knowledge Etherege understood neither Greek nor Latin, thus raising doubts that he could have been there.

Etherege served as an apprentice to a lawyer and later studied law at Clement's Inn, London, one of the Inns of Chancery. He probably travelled abroad to France with his father, who stayed with the exiled queen Henrietta Maria, and may have witnessed in Paris performances of some of Molière's earliest comedies. An allusion in one of his plays suggests he may have been personally acquainted with Roger de Rabutin, Comte de Bussy.

=== Stage success ===
Soon after the Restoration in 1660, Etherege wrote his comedy of The Comical Revenge or Love in a Tub, which brought him to the attention of Lord Buckhurst, afterwards Earl of Dorset. This was performed at the Duke's Theatre in 1664 and a few copies were printed in the same year. It is partly in rhymed heroic verse, like the stilted tragedies of the Howards and Thomas Killigrew, but it contains comic scenes that are notably bright and fresh. The sparring between Sir Frederick and the Widow introduced a style of wit hitherto unknown upon the English stage.

The success of this play was very great, but Etherege waited four years before repeating the experiment. Meanwhile he gained a high reputation as a poetical beau and moved in the circle of Sir Charles Sedley, Lord Rochester and other noble wits of the day. His temperament is best shown by the names his contemporaries gave him: "gentle George" and "easy Etheredge".

In 1668, he brought out She Would If She Could, a comedy of action, wit and spirit, although by some thought to be frivolous and immoral. Here Etherege first showed himself as a new power in literature. He presents an airy and fantastic world, where flirtation is the only serious business in life. Etherege himself was living a life no less frivolous and unprincipled.

=== The Man of Mode ===
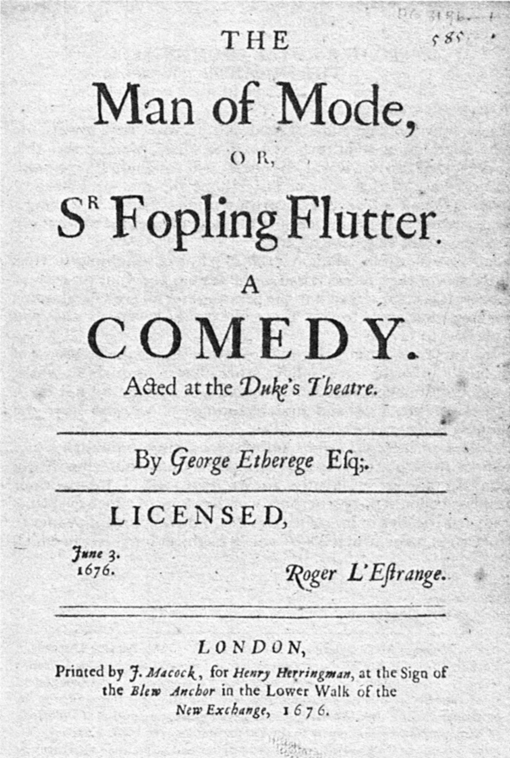
Frontispiece to The Man of Mode (1676)

Between 1668 and 1671 Etherege went to Constantinople as secretary to the English Ambassador, Sir Daniel Harvey. After a silence of eight years, he came forward with only one further play: The Man of Mode or, Sir Fopling Flutter, widely considered the best comedy of manners written in England before the days of William Congreve. It was acted and printed in 1676 and enjoyed success, which may be attributed to the belief that it satirises, or at least refers to well-known contemporaries in London. Sir Fopling Flutter was seen as a portrait of Beau Hewit, the reigning exquisite, Dorimant to be a reference to the Earl of Rochester, and Medley a portrait of Etherege himself (or equally plausible, his fellow playwright and wit, Sir Charles Sedley). Even the drunken shoemaker was a real character, who made his fortune from being brought to public notice in this fashion.

== Merry Gang ==
Etherege was part of the Merry Gang (as Andrew Marvell described them). The Merry Gang flourished for about 15 years after 1665 and included John Wilmot, 2nd Earl of Rochester; Henry Jermyn; Charles Sackville, Earl of Dorset; John Sheffield, Earl of Mulgrave; Henry Killigrew; Sir Charles Sedley; the playwright William Wycherley; and George Villiers, 2nd Duke of Buckingham. The Merry Gang were advocates of libertinism. Members of the gang asserted the right to behave as they pleased and their antics were intended to draw the attention and amusement of the king. Rochester claimed his aim was to halt "the strange decay of manly parts since the days of dear Harry the Second [r. 1154–1189]". The gang engaged in acts that were loud, outraged public decency and often included violence against women.

In 1676, Rochester and Etherege were involved in a brawl with the watch in Epsom that left a Captain Downs dead. At different times, Sedley and Buckhurst both paid Nell Gwyn, long-time mistress of the king, £100 a year to live with them; she also spent a period living with Rochester. Gwyn's 1679 funeral was attended by all of the gang.

=== Life after the theatre ===
Etherege was part of the circle of John Wilmot; both men had a daughter by the unmarried actress Elizabeth Barry. (All three appeared as characters in the 2005 film The Libertine, based on a play by Stephen Jeffreys.)

After his success, Etherege retired from literature, and a few years later lost much of his fortune to gambling. He was knighted at some time before 1679, and married a wealthy widow, Mary Sheppard Arnold. In March 1685, he was appointed resident minister to the Imperial German Court at Ratisbon. After three-and-a-half years' residence there, and after the Glorious Revolution, he left for Paris to join James II in exile. He died in Paris, probably in 1691, as Narcissus Luttrell notes this as a recent event in February 1692, identifying Sir George Etherege as the late King James's Ambassador to Vienna.

Etherege's manuscript despatches are preserved in the British Museum, where they were discovered and described by Gosse in 1881. Later editions were produced by Sybil Rosenfeld (1928) and Frederic Bracher (1974).

=== Legacy ===
Etherege holds a distinguished place in English literature as one of the "big five" in Restoration comedy, who invented the comedy of manners and led the way to the achievements of Congreve and Sheridan.

Etherege's portraits of fops and beaux are considered to be the best of their kind. He is noted for his delicate touches of dress, furniture and scene, and a vivid replication of the fine airs of London gentlemen and ladies which may even better Congreve's. His biography was first written in detail by Edmund Gosse in Seventeenth Century Studies (1883).
