= Robert Stapylton =

English writer (died 1669)

Sir Robert Stapylton or Stapleton (died 1669) was an English courtier, dramatic poet and translator.

== Life ==
Stapylton was the third son of Richard Stapleton of Carlton by Snaith, Yorkshire, by Elizabeth, daughter of Sir Henry Pierrepont of Holme Pierrepont. He was educated in the Benedictine convent of St. Gregory at Douai, where he became a professed monk of the order on 30 March 1625. He left the Benedictines, turned Protestant, and was appointed one of the gentlemen in ordinary of the privy chamber to Prince Charles. He followed the king when Charles left London at the outbreak of the First English Civil War, and was knighted at Nottingham on 13 September 1642. After the battle of Edgehill he accompanied the king to Oxford, where he was created D.C.L. in November 1642. He remained at Oxford until its surrender to Thomas Fairfax in May 1645. Under the Commonwealth he lived a studious life, and at the Restoration he was made one of the Gentleman Ushers to the Privy Chamber.

Stapylton died on 10 or 11 July 1669, and was buried on the 15th near the vestry door of Westminster Abbey. His will, dated 11 June 1669, was proved on 29 July by Elizabeth Simpson of Westminster, widow, to whom he left the bulk of his estate (although he had a wife living, whom he barely mentioned) in consideration, as he alleged, of the great care she had taken of him during his long illness. His wife was a Mrs. Hammond, widow (born Mainwaring).

== Works ==
For the stage Stapylton wrote:

- The Royal Choice, a play entered in the register of the Stationers' Company, 29 November 1653. No copy of this appears to have been preserved.
- The Slighted Maid, London, 1663, a comedy, in five acts and in verse, which Samuel Pepys saw acted at the Duke's House, Lincoln's Inn Fields, on coronation day, 20 May 1663. The cast included the Bettertons, Cave Underhill, and other well-known actors. John Genest styles it "a pretty good comedy" in his History of the Stage.
- The Stepmother, London, 1664, a tragi-comedy, in five acts and in verse, acted at Lincoln's Inn Fields by the Duke of York's servants on 28 May 1663. The cast was much the same as for the preceding play, but Genest says "the serious scenes of it are bad".
- The Tragedie of Hero and Leander, London, 1669, in five acts and in verse. ‘This is an indifferent tragedy—it is founded on the poem of Musæus—the original story being very simple, Stapylton was obliged to make large additions to it in order to form 5 acts—he has not been happy in these additions’ (Genest). It was never acted.

Stapylton published the following translations:

- Pliny's Panegyricke: a Speech in the Senate, wherein publick Thanks are presented to the Emperor Trajan, Oxford, 1644, from the Latin of Pliny the younger, illustrated with annotations.
- The first Six Satyrs of Juvenal … with annotations clearing the obscure places out of History, Laws, and Ceremonies of the Romans, Oxford, 1644. Dr. Bartholomew Holyday used to claim that Stapleton made use of his translation of Juvenal, having borrowed it in manuscript.
- The Loves of Hero and Leander: a Greek poem [by Musæus] translated into English verse, with annotations upon the original, Oxford, 1645; London, 1647.
- Juvenal's Sixteen Satyrs [translated in verse]. Or, a Survey of the Manners and Actions of Mankind. With arguments, marginal notes, and annotations, London, 1647; 1660; 1673.
- Translation of Famiano Strada's De Bello Belgico, or The History of the Low-Countrey Warres, London, 1650 and 1667.

Stapylton wrote verses: before Samuel Harding's Sicily and Naples, a play, 1640; before Henry Carey, 2nd Earl of Monmouth's Romulus and Tarquine, 1648; before William Cartwright's Comedies, 1651; before Edmund Gayton's "Case of Longevity", 1659; and some left in manuscript.

Gerard Langbaine states that Stapylton executed the translations of Melchior de Marmet's Entertainments of the Cours; or Academical Conversations, 1658, and of Cyrano de Bergerac's Σεληναρχία, or the Government of the World in the Moon, 1659, both published under the name of Thomas Saint Serf. Thompson Cooper, however, writing in the Dictionary of National Biography, considers that the real translator was Thomas Sydserf or Saint Serfe, son of the Scottish bishop Thomas Sydserf.
