= Edward Howard (playwright) =

British writer (bap. 1624–1712)

Edward Howard (baptised 1624 – 1712) was an English dramatist and author of the Restoration era. He was the fifth son of Thomas Howard, 1st Earl of Berkshire, and one of four playwriting brothers: Sir Robert Howard, Colonel Henry Howard, and James Howard were the others. The brothers were sometimes confused in their own era, and Edward was sometimes given credit for his brother Henry's play The United Kingdoms.

== Biography ==
Edward Howard was christened on 2 November 1624, at St. Martin-in-the-Fields.

Howard had a reputation as an exacting and difficult author. In their famous satire The Rehearsal, the Duke of Buckingham and his collaborators mocked Howard for being demanding and contentious during the actors' rehearsals of his plays. Howard himself acknowledged his reputation; he wrote a Prologue to his Man of Newmarket in which the actors Robert Shatterell and Joseph Haynes criticize Howard for not allowing cuts or improvisations in his dramas. Howard complained that when the actors in his Six Days' Adventure encountered a hostile audience response, they neglected "that diligence required to their parts."

He has been described as "the arrogant, touchy Edward Howard." He "seems to have struck his contemporaries as the epitome of the literary fop...." In a quarrel over the Change of Crowns matter, actor and fellow playwright John Lacy reportedly called Howard "more a fool than a poet." Howard slapped Lacy's face with his glove, and Lacy cracked Howard over the head with his cane.

Charles Sackville, 6th Earl of Dorset wrote his Satire on a Conceited Playwright about Edward Howard; Dorset called Howard's poetry "solid nonsense that abides all tests." Thomas Shadwell caricatured Howard as the "poet Ninny" in his first play, The Sullen Lovers (1668). Alexander Pope included a mention of him in The Dunciad, Book 1, line 297.

== Plays ==
His best drama is arguably The Change of Crowns. Samuel Pepys saw it on 15 April 1667, performed by the King's Company at the Theatre Royal, Drury Lane; in his Diary Pepys called it "the best that I ever saw at that house, being a great play and serious." During the première performance of the play, however, cast member John Lacy improvised some lines that offended King Charles II, who had Lacy incarcerated in response. As a result of the controversy, The Change of Crowns was not published in its own era.

Howard's other plays were treated roughly by the critics of the day. Restoration dramatists often reworked the plays of earlier playwrights; "Ned" Howard was accused of relying on work by James Shirley.

His five plays are:

- The Usurper, 1664 (printed 1668)
- The Change of Crowns, 1667
- The Women's Conquest, 1670 (printed 1671)
- The Six Days' Adventure, 1671 (printed 1671)
- The Man of Newmarket, 1678 (printed 1678)

== Poems and miscellany ==
- The Brittish Princes: an Heroick Poem, 1669
- Poems and Essays, with a Paraphrase on Cicero's Laelius, 1673
- Spencer Redivivus, 1687
- Caroloiades, or the Rebellion of Forty-One, 1689
