= John Crowne =

17th/18th-century English dramatist (1641–1712)

John Crowne (6 April 1641 – 1712) was a British dramatist.

His father "Colonel" William Crowne, accompanied the earl of Arundel on a diplomatic mission to Vienna in 1637, and wrote an account of his journey. He emigrated to Nova Scotia where he received a grant of land from Cromwell, but the French took possession of his property, and the home government did nothing to uphold his rights.

== Biography ==
He was born in London on 6 April 1641, and emigrated to Nova Scotia in 1657 with his father, a joint proprietor of the colony, aboard the ship Satisfaction, and studied at Harvard College. While studying at Harvard, Crowne lived with Puritan divine John Norton. Crowne left without graduating, however, and returned to England with his father in 1660.

When the son came to England his poverty compelled him to act as gentleman usher to an independent lady of quality, and his enemies asserted that his father had been an Independent minister. He began his literary career with a romance, Pandion and Amphigenia, or the History of the coy Lady of Thessalia (1665). In 1671 he produced a romantic play, Juliana, or the Princess of Poland, which has, in spite of its title, no pretensions to rank as a historical drama.

The earl of Rochester procured for him, apparently with the sole object of annoying Dryden by infringing on his rights as poet-laureate, a commission to supply a masque for performance at court. Calisto gained him the favour of Charles II, but Rochester proved a fickle patron, and his favour was completely alienated by the success of Crowne's heroic play in two parts, The Destruction of Jerusalem by Titus Vespasian (1677). This piece contained a thinly disguised satire on the Puritan party in the description of the Pharisees, and about 1683 he produced a distinctly political play, City Politiques, satirizing the Whig party and containing characters which were readily recognized as portraits of Titus Oates and others. This made him many enemies, and he petitioned the king for a small place that would release him from the necessity of writing for the stage.

The king exacted one more comedy, which should, he suggested, he based on the No puede ser guardar una mujer of Moreto. This had already been unsuccessfully adapted, as Crowne discovered later, by Sir Thomas St Serfe, but in Crowne's hands it developed into Sir Courtly Nice (1685), a comedy which kept its place as a stock piece for nearly a century. Unfortunately Charles II died before the play was completed, and Crowne was disappointed of his reward. In 1698, Princess Anne attended a performance of his play Caligula during which Mary Lindsey sang a special composition by Richard Leveridge. Crowne continued to write plays, and it is stated that he was still living in 1703. According to an article in the Gentleman's Magazine John was still alive in the first decade of the 18th century when the writer recalls drinking with him. Letters to the royal household indicates he relied on the charity of Queen Mary II and Queen Anne who remembered performing one of his plays for Charles II when they were young princesses.

Crowne was a fertile writer of plays with an historical setting, in which heroic love was, in the fashion of the French romances, made the leading motive. The prosaic level of his style saved him as a rule from the rant to be found in so many contemporary heroic plays, but these pieces are of no particular interest. He was much more successful in comedy of the kind that depicts "humours".

Little is known of Crowne's later life although records show an Elias Crowne (birthplace listed as outside the county) marrying in Norfolk in the late 1680s, the son of a John and Sarah Crowne. There was also a John Crown born in 1667 in London.

Crowne died around 1712 and was buried at St Giles in the Fields, London.

== Works ==
- Charles VIII of France (1671) was dedicated to Rochester. In Timon, generally supposed to have been written by the earl, a line from this piece—"whilst sporting waves smil'd on the rising sun"—was held up to ridicule
- Juliana (1671), a tragedy
- The Country Wit (acted 1675, pr. 1693), a comedy derived in part from Molière's Le Sicilien, ou l'Amour peintre, is remembered for the leading character, Sir Mannerly Shallow
- The Ambitious Statesman, or The Loyal Favourite (1679), one of the most extravagant of his heroic efforts, deals with the history of Bernard d'Armagnac, Constable of France, after the battle of Agincourt
- Thyestes, A Tragedy (1681), spares none of the horrors of the Senecan tragedy, although an incongruous love story is interpolated
- The Misery of Civil War (1681), adapted from William Shakespeare's Henry VI, Part 2 and Henry VI, Part 3
- City Politiques (1683), a comedy
- Sir Courtly Nice (1685), a comedy
- Darius, King of Persia (1688), a tragedy
- Regulus (acted 1692, pr. 1694)
- The English Frier; or The Town Sparks (acted 1689, pr. 1690), perhaps suggested by Molière's Tartuffe, ridicules the court Catholics, and in Father Finical caricatures Father Edward Petre.
- The Married Beau (1694), is based on the Curioso Impertinente in Don Quixote.
- Caligula (1698)

He also produced a version of Racine's Andromaque, and an unsuccessful comedy, Justice Busy.
