= Samuel Sandford =

Samuel Sandford (fl. 1661–1699) was an English character actor, known for his roles as villains.

== Career ==
He joined William D'Avenant's company at Lincoln's Inn Fields about a year after its formation, and was, on 16 December 1661, the original Worm in Abraham Cowley's Cutter of Coleman Street. On 1 March 1662 he was Sampson in Romeo and Juliet, and on 20 October Maligni (the villain) in Thomas Porter's The Villain. Early in January 1663 he was Ernesto in Samuel Tuke's Adventures of Five Hours, and on 28 May Vindex in Robert Stapylton's Slighted Maid. During the same season he was Sylvanus in the Stepmother, also by Stapleton, and in 1664 was Wheadle in George Etherege's Comical Revenge, or Love in a Tub, and Provost in The Rivals, D'Avenant's alteration of The Two Noble Kinsmen.

After the break of performances on account of the Great Plague, Sandford on 26 March 1668, sang with Harris, as two ballad singers, the epilogue to D'Avenant's Man's the Master. After the death of D'Avenant, Sandford was, in 1669, Wary in Sir Solomon, or the Cautious Coxcomb, taken by John Caryll, in part, from Molière's L'École des Femmes. In 1671 he was Toxaris in Edward Howard's Women's Conquest, Justice Frump in Edward Revet's Town Shifts, or the Suburb Justice, and Cassonofsky in John Crowne's Juliana, or the Princess of Poland. After the migration of the company under Lady D'Avenant to the new house at Dorset Garden, Sandford was Trivultio in Crowne's Charles VIII, or the Invasion of Naples by the French, the first novelty produced at the house; Cureal in Edward Ravenscroft's Citizen turned Gentleman, or Mamamouchi, taken from Monsieur de Pourceaugnac and Le Bourgeois gentilhomme, and either Sir Timothy or Trick in the Earl of Orrery's Mr. Anthony. In 1672 he was Camillo in Joseph Arrowsmith's Reformation, Jasper in Henry Nevil Payne's Fatal Jealousy, and Ghost of Banquo in D'Avenant's operatic rendering of Macbeth.

In 1679 Sandford was Creon in Œdipus, by John Dryden and Nathaniel Lee. Playing with George Powell in this play, Sandford, who had been by mistake supplied with a real dagger instead of the trick dagger ordered, stabbed him, it is said, so seriously as to endanger his life. Nothing more is heard of Sandford until the amalgamation of the two London companies in 1682, when he played, at the Theatre Royal, one of the Sheriffs in Dryden and Lee's Duke of Guise. His name is not again traceable until 1688, when, at the same house, it appears as Cheatly in Shadwell's The Squire of Alsatia, and Colonel in William Mountfort's Injured Lovers. To 1691 belong Rugildas in Settle's Distressed Innocence, the Earl of Exeter in Mountfort's King Edward III, with the Fall of Mortimer, Count Verole in Thomas Southerne's Sir Anthony Love, Osmond in Dryden's King Arthur, and Sir Arthur Clare in the Merry Devil of Edmonton; to 1692 Sir Lawrence Limber in D'Urfey's Marriage Hater Matched, Hamilcar in Crowne's Regulus, Sosybius in Dryden's Cleomenes, the Abbot in Henry II, King of England, assigned to John Bancroft and also to Mountfort. In 1693 Sandford was Dr. Guiacum in D'Urfey's Richmond Heiress.

When, in 1695, Thomas Betterton and his associates seceded to the new theatre at Lincoln's Inn Fields, Sandford refused to join as a sharer, but at a salary of £3 acted with them, creating Foresight in William Congreve's Love for Love. In 1697 he was Caska in Charles Hopkins's Boadicea, Gonsalez in Congreve's Mourning Bride, and in 1698 Ulysses in George Granville's Heroic Love.

Sandford seems to have left the stage in 1699 or 1700. John Downes speaks of Betterton and Cave Underhill as "the only remains" of the Duke of York's servants from 1662 at the union in October 1706, it has been assumed that Sandford was then dead. Colley Cibber seems to imply that he was dead in 1704–5.

Anthony Aston, in his Brief Supplement, described Sandford as round-shouldered, meagre-faced, spindle-shanked, splay-footed, with a sour countenance, and long thin arms; and adds that Charles II called him the best villain in the world.
