= Duke's Company =

Theatre company

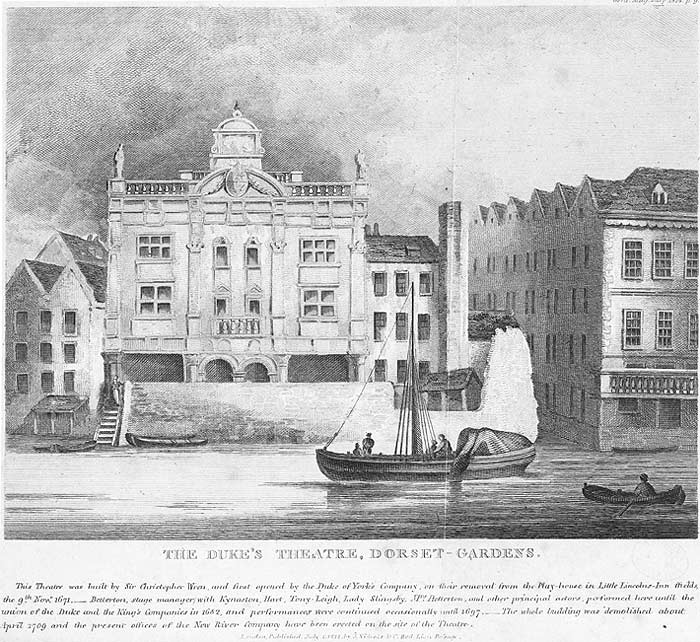
The Duke's Theatre at Dorset Gardens, on the riverfront, London's most luxurious playhouse.

The Duke's Company was a theatre company chartered by King Charles II at the start of the Restoration era, 1660. Sir William Davenant was manager of the company under the patronage of Prince James, Duke of York. During that period, theatres began to flourish again after they had been closed from the restrictions throughout the English Civil War and the Interregnum. The Duke's Company existed from 1660 to 1682, when it merged with the King's Company to form the United Company.

== History ==
The Duke's Company was one of the two theatre companies (the other being the King's Company) that were chartered by King Charles II at the start of the English Restoration era, when the London theatres re-opened after their eighteen-year closure (1642–60) during the English Civil War and the Interregnum.

The Duke's Company had the patronage of the King's younger brother Prince James, Duke of York and of Albany (later King James II & VII). It was managed by Sir William Davenant. The company started at the old Salisbury Court Theatre, and occasionally used the Cockpit in Drury Lane. After a year, the actors moved to a new theatre in Lincoln's Inn Fields, a building on Portugal Street that had previously been Lisle's Tennis Court (it opened on 18 June 1661). There they were joined by Thomas Betterton, who quickly became their star. In December 1660, the King granted the Duke's Company the exclusive rights to ten of Shakespeare's plays: Hamlet, Macbeth, King Lear, Romeo and Juliet, The Tempest, Twelfth Night, Much Ado About Nothing, Measure for Measure, Henry VIII, and Pericles, Prince of Tyre. (Note: In 1668, five more Shakespearean plays were added: Timon of Athens, Troilus and Cressida, and the Henry VI trilogy.) In 1661, their first year at Lincoln's Inn Fields, the company revived Hamlet, in a production that employed the innovation of stage scenery. Samuel Pepys saw their production on 24 August; he described it as "done with scenes very well, but above all, Betterton did the Prince's part beyond imagination".

Davenant tried to make the most of the limited Shakespearean materials available to him. In 1662 he staged The Law Against Lovers, a heavily adapted version of Measure for Measure that blended in characters from Much Ado About Nothing. It was the earliest of the many Shakespearean adaptations produced during the Restoration era and the eighteenth century.

The company also acted some of the plays in the canon of John Fletcher and his collaborators. Yet the rival King's Company under Thomas Killigrew controlled more of the "Old Stock Plays", the traditional repertory of English Renaissance drama (Davenant even had to petition for the right to perform his own pre-1642 plays). The Duke's Company was driven to seek out new work by a new generation of writers, and to experiment with new forms and styles. The company performed the plays of Davenant, John Dryden, Thomas Otway, George Etheredge, Thomas Shadwell and others; it produced Aphra Behn's plays from 1670 to 1682. The company also acted many translations and adaptations of French and other foreign plays; their 1662 production of Sir Samuel Tuke's The Adventures of Five Hours, a version of Calderón's comedy Los Empeños de Seis Horas, ran for thirteen straight performances and was the first great hit of Restoration drama.

Like the King's Company, the Duke's pioneered the use of the first English actresses in the early 1660s. Their standout performer was Mary Saunderson, later Mrs. Betterton, who acted many of the lead female roles in Shakespeare's plays. Anne Gibbs (later married to Thomas Shadwell), Hester Davenport and Mary Lee also had noteworthy careers.

Samuel Pepys saw many of their productions, and recorded them in his Diary. King Charles witnessed many of their productions too; in a break with past practice, the King sometimes came to the theatre to see the plays, which in previous reigns had never happened. (Instead, the acting companies had always gone to Court to perform.) In its busiest seasons, the company staged fifty different plays in a year, ten of them new works.

After Davenant's death in April 1668, Betterton took command of the company, in collaboration with Davenant's widow Lady Mary Davenant. Their management team expanded its strategies to ensure success: the company engaged in three consecutive (and profitable) summer seasons in Oxford starting in 1669. On 9 November 1671 the company moved into a new theatre in Dorset Garden, sometimes called the Queen's Theatre, "the most elegant of all the Restoration playhouses...". The Duke's Company exploited the scenic capacities of the Dorset Garden Theatre to produce many of the Restoration spectaculars and the early operas and semi-operas that characterized the Restoration era. The most successful of the company's semi-operas was the Dryden/ Davenant adaptation of The Tempest, which premiered on 7 November 1667. From 1675 on, Elizabeth Barry acted with the Duke's Company and became recognized as one of the stars of the era.

Both the Duke's and King's Companies suffered poor attendance during the turmoil of the Popish Plot period, 1678–81. When the King's Company fell into difficulties due to mismanagement, the Duke's Company joined with them to form the United Company in 1682, under the Duke's Company's management. The United Company began performances in November of that year. The King's Company theatre, the Theatre Royal in Drury Lane, was used mainly for plays, while the Duke's Dorset Garden theatre was devoted to operas and spectaculars.

John Downes was the prompter of the Duke's Company from 1662 to 1706. In 1708 he published his Roscius Anglicanus, the "main source of information about the Restoration theatre" for later generations.

== Company structure ==
=== Management ===
==== Sir William Davenant ====
Sir William Davenant was the first manager for the Duke's Company. Moreover, he was the patent holder and fundamentally the creator of the theatre group. After Killigrew had been granted his patent for the King's Company, Davenant drafted a document to give him and Killigrew duel monopoly over the theatre companies. Davenant could do this because he was rewarded with a warrant from Charles I during 1639 to build his own theatre, which whilst defunct still added gravitas to his claims. Furthermore, his masque work with Charles I, also being the writer for the two operas performed during the Puritan regime certainly cemented him as an accomplished and reliable manager to the second company. Thus the Duke's company was created.

Davenant, with a background in masque, grew to believe that spectacle was the way forward for British theatre. Mary Edmond comments that he "realised very early on that play goers would soon be demanding scenic theatres". Thus he went forward with creating theatre spaces that used changeable scenes, as well as always updating these scenes to make performances feel fresh and new for the audiences. During his time as manager he set the standard for the Duke's company. After being lumbered with only 23 plays in comparison to the King's 108, Davenant turned his company in the direction of new writing and adaptations of pre-restoration work that he did have. He worked with writers such as George Etheredge, John Dryden and Roger Boyle.

Not only did he attempt to keep the work performed for the Duke's men modern, he also had plans to keep the theatres as functional and of the highest quality. This new and exciting theatre manifested as Dorset Garden. Whilst this was not created until after his death, he managed to fund the project. He did this by selling 7 7/10ths of his shares to people at a price range of £600 – £800. Then sharers then managed to raise the rest of the substantial sum of £9000 which it is roughly considered to have cost.

==== Henry Harris and Thomas Betterton ====
The theatre house was built under the next set of managers for the Duke's company. This was the collaboration of Thomas Betterton and Henry Harris under the watch of Davenant's wife. Both Betterton and Harris were star players of Davenant. They continued the legacy of the Duke's company well. The theatre house that was erected during their time as managers was state of the art, boasting machinery, something that was no doubt inspired by European theatres. Furthermore, they continued to boast new writers including Aphra Behn, Thomas Otway and once again John Dryden. Unlike Davenant, neither wrote their own work. However, unlike the King's Company, the second managers wanted to make the transition as smooth as possible. Their decisions had "been reviewed by the board of sharing actors as well as by representatives of the Davenant family". Thus we see that despite having recognizable influence within the company, the duo didn't want to alienate or anyone involved in the company.

=== Ownership ===
As for who owned the company, it doesn't appear that there was one owner. Instead the companies were owned by shareholders who all had some say in the running of the company, and who helped with raising funds. Indeed, the main shareholder and patent holder should be considered the principal owner, which would therefore mean William Davenant would be the owner for the period of 1660–1668. Thereafter Lady Davenant would be considered the owner, with Betterton and Harris as the managers. William Van Lennep supports this assumption writing "The formal structure, then, of this type of arrangement consisted of a proprietor (the largest shareholder), who was the master of the company in both theatrical and financial affairs; a small number of sharing actors, who received a proportion of the profits after the gross receipts had provided for the major expenses; and a large number of actors on salary."

=== Joining the company ===
People joined the company by buying shares within the company, as "the companies were a business, and shares in them were sold to raise money needed to furnish theatres, hire personnel, and produce plays". Therefore, it is assumed that only those of a certain class could join the company.

=== Least influential member ===
In 1660, for the first time women were allowed to perform on the commercial stage. However, the significance of this at the time was evidently not as apparent. One can assume this because the records of this precise actress that performed is yet to be found; therefore suggesting that it was not recorded, undermining the influence of women performing in the theatre. An example of one of the women that was first to perform was Mrs. Eastland. Although her name appears on the prompter of Killigrew's original actresses, "her name appears on no dramatis personae until 1669 and she only ever played minor parts". In addition, she only appears on the cast list in 1669; nine years after the start of the company. In spite of the allowance of women in the theatre, it is evident that the patriarchal nature of the theatre was still very apparent. For men, the acting profession was a respected and successful career, however, "no woman with serious pretentions to respectability would countenance a stage career". But due to the nature and demands of being an actress; learning lines quickly, and needing to have a civilised etiquette meant that the company had to find women of a middle ground; this suggests the class differences, and the overall significance of men compared to women within the company.

== Plays ==
The new theatre the Duke's Playhouse opened on 28 June 1661 in Dorset Gardens, with the spectacular The Siege of Rhodes. The new theatre encompassed new possibilities for the company to create rich and dramatic theatre. "A small stage and proscenium arch; the scenery consisted of wings fronting pairs of large painted flats which could be moved along grooves set in the floor and flies of the stage". This was the first public playhouse in England to use such innovation and so impacted the choice of play. The plays became spectacles; the Siege of Rhodes being a "magnificent production". Other productions such as Hamlet (1661), Love and Honour (1661) and The Tempest (1667) characterise the company's restoration spectaculars and operas. Downes remarked that the adaptation of Love and Honour, originally from 1643, in 1661 was "Richly Cloth'd" with Betterton robed in fine garments and the set extraordinary.

=== Shakespeare ===
The Duke's Company were granted exclusive rights to ten Shakespearean plays; Hamlet, Macbeth, King Lear, Romeo and Juliet, The Tempest, Twelfth Night, Much Ado About Nothing, Measure for Measure, Henry VII and Pericles, Prince of Tyre. This, combined with the talented actors, such as Betterton, allowed the company to create adaptations of the Shakespeare's within the playhouse.

=== Davenant ===
William Davenant, as a manager and on good terms with the King, was able to use his patency and Betterton's talents to produce performances of his own plays. Killigrew and Davenant planned to put on tragedies, comedies, plays, operas, and all other similar entertainments, setting reasonable admission charges to meet "the great expences of scenes, musick and new decorations as have not bin formerly used".

=== Censorship ===
The King's theatre monopoly was controlled by the legislative power the Lord Chamberlain, who had the power to censor dramatic and printed work, having patents submit work 14 days before the performance. The Duke's Company found themselves subject to Chamberlain's legislation because of the comic performer and renowned improvisor, Edward Angel. During the run of Dryden and Davenant's The Tempest from 1667 to 1668, the Lord Chamberlain issued a warrant for the arrest of the comedian Edward Angel a member of the Dukes Company. Although the reasons behind the order remain unclear, one possible explanation is that Angel had caused offence with his talent for improvisation and unscripted political satire.

The licensing act even controlled the schedule and permitted attendees. For example, on 6 February 1720 he ordered Gay's new pastoral tragedy Dione be acted "immediately after Hughes"'s The Siege of Damascus.

== Actors ==
=== Thomas Betterton ===
Thomas Patrick Betterton (ca. 1635 – 28 April 1710), English actor in Dukes Theatre Company, son of an undercook for Charles I, born in London.

==== Early life and apprenticeship ====
As a young boy, Betterton's education is unclear, however he is described to have had a "great propensity" for reading, which may explain why he was bound to Sir William Davenant's publisher, John Holden, in an apprenticeship. He may have performed in Davenant's early-unlicensed plays, however unable to sustain acting as a full career due to the plays infrequency due to the uncertain status of theatre during the Interregnum (1649 – 1660). Documents link Betterton's name to working with John Rhodes, a bookseller, during this time. John Downes, a theatre prompter for Davenant's acting troupe, first documents Betterton's participation in theatre in 1659, Drury Lane. Downes accredited Betterton's talents saying; "His voice being audible strong, full and Articulate, as in the Prime of his Acting".

==== Acting career ====
On 6 October 1660, Betterton was a part of the Kings Company led by Thomas Killigrew. However, by 5 November, he had moved to a formal sharing agreement with Davenant to constitute the Dukes Company, as he may have felt his talent was overshadowed in the Kings Company. Betterton, in the Dukes Company became one of the most famous actors of the Restoration period. He was Samuel and Elizabeth Pepys's favourite actor; "He is called by us both, the best actor in the world." (Note: Pepys, 4 Nov 1661)

The Dukes theatre, with the help of Betterton's acting, were recognized for passing on a "traditional" and "correct" way to perform older plays, such as Shakespeare. The actors in the company owned some of the repeat roles as long as they remained in the company, which meant the actors could create and sustain their interpretations of the characters. Betterton is noted today as being "the first classical actor".

Charles Gildon quotes Betterton as saying the company were "obliged to make [their] Study [their] business", and even learning the parts before rehearsals to "enter thoroughly into the Nature of the Part". We can see here an early Stanislavskian approach to acting, where Betterton even "kept his mind in the same temperament as his character required". (Note: Cibber, 7.301)

Betterton undertook the responsibility of many lead roles in both Shakespeare, such as Hamlet, and in newer plays, such as Solyman the Magnificent. He is described as versatile actor, being able to play both villainous and comedic roles, however he did not play farce. In Milhous's "Census" there are 180 documented appearances of Betterton in the Dukes company however the real figure is most likely higher as 128 plays are left undocumented.

Betterton's most successful role in the Dukes Company was Hamlet, which he first played in the aftermath of Charles II's coronation in 1661. John Downes writes that Davenant had seen Joseph Taylor act the part before the interregnum and then taught Betterton "in every particle of it". The Dukes Companies reparatory system was commercially influenced to catch and shape the social mood of the time. As the Dukes Company had royal monopoly, he created a king in Hamlet to reflect the positive influence of the return of the monarchy; his Hamlet was valiant.

On 7 April 1668 Sir Davenant died, and Betterton and Augustus Harris, being elected by all parties involved in the theatre, took over as administrators until 1677 whilst the heir to the company, Charles Davenant was too inexperienced. They successfully took control and led the construction of the Dorset Garden Theatre in 1671.

Betterton throughout his career travelled to France regularly to learn about the Spectaculars and foreign Operas in order to increase the Dukes repertoire. However, Bettertons role in the spectaculars remained as chief consultant as he could neither sing nor dance, but he continued performing in traditional plays.

Betterton as a writer is never recorded to have created any original texts, however he took a key role in production adaptation and revamping old texts, which meant combining plot lines. He worked very closely with contemporary playwrights of the time such as Aphra Behn and John Dryden, and very much encouraged the development of their new works.

==== Private life ====
Much of Betterton's private life and character remains a mystery, as he did not leave behind any personal journals or records. His shadowy reputation is encouraged by Pepys description of him as "a very sober, serious man, and studious and humble". (Note: Pepys, 2 October 1662) Betterton married Mary Saunderson, an actress in the Dukes theatre, on 24 December 1662. Together, they accumulated shares within the Dukes Theatre Company by re-investing their money in part-shares. They never had children of their own, however had two adopted daughters who were both trained for the theatre. There is suggestion that Betterton may have fallen ill from 16 October 1667 to 6 July 1668, as Pepys notes in his diary; "Betterton, ill of fever- did not return for several months".

== See also ==
- George Jolly
- John Rhodes

== Notes and references ==
=== Sources ===
- Brayne, Charles (2004). "Angel, Edward (d. 1673)". Oxford Dictionary of National Biography (online ed.). Oxford University Press. doi:10.1093/ref:odnb/39756. (Subscription, Wikipedia Library access or UK public library membership required.)
- Brown, John Russell, ed. (2001). The Oxford Illustrated History of Theatre. Oxford: Oxford University Press. ISBN 9780192854421.
- Bush-Bailey, Gilli (2006). Treading the bawds: Actresses and playwrights on the Late Stuart stage. Women, Theatre and Performance. Manchester: Manchester University Press. ISBN 9780719072505.
- Edmond, Mary (1987). Rare Sir William Davenant: poet laureate, playwright, Civil War general, Restoration theatre manager. Manchester: Manchester University Press. ISBN 071902286X.
- Edmond, Mary (2004). "Davenant, Sir William (1606–1668)". Oxford Dictionary of National Biography (online ed.). Oxford University Press. doi:10.1093/ref:odnb/7197. (Subscription, Wikipedia Library access or UK public library membership required.)
- Fisk, Deborah Payne, ed. (2000). The Cambridge Companion to English Restoration Theatre. Cambridge Companions to Literature. Cambridge: Cambridge University Press. ISBN 9780521588126.
- Halliday, F.E. (1964). A Shakespeare Companion 1564–1964. Baltimore: Penguin. OCLC 222822680.
- Howe, Elizabeth (1992). The First English Actresses: Women and Drama, 1660–1700. Cambridge: Cambridge University Press. ISBN 9780521422109.
- Johanson, Kristine, ed. (2013). Shakespeare Adaptations from the Early Eighteenth Century: Five Plays. Fairleigh Dickinson University Press. ISBN 9781611474602.
- Milhous, Judith (2004). "Betterton, Thomas (bap. 1635, d. 1710)". Oxford Dictionary of National Biography (online ed.). Oxford University Press. doi:10.1093/ref:odnb/2311. (Subscription, Wikipedia Library access or UK public library membership required.)
- Roberts, David, ed. (2010). Thomas Betterton: The Greatest Actor of the Restoration Stage. Cambridge: Cambridge University Press. ISBN 9780521195843.
- Sprague, Arthur Colby (1926). Beaumont and Fletcher on the Restoration Stage. Cambridge, MA: Harvard University Press. ISBN 9780674366084.
- Van Lennep, William, ed. (1960). The London Stage 1660–1800: Part 1: 1660–1700. Vol. 1 (1st ed.). Carbondale: Southern Illinois University Press. hdl:2027/mdp.39015020696632. OCLC 1083463.
- Wilson, John Harold (1958). All the King's Ladies: Actresses of the Restoration. Chicago: University of Chicago Press. OCLC 492052383.
