= 1685 in literature =

This article contains information about the literary events and publications of 1685.

== Events ==
- January 22 – Antoine Furetière is expelled from the Académie française for proposing to publish a complete dictionary of the French language himself.
- February – The death of King Charles II of England brings a major theatrical flop in the Restoration era: Albion and Albanius – an allegorical drama in praise of the king with a text by John Dryden and music by Louis Grabu – is in rehearsal at the time.
- June – A revised version of Albion and Albanius fails largely because it coincides with the invasion of the Duke of Monmouth.
- June – Parliament revives the Licensing of the Press Act 1662, limiting London printers.
- unknown date – The Fourth Folio of Shakespeare's works is published in London.

== New books ==
=== Prose ===
- Scipion Abeille – Histoire des Os ("Description of the Bones")
- Aphra Behn – Love-Letters Between a Nobleman and His Sister
- Ihara Saikaku – Five Women Who Loved Love
- John Spencer – De Legibus Hebraeorum, Ritualibus et earum Rationibus libri tres
- Peder Syv - Grammatica

=== Drama ===
- Jean Galbert de Campistron – Andronic
- John Crowne – Sir Courtly Nice
- Thomas d'Urfey
  - The Banditti, or A Lady's Distress
  - A Commonwealth of Women (adapted from The Sea Voyage)
- Nahum Tate
  - The Cuckold's Haven (adaptation of Eastward Ho)
  - A Duke and No Duke (adaptation of Sir Aston Cockayne's Trappolin Suppos'd a Prince)

== Births ==
- January 9 – Tiberius Hemsterhuis, Dutch critic (died 1766)
- March 12 – George Berkeley Irish philosopher and bishop (died 1753)
- June 30 – John Gay, English poet and dramatist (died 1732)

== Deaths ==
- March 18 – Francis Harold, Irish Franciscan historian (year of birth not known)
- c. April 14 – Thomas Otway, English dramatist (born 1652)
- April 29 – Luc d'Achery, French author of critical editions of medieval manuscripts (born 1609)
- June 16 – Anne Killigrew, English poet and painter (born 1660)
- June 17 – Andrew Allam, English historian (born 1655)
- July 1 – Nalan Xingde, Chinese ci poet (born 1655)
- September 25 – Jean Cabassut, French theologian (born 1604)
- October 23 – Yamaga Sokō (山鹿 素行), Japanese philosopher (born 1622)
- unknown date – Placido Puccinelli, Italian historian (born 1609)
