= Joseph Williams (actor) =

16th-17th-century English actor

Joseph Williams was an English stage actor of the seventeenth and early eighteenth century.

Williams initially joined the Duke's Company and was apprenticed to the senior actor Henry Harris In 1682 he moved to the merged United Company, appearing at Drury Lane and the Dorset Gardens Theatre. In 1695 when the company split, Williams initially planned to join Thomas Betterton and the breakaways at the Lincoln's Inn Fields Theatre, but ended up remaining at Drury Lane. One of his contemporaries at the United Company was an actor named David Williams, and occasionally it is hard to distinguish their roles listed on playbills.

== Selected roles ==
- Moses in The Town Shifts by Edward Revet (1671)
- Hadland in The Counterfeit Bridegroom by Aphra Behn (1677)
- Pylades in Circe by Charles Davenant (1677)
- Troilus in The Destruction of Troy by John Banks (1678)
- Cispin in The Counterfeits by John Leanerd (1678)
- Aeneas in Troilus and Cressida by John Dryden (1679)
- Abardanes in The Loyal General by Nahum Tate (1679)
- Sylla in Caius Marius by Thomas Otway (1679)
- Palante in Caesar Borgia by Nathaniel Lee (1679)
- Antonio in The Loving Enemies by Lewis Maidwell (1680)
- Friendly in The Revenge by Aphra Behn (1680)
- Prince of Cleve in The Princess of Cleve by Nathaniel Lee (1680)
- Polydore in The Orphan by Thomas Otway (1680)
- Theodosius in Theodosius by Nathaniel Lee (1680)
- Henry VI in The Misery of Civil War by John Crowne (1680)
- Tiberius in Lucius Junius Brutus by Nathaniel Lee (1680)
- Townly in The London Cuckolds by Edward Ravenscroft (1681)
- Rochford in Virtue Betrayed by John Banks (1682)
- Sir Charles Merriwell in The City Heiress by Aphra Behn (1682)
- Heartall in The Royalist by Thomas D'Urfey (1682)
- Fairlove in Mr. Turbulent by Anonymous (1682)
- Alberto in A Duke and No Duke by Nahum Tate (1684)
- Captain Marine in A Commonwealth of Women by Thomas D'Urfey (1685)
- Sir Petronell Flash in Cuckold's Haven by Nahum Tate (1685)
- Don Fernand in The Banditti by Thomas D'Urfey (1686)
- King of Sicily in The Injured Lovers by William Mountfort (1688)
- Duke of Guise in The Massacre of Paris by Nathaniel Lee (1689)
- Bacon in The Widow Ranter by Aphra Behn (1689)
- Don Sebastian in Don Sebastian by John Dryden (1690)
- Ithocles in The Treacherous Brothers by George Powell (1690)
- Don Carlos in The Successful Strangers by William Mountfort (1690)
- Young Ranter in The English Friar by John Crowne (1690)
- Luscindo in The Amorous Bigot by Thomas Shadwell (1690)
- Ilford in Sir Anthony Love by Thomas Southerne (1690)
- Amphitryon in Amphitryon by John Dryden (1690)
- Earl of March in Edward III by John Bancroft (1690)
- Wildfire in The Scowerers by Thomas Shadwell (1690)
- Oswald in King Arthur by John Dryden (1691)
- Wilding in The Wives' Excuse by Thomas Southerne (1691)
- Xantippus in Regulus by John Crowne (1692)
- Vainlove in The Old Bachelor by William Congreve (1693)
- Frederick in The Richmond Heiress by Thomas D'Urfey (1693)
- Mellefont in The Double Dealer by William Congreve (1693)
- Garcia in Love Triumphant by John Dryden (1694)
- Biron in The Fatal Marriage by Thomas Southerne (1694)
- Alonzo in The Rival Sisters by Robert Gould (1695)
- Lieutenant Governor in Oroonoko by Thomas Southerne (1695)
- Elder Worthy in Love's Last Shift by Colley Cibber (1696)
- Freeman in The Cornish Comedy by George Powell (1696)
- Valerio in The Unhappy Kindness by Thomas Scott (1696)
- Polycastro in The Triumphs Of Virtue by Anonymous (1697)
- Palmerin Worthy in The World in the Moon by Elkanah Settle (1697)
- Valerius Asiaticus in Caligula by John Crowne (1698)
- Epaphus in Phaeton by Charles Gildon (1698)
- Roebuck in Love and a Bottle by George Farquhar (1698)
- Pilades in Iphigenia by John Dennis (1699)
- Constant in Love at a Loss by Catherine Trotter (1700)
- Archduke of Austria in The Unhappy Penitent by Catherine Trotter (1701)
- Gainlove in Vice Reclaimed by Richard Wilkinson (1703)
- Hannibal in Perolla And Izadora by Colley Cibber (1705)
- Worthy in The Recruiting Officer by George Farquhar (1706)

== Bibliography ==
- Highfill, Philip H, Burnim, Kalman A. & Langhans, Edward A. A Biographical Dictionary of Actors, Actresses, Musicians, Dancers, Managers, and Other Stage Personnel in London, 1660–1800: West to Zwingmanl. SIU Press, 1973.
- Straub, Kristina, G. Anderson, Misty and O'Quinn, Daniel . The Routledge Anthology of Restoration and Eighteenth-Century Drama. Taylor & Francis, 2017.
