= Thomas Gillow =

English actor

Thomas Gillow (died 1687) was an English stage actor of the Restoration era. His name was sometimes written Gilloe or Gillo.

His first known role was at the Lincoln's Inn Fields Theatre in Samuel Pordage's Herod and Mariamne in 1671. He remained with the Duke's Company at the Dorset Gardens Theatre until the merger that created the United Company in 1682. His first role at Drury Lane was in John Dryden's The Duke of Guise in November that year. He remained a prominent member of the company, appearing in a mixture of comedies and tragedies. He died in May 1687 and was buried at St Bride's Church in the City of London. An actress billed as Mrs Gillow appeared at the Dorset Street Theatre between 1675 and 1678 and this may have been his wife Mary Gillow.

== Selected roles ==
- Sosius in Herod and Mariamne by Samuel Pordage (1671)
- Lamot in Love and Revenge by Elkanah Settle (1674)
- Polyndus in Alcibiades by Thomas Otway (1675)
- Theinmingus in The Conquest of China by Elkanah Settle (1675)
- Rutilius in Titus and Berenice by Thomas Otway (1676)
- Lynco in Pastor Fido by Elkanah Settle (1676)
- Stanly in Tom Essence by Thomas Rawlins (1676)
- Muphti in Ibrahim by Elkanah Settle (1676)
- Dorido in The French Conjuror by Thomas Porter (1677)
- Sanders in The Counterfeit Bridegroom by Aphra Behn (1677)
- Diomedes in The Destruction of Troy by John Banks (1678)
- Phoras in Oedipus by John Dryden (1678)
- Don Luis in The Counterfeits by John Leanerd (1678)
- Diphilus in The Loyal General by Nahum Tate (1679)
- Agamemnon in Troilus and Cressida by John Dryden (1679)
- Metellus in Caius Marius by Thomas Otway (1679)
- Paul Orsino in Caesar Borgia by Nathaniel Lee (1679)
- Valerius in Lucius Junius Brutus by Nathaniel Lee (1680)
- Raymond in The Spanish Fryar by John Dryden (1680)
- Richard in The Misery of Civil War by John Crowne (1680)
- Acasto in The Orphan by Thomas Otway (1680)
- Vidam of Chartres in The Princess of Cleve by Nathaniel Lee (1680)
- Cardinal in Virtue Betrayed by John Banks (1682)
- Bedamar in Venice Preserv'd by Thomas Otway (1682)
- Hangby in Mr. Turbulent by Anonymous (1682)
- Melanax in The Duke of Guise by John Dryden (1682)
- Arius in Constantine the Great by Nathaniel Lee (1683)
- Barberino in A Duke and No Duke by Nahum Tate (1684)
- Captain Seagull in Cuckold's Haven by Nahum Tate (1685)
- Don Sebastian in A Commonwealth of Women by Thomas D'Urfey (1685)
- Testimony in Sir Courtly Nice by John Crowne (1685)
- Don Garcia in The Banditti by Thomas D'Urfey (1686)

== Bibliography ==
- Highfill, Philip H, Burnim, Kalman A. & Langhans, Edward A. A Biographical Dictionary of Actors, Actresses, Musicians, Dancers, Managers, and Other Stage Personnel in London, 1660-1800: Garrick to Gyngell. SIU Press, 1978.
