= Emily Price =

English actress

Emily Price was an English stage actress of the seventeenth century. She was a member of the Duke's Company between 1676 and 1682, acting at the Dorset Garden Theatre in London and then joined the merged United Company. She was a friend of the playwright Aphra Behn and appeared in several of her plays. She was billed as Mrs Price.

== Selected roles ==
- Christina in Squire Oldsapp by Thomas D'Urfey (1678)
- Helena in The Destruction of Troy by John Banks (1678)
- Lucretia in Sir Patient Fancy by Aphra Behn (1678)
- Violante in The Counterfeits by John Leanerd (1678)
- Camilla in Friendship in Fashion by Thomas Otway (1678)
- Edraste in The Loyal General by Nahum Tate (1679)
- Adorna in Caesar Borgia by Nathaniel Lee (1679)
- Sylvia in The Soldier's Fortune by Thomas Otway (1680)
- Diana in The Revenge by Aphra Behn (1680)
- Priscilla in Mr Turbulent by Anonymous (1680)
- Security's Wife in Cuckold's Haven by Nahum Tate (1685)
- Hippolita in A Commonwealth of Women by Thomas D'Urfey (1685)
- Jane in The Devil of a Wife by Thomas Jevon (1686)

== Bibliography ==
- Lanier, Henry Wysham. The First English Actresses: From the Initial Appearance of Women on the Stage in 1660 Till 1700. The Players, 1930.
- Van Lennep, W. The London Stage, 1660–1800: Volume One, 1660–1700. Southern Illinois University Press, 1960.
- Woodcock, George. Aphra Behn: The English Sappho. Black Rose Books, 1989.
