= The Loyal General =

1679 play

- Original language: English
- Written by: Nahum Tate
- Genre: Tragedy

Premiere
- Date: December 1679
- Place: Dorset Garden Theatre, London

The Loyal General is a 1679 tragedy by the Irish writer Nahum Tate. It was first performed at the Dorset Garden Theatre by the Duke's Company. The prologue was written by John Dryden.

The original cast included Thomas Betterton as Theocrin, Henry Harris as King, Henry Norris as Theron, Thomas Gillow as Diphilus, Thomas Jevon as Escalus, John Bowman as Pisander, Joseph Williams as Abardanes, Elizabeth Currer as Queen, Mary Lee as Arviola and Emily Price as Edraste.

== Bibliography ==
- Van Lennep, W. The London Stage, 1660-1800: Volume One, 1660-1700. Southern Illinois University Press, 1960.
