= Mary Slingsby =

English stage actress

Mary, Lady Slingsby, born Aldridge (perhaps died 1693), was an English actress. After a marriage lasting 1670 to 1680 to John Lee, an actor, during which she was on the stage as Mrs. Lee, she was widowed. She then married Sir Charles Slingsby, 2nd Baronet, a nephew of Sir Robert Slingsby, and performed as Lady Slingsby. Theatre historians have pointed out the difficulty in identifying her roles in the period when Elinor Leigh, wife of Anthony Leigh, was performing as Mrs. Leigh, because the homophones "Lee" and "Leigh" were not consistently spelled at the time.

== Stage career ==
In 1671 Mrs Lee appeared at Lincoln's Inn Fields in the character of Daranthe in Edward Howard's tragi-comedy Woman's Conquest, and as Leticia in Town-Shifts, or the Suburb-Justice, attributed to Edward Revet, and licensed on 2 May 1672. Next, at Dorset Garden, where Mrs Lee remained for ten years, she played opposite Æmilia in Joseph Arrowsmith's Reformation (1672).

In Henry VI, Part I, with the Murder of Humphrey, Duke of Gloucester, adapted by John Crowne from Shakespeare, and acted in 1681, the part of Queen Margaret was assigned to Lady Slingsby. In Henry VI, Part II, or the Misery of Civil War, from the same source, the same character went to Mrs Lee. As the second part was written first, and probably produced first, Mrs Lee's second marriage may have been in 1681. In Nahum Tate's adaptation of King Lear Lady Slingsby was Regan, in Nat Lee's Lucius Junius Brutus, the Father of his Country, Sempronia, and Marguerite in Lee's The Princess of Cleve.

After the merger of the two major acting companies in 1682, Slingsby played, at the Theatre Royal, the Queen Mother in John Dryden and Nat Lee's Duke of Guise. In Thomas D'Urfey's Commonwealth of Woman, an adaptation of John Fletcher's The Sea Voyage, produced in 1685, she was Clarinda. Her name then disappeared from the bills.

Her name appears on the Burdett-Coutts Memorial Sundial in Old St. Pancras Churchyard, listing the names of important graves lost therein by the building of a railway line. Her date of death is given as 1693. She was probably buried on 1 March 1693, although there is some doubt as to whether the Mary Slingsby buried is this lady. It has been speculated that the name may have been withheld to prevent her husband's creditors from finding him via his wife.

== In fiction ==
Mrs Lee appears as a character in the 2015 play [exit Mrs Behn] or, The Leo Play by Christopher van der Ark.

== Selected roles ==
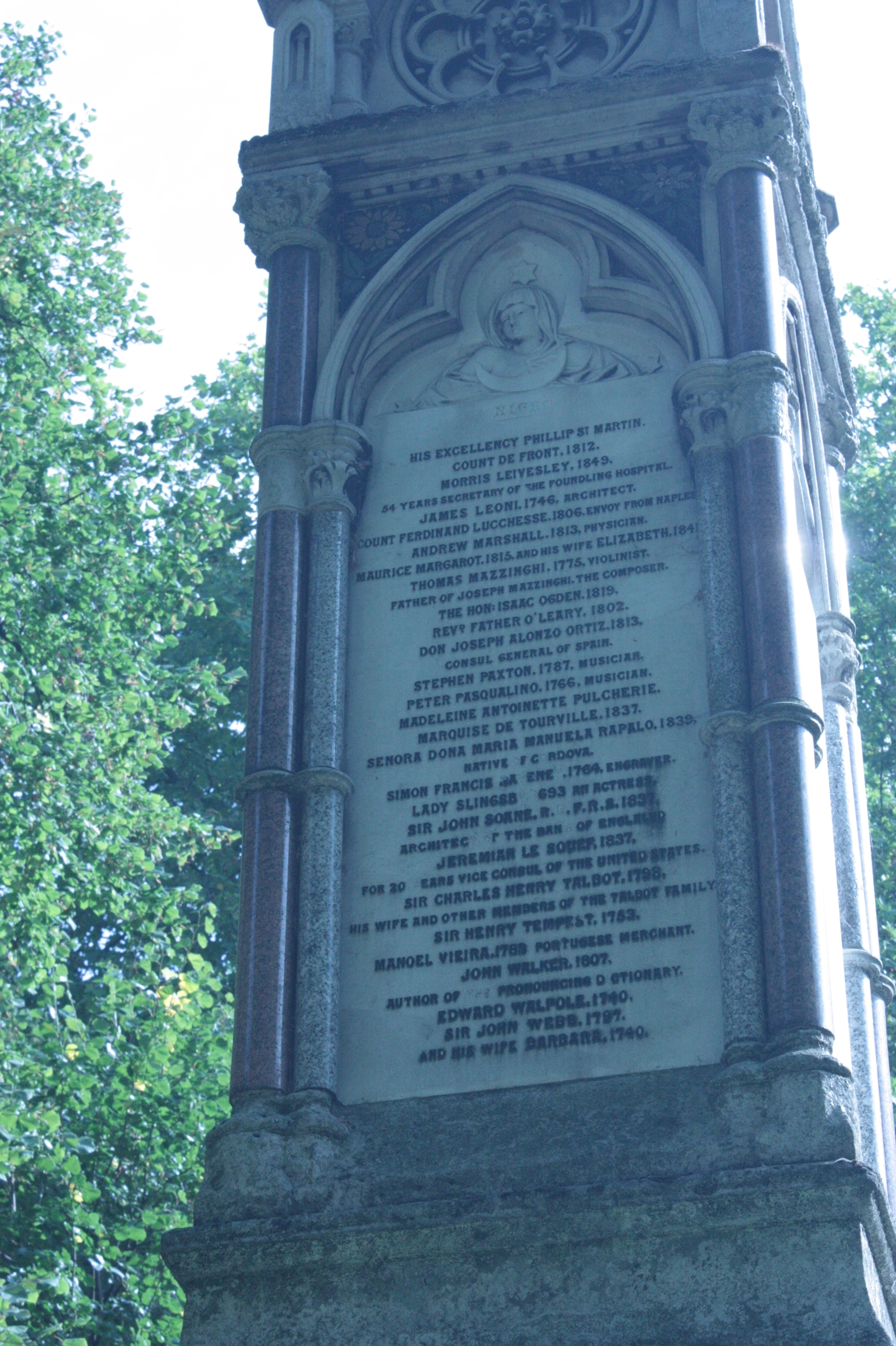
Slingsby's name is on the Burdett Coutts Memorial Sundial

- Olinda in The Forc'd Marriage by Aphra Behn (1670)
- Doranthe in The Women's Conquest by Edward Howard (1670)
- Euginia in The Six Days' Adventure by Edward Howard (1671)
- Leticia in The Town Shifts by Edward Revet (1671)
- Salome in Herod and Mariamne by Samuel Pordage (1671)
- Aemilia in The Reformation by Joseph Arrowsmith (1673)
- Mariamne in The Empress of Morocco by Elkanah Settle (1673)
- Nigrello in Love and Revenge by Elkanah Settle (1674)
- Amavanga in The Conquest of China by Elkanah Settle (1675)
- Deidamia in Alcibiades by Thomas Otway (1675)
- Christina in The Country Wit by John Crowne (1676)
- Roxalana in Ibrahim by Elkanah Settle (1676)
- Mrs Loveit in The Man of Mode by George Etheredge (1676)
- Queen of Spain in Don Carlos, Prince of Spain by Thomas Otway (1676)
- Isabella in Abdelazer by Aphra Behn (1676)
- Madam Fickle in Madam Fickle by Thoms Durfey (1676)
- Berenice in Titus and Berenice by Thomas Otway (1676)
- Corsica in Pastor Fido by Elkanah Settle (1676)
- Circe in Circe by Charles Davenant (1677)
- Roxana in The Siege of Babylon by Samuel Pordage (1677)
- Elvira in The Counterfeits by John Leanerd (1678)
- Eurydice in Oedipus by John Dryden (1678)
- Cassandra in The Destruction of Troy by John Banks (1678)
- Laura Lucretia in The Feign'd Curtizans by Aphra Behn (1679)
- Bellamira in Caesar Borgia by Nathaniel Lee (1679)
- Cressida in Troilus and Cressida by John Dryden (1679)
- Arviola The Loyal General by Nahum Tate (1679)
- Julia in The Loving Enemies by Lewis Maidwell (1680)
- Queen Margaret in The Misery of Civil War by John Crowne (1680)
- Marguerite in The Princess of Cleve by Nathaniel Lee (1680)
- Sempronia Lucius Junius Brutus by Nathaniel Lee (1680)
- Lucia in Mr. Turbulent by Anonymous (1682)
- Queen Mother in The Duke of Guise by John Dryden (1682)
- Lady Noble in Dame Dobson by Edward Ravenscroft (1683)
- Clarinda in A Commonwealth of Women by Thoms Durfey (1685)

== Notes ==
Attribution

This article incorporates text from a publication now in the public domain: Lee, Sidney, ed. (1897). "Slingsby, Mary". Dictionary of National Biography. Vol. 52. London: Smith, Elder & Co.
