= Lucius Junius Brutus (play) =

1680 play by Nathaniel Lee

- Written by: Nathaniel Lee
- Original language: English
- Genre: Tragedy

Premiere
- Date premiered: 8 December 1680
- Place premiered: Dorset Garden Theatre, London

Lucius Junius Brutus; Father of his Country is a Restoration tragedy play by Nathaniel Lee from 1680. It depicts the life of Roman statesman Lucius Junius Brutus. It was first staged at the Dorset Garden Theatre by the Duke's Company.

The original cast included Thomas Betterton as Lucius Junius Brutus, William Smith as Titus, Joseph Williams as Tiberius, John Wiltshire as Collatinus, Thomas Gillow as Valerius, Henry Norris as Horatius, William Fieldhouse and Thomas Percival as Fecilian Priests, James Nokes as Vindicius, Thomas Jevon as Fabritius, Mary Slingsby as Sempronia, Mary Betterton as Lucretia and Elizabeth Barry as Teraminta. It was published the following year by Jacob Tonson, and dedicated to the Earl of Dorset.

== Reception ==
The play became controversial at court and was suppressed after its third performance due to some lines from the character of Lucius Tarquinius Superbus (last king of Rome) that were taken to be a reflection on King Charles II.

== Legacy ==
It served as an inspiration for the play The Tragedy of Brutus; or, The Fall of Tarquin by John Howard Payne.
