= Thomas Percival (actor) =

English actor

Thomas Percival or Percivall was an English stage actor of the seventeenth century. He was a member of the Duke's Company from 1671 to 1682 and then the merged United Company until 1686. Throughout his career he was confined to playing supporting roles, never graduating to major parts. He was the father of the actress Susanna Verbruggen. In 1693, following his retirement from the stage, he was arrested for coin clipping, a capital crime, for which he was sentenced to hang at Tyburn. The intercession of his daughter with Mary II saw his sentence commuted to transportation, but before he reached Portsmouth he died of natural causes.

== Selected roles ==
- Burbon in Love and Revenge by Elkanah Settle (1674)
- Osmin in Abdelazer by Aphra Behn (1676)
- Old Monylove in Tom Essence by Thomas Rawlins (1676)
- Sir Nicholas Gimcrack in The Virtuoso by Thomas Shadwell (1676)
- Ordgano in The Wrangling Lovers by Edward Ravenscroft (1676)
- Carino in Pastor Fido by Elkanah Settle (1676)
- Leander in The Cheats of Scapin by Thomas Otway (1676)
- Sir Gregory Lovemuch in The Counterfeit Bridegroom by Aphra Behn (1677)
- Apothecary in A Fond Husband by Thomas D'Urfey (1677)
- Truro in The French Conjuror by Thomas Porter (1677)
- Philippo in The Rover by Aphra Behn (1677)
- Dormilon in The Counterfeits by John Leanerd (1678)
- Vitellozzo in Caesar Borgia by Nathaniel Lee (1679)
- Granius in Caius Marius by Thomas Otway (1679)
- Priam in Troilus and Cressida by John Dryden (1679)
- Chaplain in The Orphan by Thomas Otway (1680)
- Old Lord Clifford in The Misery of Civil War by John Crowne (1680)
- Fecilian Priests in Lucius Junius Brutus by Nathaniel Lee (1680)
- Spinosa in Venice Preserved by Thomas Otway (1682)
- Captain Jonas in The Royalist by Thomas D'Urfey (1682)
- Doctor Quibus in Mr. Turbulent by Anonymous (1682)
- Malicorne in The Duke of Guise by John Dryden (1683)
- Boldsprite in A Commonwealth of Women by Thomas D'Urfey (1684)
- Mago in A Duke and No Duke by Nahum Tate (1684)
- Mr Nokes in Cuckold's Haven by Nahum Tate (1685)
- Cook in The Devil of a Wife by Thomas Jevon (1686)
- Lopez in The Banditti by Thomas D'Urfey (1686)

== Bibliography ==
- Bush-Bailey, Gilli . Treading the bawds: Actresses and playwrights on the Late Stuart stage. Manchester University Press, 2013.
- Johnson, Odai. Rehearsing the Revolution: Radical Performance, Radical Politics in the English Restoration. University of Delaware Press, 2000.
- Todd, Janet. The Works of Aphra Behn: v. 6: Complete Plays. Routledge, 2018.
- Van Lennep, W. The London Stage, 1660–1800: Volume One, 1660–1700. Southern Illinois University Press, 1960.
