= The French Conjuror =

1677 play

- Original language: English
- Written by: Thomas Porter
- Genre: Restoration Comedy

Premiere
- Date: June 1677
- Place: Dorset Garden Theatre, London

The French Conjuror is a comedy play by the English writer Thomas Porter. It was first staged by the Duke's Company at the Dorset Garden Theatre in London in June 1677.

The original cast included Thomas Jevon as Avarito, John Crosby as Claudio, Thomas Gillow as Dorido, Henry Norris as Horatio, Thomas Percival as Truro, Anthony Leigh as Monsieur, John Richards as Audacio, Elizabeth Barry as Clorinia, Margaret Hughes as Leonora and Elinor Leigh as Scintilla.

== Bibliography ==
- Van Lennep, W. The London Stage, 1660-1800: Volume One, 1660-1700. Southern Illinois University Press, 1960.
