= Troilus and Cressida (Dryden play) =

1679 Shakespearean adaptation by Dryden

- Original language: English
- Written by: John Dryden
- Genre: Tragedy

Premiere
- Date: April 1679
- Place: Dorset Garden Theatre, London

Troilus And Cressida; Or, Truth Found Too Late is a 1679 tragedy by the English writer John Dryden. It was first staged by the Duke's Company at the Dorset Garden Theatre in London. It was a reworking of William Shakespeare's 1602 play Troilus and Cressida, set during the Trojan Wars. In acknowledgement of this Dryden has the prologue spoken by Shakespeare's ghost, defending the alterations made to the play.

The original cast included Thomas Betterton as Troilus, William Smith as Hector, Thomas Percival as Priam, Joseph Williams as Aeneas, Anthony Leigh as Pandarus, Thomas Gillow as Agamemnon, Henry Harris as Ulysses, George Bright as Ajax, Henry Norris as Nestor, John Crosby as Diomedes, John Bowman as Patroclus, John Richards as Anthenor, Cave Underhill as Thersites, Mary Lee as Cressida and Mary Betterton as Andromache. The published version of the play was dedicated to the politician Lord Sunderland.

== Bibliography ==
- Frank, Marcie. Gender, Theatre, and the Origins of Criticism: From Dryden to Manley. Cambridge University Press, 2002.
- Van Lennep, W. The London Stage, 1660-1800: Volume One, 1660-1700. Southern Illinois University Press, 1960.
