= The Counterfeit Bridegroom =

1677 play

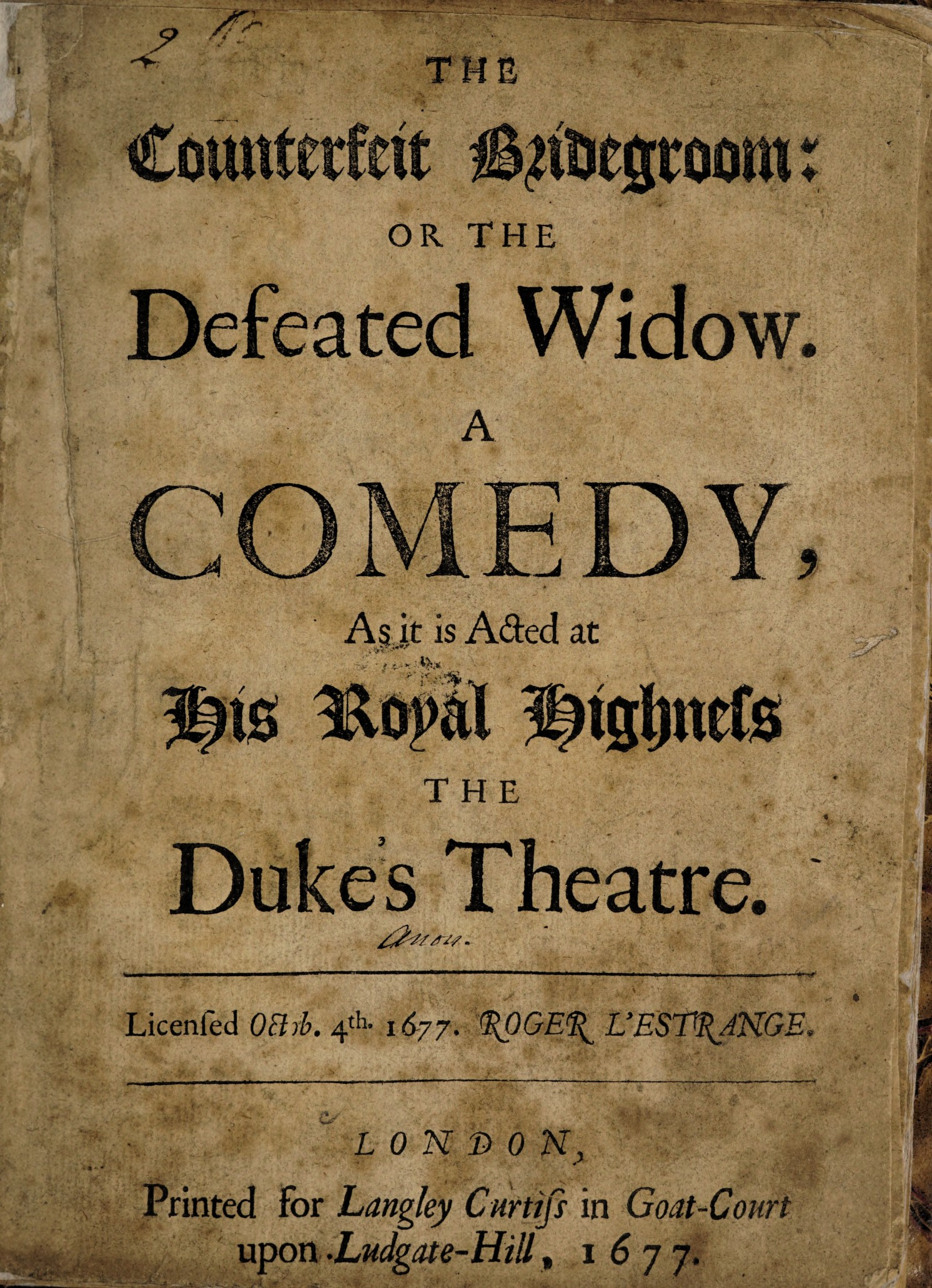
- Original language: English
- Written by: attributed to Aphra Behn or Thomas Betterton, adapted from a play by Thomas Middleton
- Genre: Restoration Comedy

Premiere
- Date: 1676 or 1677
- Place: Dorset Garden Theatre, London

The Counterfeit Bridegroom; Or, The Defeated Widow is a 1677 comedy play, adapted from an earlier Jacobean play, No Wit, No Help Like a Woman's by Thomas Middleton. The play was published anonymously in the fall of 1677. The adaptation has often been attributed to Aphra Behn, but her involvement is not certain, and alternative attributions to Thomas Betterton or to a collaboration of more than one reviser have also been suggested.

The play was originally performed in 1676 or 1677 by the Duke's Company at the Dorset Garden Theatre in London. The cast included Anthony Leigh as Sir Oliver Santloe, John Bowman as Peter Santloe, Thomas Gillow as Sanders, John Crosby as Noble, Joseph Williams as Hadland, Thomas Percival as Sir Gregory Lovemuch, Henry Norris as Gazer, John Richards as Sam, Anne Shadwell as Clarina, Margaret Osborne as Widow Laudwell and Elizabeth Currer as Mrs Hadland.

== Bibliography ==
- Challinor, Jennie. "'Pox on Kindred': The Anonymous Counterfeit Bridegroom (1677) and Its Middletonian Source", Restoration: Studies in English Literary Culture, 1660–1700 46, 2022, pp. 37–64
- Nicoll, Allardyce. History of English Drama, 1660-1900: Volume 1, Restoration Drama, 1660-1700. Cambridge University Press, 1952.
- Roberts, David. Thomas Betterton: The Greatest Actor of the Restoration Stage. Cambridge University Press, 2010.
- Van Lennep, W. The London Stage, 1660-1800: Volume One, 1660-1700. Southern Illinois University Press, 1960.
