= 1682 in literature =

This article contains information about the literary events and publications of 1682.

== Events ==
- In London, the King's Company and the Duke's Company join to form the United Company of actors.
- In Paris, the Bibliothèque Mazarine reopens at the Collège des Quatre-Nations.
- In Japan, Ihara Saikaku's The Life of an Amorous Man (好色一代男, Kōshoku Ichidai Otoko, "The Man Who Spent His Life in Love") inaugurates what becomes known as ukiyo-zōshi ("books of the floating world"), the first major genre of popular Japanese fiction.

== New books ==
=== Prose ===
- John Bunyan – The Holy War
- Francisco Nunez de Cepeda – Idea del buen pastor representada en Empresas sacras
- William Penn
  - Frame of Government of Pennsylvania
  - Some Fruits of Solitude In Reflections And Maxims
- Mary Rowlandson – A Narrative of the Captivity and Restoration of Mrs. Mary Rowlandson
- Ihara Saikaku (井原 西鶴) – The Life of an Amorous Man (好色一代男 Kōshoku Ichidai Otoko)
- Bulstrode Whitelocke – Memorials of the English Affairs from the Beginning of the Reign of Charles I (Puritan viewpoint)

=== Children and young people ===
- Dorcas Dole – Salutation and Seasonable Exhortation to Children (by a Quaker)

=== Drama ===
- Anonymous – Mr. Turbulent
- John Banks – The Unhappy Favourite, or the Earl of Essex
- John Banks – Vertue Betray'd
- John Dryden – MacFlecknoe
- John Dryden and Nathaniel Lee – The Duke of Guise
- Thomas d'Urfey
  - The Injured Princess (adapted from Cymbeline)
  - The Royalist
- Thomas Otway – Venice Preserv'd
- William Shakespeare adapted by Nahum Tate – Coriolanus
- Thomas Southerne – The Persian Prince, or the Loyal Brother
- Elkanah Settle- The Heir of Morocco
- Pedro Calderon de la Barca – Verdadera V parte de comedias

=== Poetry ===
- Nahum Tate (probable) – Absalom and Achitophel, part 2

== Births ==
- October 2 – Birgitte Christine Kaas, Norwegian poet and translator (died 1761)
- October 29 – Pierre François Xavier de Charlevoix, French historian (died 1761)
- Unknown date – Jacopo Facciolati, Paduan lexicographer and philologist (died 1769)

== Deaths ==
- March 12 – Francis Sempill, Scottish poet and wit (born c. 1616)
- October 19 – Sir Thomas Browne, English polymath and poet (born 1605)
- November 14 – Rijcklof van Goens, Governor-General of the Dutch East Indies 1678-1681 and travel writer (born 1619)
- Unknown dates
  - Philip Hunton, English clergyman and political writer (born c. 1600)
  - Francisco Núñez de Pineda y Bascuñán, Chilean writer and soldier (born 1607 in literature)
