= Cuckold's Haven =

1685 play

- Original language: English
- Written by: Nahum Tate
- Genre: Restoration Comedy

Premiere
- Date: July 1685
- Place: Dorset Garden Theatre, London

Cuckold's Haven; Or, An Alderman No Conjurer is a 1685 comedy play by the Irish writer Nahum Tate. It was first staged at the Dorset Garden Theatre in London by the United Company. It was a reworking of George Chapman, Ben Jonson and John Marston's Eastward Ho.

The original cast included Thomas Percival as Mr Nokes, Thomas Jevon as Quicksilver, Anthony Leigh as Security, Joseph Williams as Sir Petronell Flash, Thomas Gillow as Captain Seagull, Joseph Haines as Bramble, Susanna Percival as Girtred, Katherine Corey as Mrs Touchstone and Emily Price as Security's Wife.

== Bibliography ==
- Canfield, J. Douglas. Tricksters and Estates: On the Ideology of Restoration Comedy. University Press of Kentucky, 2014.
- Orr, Bridget. Empire on the English Stage 1660-1714. Cambridge University Press, 2001.
- Van Lennep, W. The London Stage, 1660-1800: Volume One, 1660-1700. Southern Illinois University Press, 1960.
