= A Commonwealth of Women =

1685 play

- Original language: English
- Written by: Thomas D'Urfey
- Genre: Restoration Comedy

Premiere
- Date: August 1685
- Place: Theatre Royal, Drury Lane, London

A Commonwealth of Women is a 1685 comedy play by the English writer Thomas D'Urfey. Originally performed by the United Company as the Theatre Royal, Drury Lane, the cast included Joseph Williams as Captain Marine, Philip Griffin as Du Pier, Thomas Percival as Boldsprite, Thomas Jevon as Franvil, Anthony Leigh as Frugal, Joseph Haines as Hazard, Thomas Gillow as Don Sebastian, John Bowman as Nicusa, Henry Norris as La Mure, Joseph Harris as Bourcher, Katherine Corey as Roselia, Mary Lee as Clarinda, Margaret Osborne as Ariadne, Sarah Cooke as Aminta, Emily Price as Hippolita and Frances Maria Knight as Aglaura.

== Bibliography ==
- Van Lennep, W. The London Stage, 1660–1800: Volume One, 1660–1700. Southern Illinois University Press, 1960.
