= Tom Essence =

1676 play

- Original language: English
- Written by: Thomas Rawlins
- Genre: Restoration comedy
- Setting: Covent Garden, present day

Premiere
- Date: August 1676
- Place: Dorset Garden Theatre, London

Tom Essence; Or, The Modish Wife is a 1676 comedy play by Thomas Rawlins, sometimes also attributed to Edward Ravenscroft. It was first performed at the Dorset Garden Theatre in London by the Duke's Company. Along with Thomas Otway's The Soldier's Fortune, it incorporated scenes from Molière's The Imaginary Cuckold in an otherwise unrelated plot.

The original Dorset Gardens cast included Anthony Leigh as Tom Essence, Thomas Percival as Old Monylove, John Crosby as Courtly, Henry Norris as Loveall, Thomas Gillow as Stanly, John Richards as Laurence, Margaret Hughes as Mrs. Monylove, Elizabeth Barry as Theodocia, Margaret Osborne as Luce, and Anne Shadwell as Mrs. Essence.

== Bibliography ==
- Hughes, Leo. Century of English Farce. Princeton University Press, 2015.
- Van Lennep, W. The London Stage, 1660–1800: Volume One, 1660–1700. Southern Illinois University Press, 1960.
