= The History and Fall of Caius Marius =

1679 tragedy by Thomas Otway

- Original language: English
- Written by: Thomas Otway
- Genre: Tragedy
- Setting: Ancient Rome

Premiere
- Date: October 1679
- Place: Dorset Garden Theatre, London

The History and Fall of Caius Marius is a tragedy written by English writer Thomas Otway. The play was first performed in 1679 and is indebted to William Shakespeare's tragedy, Romeo and Juliet. It is set during the Roman civil wars of Gaius Marius and his rival Sulla.

== History ==
It was originally staged by the Duke's Company at the Dorset Garden Theatre in London. The cast included Thomas Betterton as Caius Marius, Joseph Williams as Sylla, William Smith as Marius Junior, Thomas Percival as Granius, Thomas Gillow as Metellus, Thomas Jevon as Cinna, Cave Underhill as Sulpitius, James Nokes as Nurse and Elizabeth Barry as Lavinia. The published version was dedicated to the politician Lord Falkland.

It was first printed in 1680.

== Legacy ==
Productions of Romeo and Juliet that set Juliet on a raised balcony may derive from Thomas Otway’s play, which explicitly placed the character on a balcony, a detail that Shakespeare's text does not specify.

== Characters ==
The list of characters below:

- Caius Marius
- Sylla
- Marius Junior
- Granius
- Metellus
- Cinna
- Priest
- Apothecary
- Sulpitius
- Quintus Pompeius
- Quintus Pompeius' son
- Lavina
- Nurse

Guards, ruffians and lictors also appear in the play.
