= The Destruction of Troy =

1678 play

- Original language: English
- Written by: John Banks
- Genre: Tragedy
- Setting: Troy, Anatolia

Premiere
- Date: November 1678
- Place: Dorset Garden Theatre, London

The Destruction of Troy is a 1678 tragedy by the English writer John Banks. It was first staged by the Duke's Company at the Dorset Garden Theatre in London. It depicts the Trojan War as inspired by Homer's Iliad and Ovid's Metamorphoses.

The original cast included Samuel Sandford as Priam, Henry Harris as Hector, John Crosby as Paris, Joseph Williams as Troilus, Matthew Medbourne as Agamemnon, Thomas Betterton as Achilles, William Smith as Ulysses, Thomas Gillow as Diomedes, John Bowman as Patroclus, Henry Norris as Menelaus, Cave Underhill as Ajax, Emily Price as Helena, Mary Betterton as Andromache, Elizabeth Barry as Polyxena and Mary Lee as Cassandra.

== Plot ==
Ulysses devises a plan to steal the statue of Minerva that has provided Troy security throughout the war. To do this, the Greeks bribe a Trojan soldier, Antenor, for access to the temple wherein Minerva is located. Afterwards, Ulysses is praised by his fellow generals and soldiers. Angered because he feels he has gotten no credit for his help in physically stealing the statue, Achilles refuses to continue participating in the war. Both the Greeks and the Trojans agree to a three-day truce before a round of one-on-one duels. On the day of the duels, Cassandra warns her brothers, Hector and Troilus, that they will be killed in battle, but both dismiss her warnings. After Hector kills Patroclus, a Greek soldier, Achilles swears revenge but is restrained. Soon afterwards, the Greeks invade the Trojan camps. In the process, Achilles, who has now resumed fighting, kills Hector offstage. As he is rejoicing, he catches sight of Polyxena, Hector's sister, whom he falls in love with at first sight. Priam, King of Troy, arranges a marriage between the two as a way of securing peace. Meanwhile, Ulysses and his fellow princes and generals devise a plan to overtake Troy: the Greeks will deliver a giant wooden horse to the Trojans as a supposed wedding gift, but in reality, it is a device used to hide Greek soldiers who will then exit the interior of the horse and destroy Troy. On the day of the wedding, Paris vows revenge against Achilles for killing Hector, which he achieves when he murders Achilles by shooting his ankle with an arrow. At the moment Achilles is killed, Ulysses's plans come to fruition. Andromache burns to death offstage.

== Critical reception ==
Scholars, such as Derek Hughes and Paula de Pando, see the play as a critique of the traditional "heroic code of conduct".

== Bibliography ==
- Van Lennep, W. The London Stage, 1660-1800: Volume One, 1660-1700. Southern Illinois University Press, 1960.
- Banks, John. The Destruction of Troy a Tragedy, acted at His Royal Highness, the Duke's Theatre. A.G. and J.P., 1679
