= Caesar Borgia (play) =

1679 play

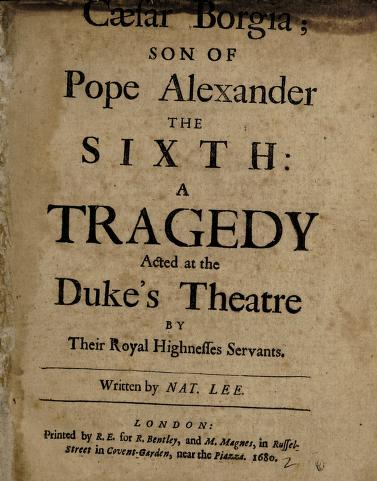
- Written by: Nathaniel Lee
- Original language: English
- Genre: Tragedy
- Setting: Italy, 15th century

Premiere
- Date premiered: May 1679
- Place premiered: Dorset Garden Theatre, London

Caesar Borgia, Son Of Pope Alexander The Sixth is a 1679 tragedy by the English writer Nathaniel Lee. It was first staged at the Dorset Garden Theatre by the Duke's Company. The prologue was provided by John Dryden.

The original cast included Thomas Betterton as Cesar Borgia, Joseph Williams as Palante, William Smith as Machiavel, Thomas Gillow as Paul Orsino, Anthony Leigh as Ascanio Sforza, Thomas Percival as Vitellozzo, Mary Lee as Bellamira and Emily Price as Adorna. The published version was dedicated to the Earl of Pembroke.

== Bibliography ==
- Van Lennep, W. The London Stage, 1660-1800: Volume One, 1660-1700. Southern Illinois University Press, 1960.
