= Mr. Turbulent =

1682 play

- Written by: Anonymous
- Original language: English
- Genre: Restoration Comedy

Premiere
- Date premiered: January 1682
- Place premiered: Dorset Garden Theatre, London

Mr Turbulent; Or, The Melanchollicks is a 1682 comedy play by an anonymous author. It was originally staged by the Duke's Company at the Dorset Garden Theatre in London.

The original cast included Cave Underhill as Timothy Turbulent, Thomas Jevon as Furnish, Thomas Gillow as Hangby, Henry Norris as Grin Sneak, James Nokes as Finical Cringe, John Bowman as Rabsheka Sly, Anthony Leigh as Abednego Suck Thumb, Joseph Williams as Fairlove, John Wiltshire as Friendly, Thomas Percival as Dr Quibus, John Richards as Pollux, Elizabeth Currer as Lady Medler, Mary Lee as Lucia, Emily Price as Priscilla and Margaret Osborne as Mrs Sly.

== Bibliography ==
- Hughes, Leo. Century of English Farce. Princeton University Press, 2015.
- Van Lennep, W. The London Stage, 1660-1800: Volume One, 1660-1700. Southern Illinois University Press, 1960.
