= The Counterfeits =

1678 play

- Original language: English
- Written by: John Leanerd
- Genre: Restoration Comedy

Premiere
- Date: 28 May 1678
- Place: Dorset Garden Theatre, London

The Counterfeits is a 1678 comedy play by the English writer John Leanerd. It was staged by the Duke's Company at the Dorset Garden Theatre with a cast that included Anthony Leigh as Don Gomez, Thomas Gillow as Don Luis, Thomas Betterton as Vitelli, Henry Harris as Antonio, Matthew Medbourne as Carles, William Smith as Peralta, Thomas Percival as Dormilon, Cave Underhill as Fabio, Joseph Williams as Crispin, John Richards as Tonto, Mary Lee as Elvira, Emily Price as Violante and Anne Shadwell as Flora.

== Bibliography ==
- Canfield, J. Douglas. Tricksters and Estates: On the Ideology of Restoration Comedy. University Press of Kentucky, 2014.
- Van Lennep, W. The London Stage, 1660-1800: Volume One, 1660-1700. Southern Illinois University Press, 1960.
