= The Princess of Cleve =

1680 play

- Original language: English
- Written by: Nathaniel Lee
- Genre: Tragedy

Premiere
- Date: September 1680
- Place: Dorset Garden Theatre, London

The Princess of Cleve is a 1680 tragedy by the English writer Nathaniel Lee, inspired by the recent French novel La Princesse de Clèves by Madame de La Fayette set during the sixteenth century. It premiered at the Dorset Garden Theatre in London, staged by the Duke's Company. The original cast included Joseph Williams as Prince of Cleve, Thomas Betterton as Duke Nemours, Anthony Leigh as St. Andre, Thomas Gillow as Vidam of Chartres, James Nokes as Poltrot, Elizabeth Barry as Princess of Cleve, Mary Slingsby as Marguerite, Elinor Leigh as Tournon and Mary Betterton as Elianor. Incidental music was composed by Thomas Farmer. The play was not published until 1689.

== Bibliography ==
- Van Lennep, W. The London Stage, 1660-1800: Volume One, 1660-1700. Southern Illinois University Press, 1960.
