= Circe (play) =

1677 play

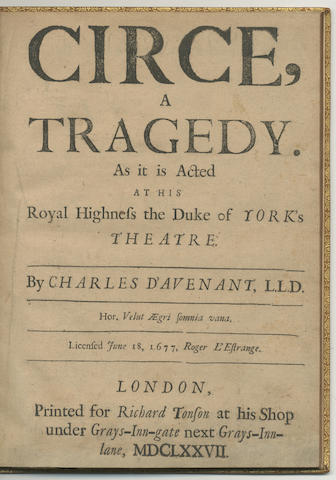
- Original language: English
- Written by: Charles Davenant
- Genre: Tragedy

Premiere
- Date: 12 May 1677
- Place: Dorset Garden Theatre, London

Circe is a 1677 tragedy by the English writer Charles Davenant. It was first staged by the Duke's Company at the Dorset Garden Theatre in London. The play's music was composed by John Banister.

The original cast included Thomas Betterton as Orestes, Joseph Williams as Pylades, William Smith as Ithacus, Henry Harris as Thoas, Mary Lee as Circe and Mary Betterton as Iphigenia.

It was revived, probably in 1690, with additional music by Henry Purcell including six pieces for the revival, including music for instrumental ensembles, vocal soloists, and choirs (Z.575).

In 1984 the play was revived in a period-style production in Cambridge, Massachusetts by Harvard students. The production was produced and directed by James A. Glazier. The production used Purcell and Bannister's original music, with Purcell contrafacta for missing numbers arranged and directed by Paul Merkley. Baroque choreography was provided by Margaret Daniels.

== Bibliography ==
- Van Lennep, W. The London Stage, 1660-1800: Volume One, 1660-1700. Southern Illinois University Press, 1960.
