= John Richards (actor) =

English actor

John Richards was an English stage actor of the seventeenth century. An early member of the Duke's Company in London, he was lured away to the new Smock Alley Theatre in Dublin by John Ogilby. He was back with the Duke's at the Dorset Garden Theatre from the mid-1670s, but while in Ireland he was able to play major roles his English performances were generally supporting parts.

== Selected roles ==
- Fryar in Romeo and Juliet by William Shakespeare (1662)
- Castruchio in The Duchess of Malfi by John Webster (1662)
- Pyrrhus in Mustapha by Roger Boyle (1665)
- Zarrack in Abdelazer by Aphra Behn (1676)
- Prating Shop Keeper in The Wrangling Lovers by Edward Ravenscroft (1676)
- Laurence in Tom Essence by Thomas Rawlins (1676)
- Flaile in Madam Fickle by Thomas D'Urfey (1676)
- Shift in The Cheats of Scapin by Thomas Otway (1676)
- Dameta in Pastor Fido by Elkanah Settle (1676)
- Stephano in The Rover by Aphra Behn (1677)
- Spatterdash in A Fond Husband by Thomas D'Urfey (1677)
- Audacio in The French Conjuror by Thomas Porter (1677)
- Sam in The Counterfeit Bridegroom by Aphra Behn (1677)
- Tonto in The Counterfeits by John Leanerd (1678)
- Curry in Sir Patient Fancy by Aphra Behn (1678)
- Anthenor in Troilus and Cressida by John Dryden (1679)
- Albricio in The Loving Enemies by Lewis Maidwell (1680)
- Bloody Bones in The Souldiers Fortune by Thomas Otway (1680)
- Tom in The London Cuckolds by Edward Ravenscroft (1681)
- Pollux in Mr Turbulent by Anonymous (1682)
- Goslin in Dame Dobson by Edward Ravenscroft (1683)

== Bibliography ==
- Roberts, David. George Farquhar: A Migrant Life Reversed.
- Todd, Janet. The Works of Aphra Behn: v. 6: Complete Plays. Routledge, 2018.
- Van Lennep, W. The London Stage, 1660–1800: Volume One, 1660–1700. Southern Illinois University Press, 1960.
