= The Misery of Civil War =

1680 play

- Original language: English
- Written by: John Crowne
- Genre: Tragedy
- Setting: England, 15th century

Premiere
- Date: February 1680
- Place: Dorset Garden Theatre, London

The Misery of Civil War is a 1680 tragedy by the English writer John Crowne. It was originally staged by the Duke's Company at the Dorset Garden Theatre in London. The play was staged at the height of the Popish Plot, something Crowne addressed in his prologue. Although he states that "by his feeble skill 'tis built alone, The Divine Shakespeare did not lay one Stone" the plot in fact drew heavily on Henry VI, Part 2 and Part 3

The original cast included Joseph Williams as Henry VI of England, William Smith as Edward, John Bowman as Duke of Clarence, Thomas Gillow as Richard, Thomas Betterton as Earl of Warwick, Thomas Percival as Old Lord Clifford, John Wiltshire as Young Clifford, Mary Lee as Queen Margaret, Mary Betterton as Lady Grey and Elizabeth Currer as Lady Eleanor Butler.

== Bibliography ==
- Murray, Barbara A. Restoration Shakespeare: Viewing the Voice. Fairleigh Dickinson University Press, 2001.
- Van Lennep, W. The London Stage, 1660-1800: Volume One, 1660-1700. Southern Illinois University Press, 1960.
