= Love and Revenge (play) =

1674 play

- Original language: English
- Written by: Elkanah Settle
- Genre: Tragedy

Premiere
- Date: November 1674
- Place: Dorset Garden Theatre, London

Love And Revenge is a 1674 tragedy by the English writer Elkanah Settle. It was originally staged by the Duke's Company at the Dorset Garden Theatre in London. The cast featured William Smith as Clotair, John Crosby as Lewis, Henry Norris as Brisack, Matthew Medbourne as Clarmount, Thomas Gillow as Lamot, Thomas Percival as Burbon, Mary Lee as Nigrello, Margaret Osborne as Fredigond and Mary Betterton as Aphelia. When published in 1675 it was dedicated to the Duke of Newcastle, a wealthy aristocrat and patron of the arts.

== Bibliography ==
- Van Lennep, W. The London Stage, 1660-1800: Volume One, 1660-1700. Southern Illinois University Press, 1960.
