= The Royalist =

1682 play

- Original language: English
- Written by: Thomas D'Urfey
- Genre: Restoration Comedy

Premiere
- Date: 23 February 1682
- Place: Dorset Garden Theatre, London

The Royalist is a 1682 comedy play by the English writer Thomas D'Urfey. It was staged at the Dorset Garden Theatre by the Duke's Company, shortly before the merger that created the United Company. It is set during the Commonwealth Era following the English Civil War.

The original cast featured William Smith as Sir Charles Kinglove, Joseph Williams as Heartall, John Bowman as Broom, Anthony Leigh as Sir Oliver Oldcut, Thomas Jevon as Sir Paul Eitherside, Thomas Percival as Captain Jonas, Cave Underhill as Copyhold, George Bright as Slouch and Mary Betterton as Camilla.

== Bibliography ==
- Canfield, J. Douglas. Tricksters and Estates: On the Ideology of Restoration Comedy. University Press of Kentucky, 2014.
- Van Lennep, W. The London Stage, 1660-1800: Volume One, 1660-1700. Southern Illinois University Press, 1960.
