= Regulus (1692 play) =

1692 play

- Original language: English
- Written by: John Crowne
- Genre: Tragedy

Premiere
- Date: June 1692
- Place: Theatre Royal, Drury Lane, London

Regulus is a 1692 tragedy by the English writer John Crowne. It portrays the career of Marcus Atilius Regulus, a Roman Consul at the time of the First Punic War. A separate play of the same title was written by William Havard in 1744.

It was originally performed at the Drury Lane Theatre by the United Company. The cast featured Thomas Betterton as Regulus, Edward Kynaston as Metellus, Elizabeth Barry as Fulvia, William Mountfort as Asdrubal, Anthony Leigh as Gisgon, Cave Underhill as Hiarbas, Thomas Doggett as Batto, Samuel Sandford as Hamilcar and Joseph Williams as Xantippus.

== Bibliography ==
- Van Lennep, W. The London Stage, 1660-1800: Volume One, 1660-1700. Southern Illinois University Press, 1960.
- White, Arthur Franklin. John Crowne: His Life and Dramatic Works. Routledge, 2019.
