= Squire Oldsapp =

1678 play

- Original language: English
- Written by: Thomas D'Urfey
- Genre: Restoration Comedy

Premiere
- Date: June 1678
- Place: Dorset Garden Theatre, London

Squire Oldsapp is a 1678 comedy play by the English writer Thomas D'Urfey. Staged by the Duke's Company at the Dorset Garden Theatre in London, the original cast included Thomas Betterton as Welfore, William Smith as Henry, John Crosby as Lovell, James Nokes as Squire Oldsapp, Anthony Leigh as Sir Frederick Banter, Samuel Sandford as Colonel Buff, Cave Underhill as Pimpo, Emily Price as Christina and Elizabeth Currer as Madame Tricklove.

== Bibliography ==
- Van Lennep, W. The London Stage, 1660-1800: Volume One, 1660-1700. Southern Illinois University Press, 1960.
