= The Banditti (play) =

Play by Thomas D'Urfey

- Original language: English
- Written by: Thomas D'Urfey
- Genre: Comedy

Premiere
- Date: January 1686
- Place: Theatre Royal, Drury Lane, London

The Banditti is a 1686 comedy play by the English writer Thomas D'Urfey. It is also known by the longer title The Banditti: or, a Lady's Distress.

It was originally staged by the United Company at the Drury Lane Theatre. The original cast included Edward Kynaston as Don Antonio, Joseph Williams as Don Fernand, Anthony Leigh as Don Ariell, Cave Underhill as Don Diego, Thomas Gillow as Don Garcia, Thomas Percival as Lopez, Thomas Jevon as Frisco, Philip Griffin as Leon, Sarah Cooke as Dona Elvira, Katherine Corey as Eugenia and James Nokes as Megaera.

== Bibliography ==
- Van Lennep, W. The London Stage, 1660-1800: Volume One, 1660-1700. Southern Illinois University Press, 1960 .
