= Margaret Osborne (actress) =

English actress

Margaret Osborne or Osborn was an English stage actress of the seventeenth century She was a long-standing member of the Duke's Company from 1671, acting at Lincoln's Inn Fields and the Dorset Garden Theatre. She went to Dublin to work at the Smock Alley Theatre in 1677, but returned to the Duke's Company around two years later She subsequently joined the merged United Company in 1682 and was still acting in the 1690s.

== Selected roles ==
- Alexandra in Herod and Mariamne by Samuel Pordage (1671)
- Cornelia in Charles VIII of France by John Crowne (1671)
- Lady Turnup in The Morning Ramble by Henry Nevil Payne (1672)
- Flora in The Fatal Jealousy by Henry Nevil Payne (1672)
- Old Lady in The Duchess of Malfi by John Webster (1672)
- Mrs Clappam in The Careless Lovers by Edward Ravenscroft (1673)
- Lelia in The Reformation by Joseph Arrowsmith (1673)
- Fredigond in Love and Revenge by Elkanah Settle (1674)
- Elvira in Abdelazer by Aphra Behn (1676)
- Luce in Tom Essence by Thomas Rawlins (1676)
- Widow Laudwell in The Counterfeit Bridegroom by Aphra Behn (1677)
- Florella in The Orphan by Thomas Otway (1680)
- Jane in The London Cuckolds by Edward Ravenscroft (1681)
- Jacinta in The False Count by Aphra Behn (1681)
- Mrs Sly in Mr. Turbulent by Anonymous (1682)
- Mrs Helen in Dame Dobson by Edward Ravenscroft (1683)
- Ariadne in A Commonwealth of Women by Thomas D'Urfey (1685)
- Grycia in The Amorous Bigotte by Thomas Shadwell (1690)
- Lady Hazard in Greenwich Park by William Mountfort (1691)
- Teareshift in Love for Money by Thomas D'Urfey (1691)

== Bibliography ==
- Bush-Bailey, Gilli. Treading the bawds: Actresses and playwrights on the Late Stuart stage. Manchester University Press, 2013.
- Lanier, Henry Wysham. The First English Actresses: From the Initial Appearance of Women on the Stage in 1660 Till 1700. The Players, 1930.
- Van Lennep, W. The London Stage, 1660–1800: Volume One, 1660–1700. Southern Illinois University Press, 1960.
