= Margaret Osborne =

Margaret Osborne may refer to:

- Margaret Osborne (actress) (fl. 1671-1691), English stage actress of the 17th century
- Margaret Osborne (table tennis) (1913-1987), English table tennis player
- Margaret Osborne duPont (1918–2012), née Margaret Osborne, US tennis player
- Maggie Osborne (born 1941), American author with work nominated for RITA Award
- Margaret Osborn (born 1988), better known as Alice Glass, Canadian singer and songwriter
