= Brutus of Alba =

Brutus of Alba may refer to:

- An alternative name for the legendary figure Brutus of Troy
- Brutus of Alba (play), a 1678 play by the Irish writer Nahum Tate
- Brutus of Alba (opera), a 1696 semi-opera by Daniel Purcell to a libretto by George Powell
