= Love and a Bottle =

1698 play

- Written by: George Farquhar
- Original language: English
- Genre: Restoration comedy

Premiere
- Date premiered: December 1698
- Place premiered: Drury Lane Theatre

Love and a Bottle is a 1698 comedy play by the Irish writer George Farquhar. Written shortly after Farquhar, an Irish Protestant originally from Derry, moved to London its central character is an Irishman Roebuck who has fled from Ireland after getting a woman pregnant. Resisting his father's demand that he marry the woman, he is followed to the English capital by the recent mother of his son.

The original Drury Lane cast included Joseph Williams as Roebuck, John Mills as Lovewell, William Bullock as Mockmade, Benjamin Johnson as Lyrick, Joseph Haines as Pamphlet, William Pinkethman as Club, Jane Rogers as Lucinda, Mary Powell as Bulfinch, Henrietta Moore as Pindress, Maria Allison as Leanthe and Margaret Mills as Trudge. The published version was dedicated to the Marques of Carmarthen.

His debut work in England, it lacked the impact that his subsequent work The Constant Couple had. However, following the success of his later plays it became a commonly-performed work during the eighteenth century.

== Bibliography ==
- Earnshaw, Steven. The Pub in Literature: England's Altered State. Manchester University Press, 2000.
