= A Duke and No Duke =

1684 play by Nahum Tate

- Written by: Nahum Tate
- Original language: English
- Genre: Restoration Comedy

Premiere
- Date premiered: August 1684
- Place premiered: Theatre Royal, Drury Lane, London

A Duke and No Duke is a 1684 comedy play by the Irish writer Nahum Tate. It was originally staged by the United Company at the Drury Lane Theatre in London with a cast including John Wiltshire as Lavinio, Thomas Gillow as Barberino, Joseph Williams as Alberto, Anthony Leigh as Trappolin, Thomas Percival as Mago, Elizabeth Currer as Isabella and Susannah Percival as Prudentia.

== Bibliography ==
- Canfield, J. Douglas. Tricksters and Estates: On the Ideology of Restoration Comedy. University Press of Kentucky, 2014.
- Van Lennep, W. The London Stage, 1660-1800: Volume One, 1660-1700. Southern Illinois University Press, 1960.
