= 1686 in literature =

This article contains information about the literary events and publications of 1686.

== Events ==
- January – John Dryden is recorded as having converted to Roman Catholicism.

== New books ==
=== Prose ===
- Pierre Bayle – Philosophical Commentary (on religious freedom)
- Bernard de Fontenelle
  - Entretiens sur la pluralité des mondes (Conversations on the Plurality of Worlds)
  - L'Histoire des oracles
- Gottfried Leibniz
  - Brevis Demonstratio Erroris Memorabilis Cartesii et Aliorum Circa Legem Naturae (A Brief Demonstration of the Memorable Error of Descartes and Others About the Law of Nature)
  - Discours de Métaphysique
- Ihara Saikaku (井原 西鶴)
  - Twenty Cases of Unfilial Children (本朝二十不孝 Honchō Nijū Fukō)
  - The Life of an Amorous Woman (好色一代女 Kōshoku Ichidai Onna)
- Thomas Sydenham – Schedula monitoria de novae febris ingressu (Schedule of Symptoms of Newly Arrived Fever)

=== Children ===
- John Bunyan – A Book for Boys and Girls, or, Country Rhymes for Children

=== Drama ===
- Aphra Behn and John Blow – The Lucky Chance
- Thomas d'Urfey – The Banditti
- Thomas Jevon – The Devil of a Wife

=== Poetry ===
- Anne Killigrew (posthumously) – Poems

== Births ==
- January 17 – Archibald Bower, Scottish historian (died 1766)
- August 12 – John Balguy, English philosopher (died 1748)
- September 5 – Antoine Touron, French historian and biographer (died 1775)
- unknown date – Alban Thomas, Welsh physician and antiquarian (died 1771)

== Deaths ==
- January 31 – Jean Mairet, French dramatist (born 1604)
- February 6 – Dorothy White, English Quaker pamphleteer (born c. 1630)
- February 10 – William Dugdale, English antiquary and herald (born 1605)
- February 25 – Abraham Calovius, German Lutheran theologian (born 1612)
- June 23 – Sir William Coventry, English statesman and author (born c. 1628)
- July 10 – John Fell, English academic and bishop (born 1625)
- August 13 – Louis Maimbourg, French Jesuit historian (born 1610)
- November 25 – Nicolas Steno (Niels Steenson), Danish scientist (born 1638)
- November 28 – Nicolas Letourneux, French religious writer (born 1640)
- December 6 – Nicola Avancini, Italian Jesuit writer (born 1612)
