= Sir Courtly Nice =

1685 play

- Original language: English
- Written by: John Crowne
- Genre: Comedy

Premiere
- Date: 9 May 1685
- Place: Theatre Royal, Drury Lane, London

Sir Courtly Nice: Or, It Cannot Be is a 1685 comedy play by the English writer John Crowne. Rehearsals by the United Company were underway when the death of Charles II in February led to the closure of all theatres as a mark of respect. The play was eventually staged on 9 May at the Theatre Royal, Drury Lane. It is the tradition of the Restoration Comedy. A popular hit, it became a stock part of the repertoire for more than a century, with Colley Cibber and Anne Oldfield appearing in a celebrated 1709 revival.

The original cast included William Mountfort as Sir Courtly, Cave Underhill as Hothead, Thomas Gillow as Testimony, William Mountfort as Lord Beaugard, Philip Griffin as Surly, Anthony Leigh as Sir Nicholas Callico and Elizabeth Barry as Leonora. Crowne made an attempt to balance the politics of the time by creating a Hothead, a hardline Tory character to balance out the Puritan Whig zealot Testimony but the play still revealed the author's underlying support for the Tory position. The published version was dedicated to the Duke of Ormonde.

== Bibliography ==
- Schneider Jr., Ben Ross. The Ethos of Restoration Comedy. University of Illinois Press, 1971.
- Van Lennep, W. The London Stage, 1660-1800: Volume One, 1660-1700. Southern Illinois University Press, 1960.
- White, Arthur Franklin. John Crowne: His Life and Dramatic Works. Routledge, 2019.
