= Brutus of Alba (play) =

1678 play

- Written by: Nahum Tate
- Original language: English
- Genre: Tragedy

Premiere
- Date premiered: June 1678
- Place premiered: Dorset Garden Theatre, London

Brutus of Alba; Or, The Enchanted Lovers is a 1678 tragedy by the Irish writer Nahum Tate. It was first performed by the Duke's Company at the Dorset Garden Theatre in London. The name's of the original cast are unknown. The published version was dedicated to the Duke of Dorset.

It was based on the fourth book of the Aeneid by Virgil, and was produced in the context of the Exclusion Crisis. Tate was at the time a supporter of James, Duke of York and the play is strongly propagandistic about the Stuart monarchy. Tate later took elements of the play for the libretto of Dido and Aeneas, scored by Henry Purcell.

== Bibliography ==
- Van Lennep, W. The London Stage, 1660-1800: Volume One, 1660-1700. Southern Illinois University Press, 1960.
- Welch, Anthony. The Renaissance Epic and the Oral Past. Yale University Press, 2012.
