= Faithful Teate =

Faithful Teate (c. 1626 – 1666) was a Protestant clergyman and poet from County Cavan, Ireland. He is sometimes known as Faithful Tate or Faithfull Teate. He was the father of the poet laureate, Nahum Tate.

== Background ==
He was the son of Faithful Teate, a doctor of divinity with whom he has often been confused. The elder Teate was made Rector at Ballyhaise, Co. Cavan, and purchased lands in and around Ballyhaise during the Plantation of Ulster. Reports that he had informed on the rebels during the Irish Rebellion of 1641, resulted in his house being burned. Two or three (sources vary) of Teate's children are reported to have died as a result of hardships endured in that period.

== Career and poetry ==
Faithful Teate the younger entered Trinity College Dublin in 1641 at age fourteen and was later ordained into the Church of Ireland. He moved to England and studied at Pembroke College, Cambridge before being appointed minister at Sudbury in Suffolk in 1648. He was back in Dublin by 1660 and was rector of St Werburgh's Church in Dublin, but his puritan principles did not allow him to accept the new restoration government's policy on episcopacy and he was ejected. He died at the age of forty in 1666.

While at Suffolk he composed a long meditative poem Ter Tria: or the Doctrine of the Three Sacred Persons, Father, Son and Spirit... (1658). The poem enjoyed considerable success in its day. It was reprinted in 1669 and a German edition and translation followed in 1699. He also wrote didactic prose including A Scripture Map of the Wilderness of Sin and Way to Canaan (1655). The first modern edition of his complete poetical works was published by Four Courts Press in 2007.

== Family ==
This second Faithful Teate was the father of the poet laureate Nahum Tate, who went by 'Tate' rather than 'Teate' only in adulthood. Nahum was the second of seven children born to Faithful and his wife Katherine Kenetie. The eldest of these children was also called 'Faithful'. As noted above, there is considerable confusion in earlier accounts of the family, where it was stated that the first Faithful Teate was the father, instead of the grandfather, of Nahum. There are, in fact, three 'Faithful' Teates, the grandfather, father and brother of Nahum Tate.
