= Placido Puccinelli =

Italian monk, historian and scholar (1609–1685)

Dom Placido Puccinelli OSB
- Title: abbot

Personal life
- Born: 1609 Pescia, Grand Duchy of Tuscany
- Died: 1685 (aged 75–76) Florence, Grand Duchy of Tuscany
- Resting place: Badia Fiorentina
- Occupation: Cassinese monk; Historian

Religious life
- Religion: Roman Catholicism
- Order: Benedictines
- Ordination: 17 January 1626

Dom Placido Puccinelli OSB (1609 – 1685) was a Cassinese monk, historian and scholar.

== Biography ==
Placido Puccinelli was born at Pescia and educated at the abbey of S. Maria in Florence. He began his monastic career on 15 January 1626. For a long time, he was itinerant, travelling between the cities of northern Italy. At one time he was a master of novices at Gessate. He frequented the then-young Ambrosian Library in Milan, founded by Cardinal Federico Borromeo. Back in Florence, he served in various offices at the Badia Fiorentina. He wrote numerous works based on unpublished documents from the Badia's archive. He died in the Badia Fiorentina in 1685.

Puccinelli was interested in historical studies, but above all genealogy and prosopography, in which the abbey had a tradition. He modelled his style after that of the historian of Lucca, Francesco Maria Fiorentini, whom he befriended. Another scholarly friendship was with Giovanni Pietro Puricelli. Like Puricelli he wrote on the history of the Humiliati.

== Works ==
- Historia dell'eroiche attioni della gran dama Vuilla principessa della Toscana, duchessa di Spoleto, e contessa di Camerino. Naples: nella Stamperia di Francesco Savio. 1643.
- Historia di Ugo, principe della Toscana. Venice: Matteo Leni and Giovanni Vecellio. 1643.
- Cronica della Badia Fiorentina. Florence. 1645.
- Historia dell'eroiche attioni de' BB. Gometio Portughese abbate di Badia, e di Teuzzone Romito, con la serie delle badesse dell'insigne monastero delle Murate di Fiorenza. Milan: Gio. Pietro Ramellati. 1645.
- Memorie antiche di Milano e d'alcuni altri luoghi dello Stato. Milan: per Gio. Battista, e Giulio Cesare fratelli Malatesta Stampatori R. C. 1650.
- Vita di S. Simpliciano Arcivescovo di Milano. Milan: Malatesti stampatori. 1650.
- Memorie dell'insigne e nobile terra di Pescia. Milan. 1664.
- Istoria dell'eroiche attioni di Ugo il Grande. Milan: nella R.D. corte, per Giulio Cesare Malatesta stampatore R.C. 1664.
- Memorie sepolcrali dell'abbadia fiorentina e d'altri monasteri, come ancora de' magnati Carolingi, e d'altri personaggi cospicui. Milan. 1664.

== Bibliography ==
- Schenone, Simona (1988). "La vita e le opere di Placido Puccinelli: cenni per una biografia". Archivio storico lombardo. 114: 319–334.
- Ceriotti, Luca (2024). "Forme e colori nelle cronache di Placido Puccinelli". Pinger cantando. Arti sorelle a Milano tra Cinque e Seicento. Città di Castello: I Libri di Emil. pp. 189–197. ISBN 978-8866805069.
