= John Banks (playwright) =

English playwright

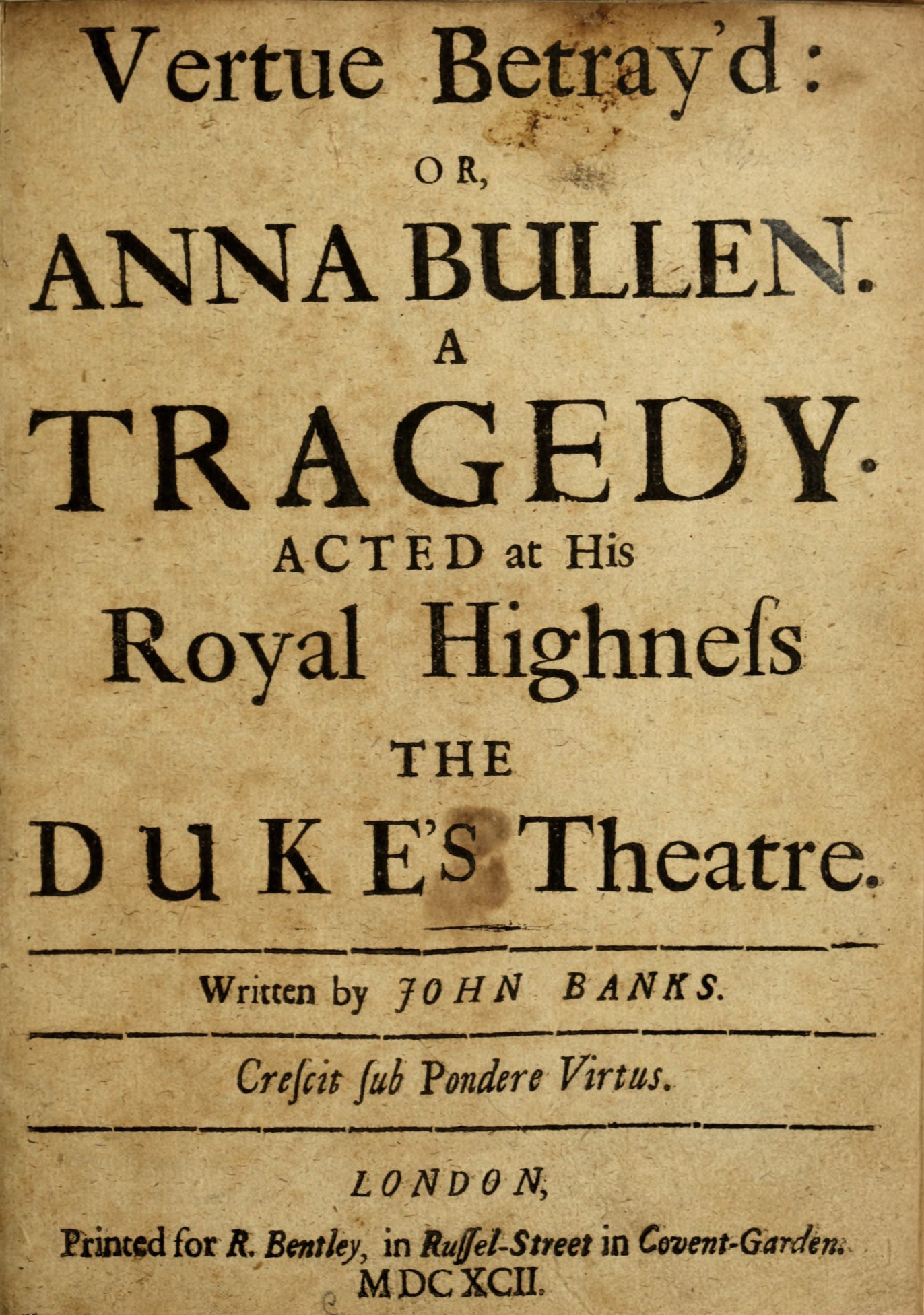
Title page of the second edition of Vertue Betray'd, or Anna Bullen (1692)

John Banks (1650–1706) was an English playwright of the Restoration era. His works concentrated on historical dramas, and his plays were twice suppressed because of their implications, or supposed implications, for the contemporaneous political situation.

Virtually nothing is known about Banks's early life; his date of birth has been estimated on the basis of his later biography. He studied law at the New Inn, one of the minor Inns of Chancery attached to the Middle Temple. Banks's first play was The Rival Kings of 1677, written in imitation of Nathaniel Lee's The Rival Queens of the same year. Banks followed this with The Destruction of Troy, which was staged by the Duke's Company at the Dorset Garden Theatre in November 1678 and printed the following year. The Unhappy Favourite, or the Earl of Essex (1682), for which John Dryden provided a prologue and epilogue, was his first major success. Virtue Betrayed, or Anna Bullen, published the same year, proved to be his most popular play, and was acted as late as 1766.

Banks was considered a crude writer who could nonetheless, at his best, create powerful drama. His next play, however, was judged more crude than powerful: The Innocent Usurper, based on the life of Lady Jane Grey, was disliked by both the King's Company and the Duke's Company. He tried to stage The Innocent Usurper again in 1693, but on this second attempt the play was banned for political reasons. It was eventually published in 1694. The Island Queens, or the Death of Mary Queen of Scotland (1684), had a similar history: originally banned on political grounds, it was published in 1686, and eventually successfully staged as The Albion Queens, twenty years after its creation.

His last drama was Cyrus the Great, inspired by Le Grand Cyrus of Madeleine de Scudéry. The acting companies resisted this work because of its perceived low quality, but it proved to be another success once staged, by the King's Company at Lincoln's Inn Fields.
