= Joseph Haines =

Joseph Haines (died 4 April 1701), also known as Jo Haines, was a 17th-century actor, singer, dancer, guitar player, fortune teller, and author.

The Life of the Late Famous Comedian, Jo. Hayns, possibly written by fellow player Tobias Thomas, "must contain some grains of truth, but is so riddled with fancy that one can scarcely sort them out", according to the Biographical Dictionary of Actors (Highfill, et al. 1973–93). Nothing certain is known of Haines' early life. He joined a troupe of strolling players in Cambridge in 1667, joined a company of young performers at the Hatton Garden "nursery" in London in 1668, and there caught the eye of Thomas Killigrew and was invited to join Killigrew's patent company, the King's Company.

Haines soon became well known as a song-and-dance man, comedian, and eccentric. He was persistently dogged by debt and money problems, and was several times fired from the company for "ill & scandalous language & insolent carriage" by leading actor Charles Hart. As a result, Haines returned to becoming a travelling performer, sometimes going abroad to Paris or Florence. Nevertheless, Haines was apparently such a draw for the King's Company, and after 1682 for the United Company, that he was always allowed to return.

In 1693 he set himself up as fortune teller. He wrote several plays, none of which had notable artistic or commercial success, and gave several of his best interpretations (according to Anthony Aston) in the 1690s, including Serringe the doctor in John Vanbrugh's The Relapse (1696) and the original Tom Errand in George Farquhar's immensely popular The Constant Couple (1699). He died at his London lodgings in 1701 after a short illness.

== Sources ==
- Highfill, Philip Jr, Burnim, Kalman A., and Langhans, Edward (1973–93). Biographical Dictionary of Actors, Actresses, Musicians, Dancers, Managers and Other Stage Personnel in London, 1660–1800. 16 volumes. Carbondale, Illinois: Southern Illinois University Press.
