= The Duke of Guise (play) =

Restoration tragedy by Dryden and Lee

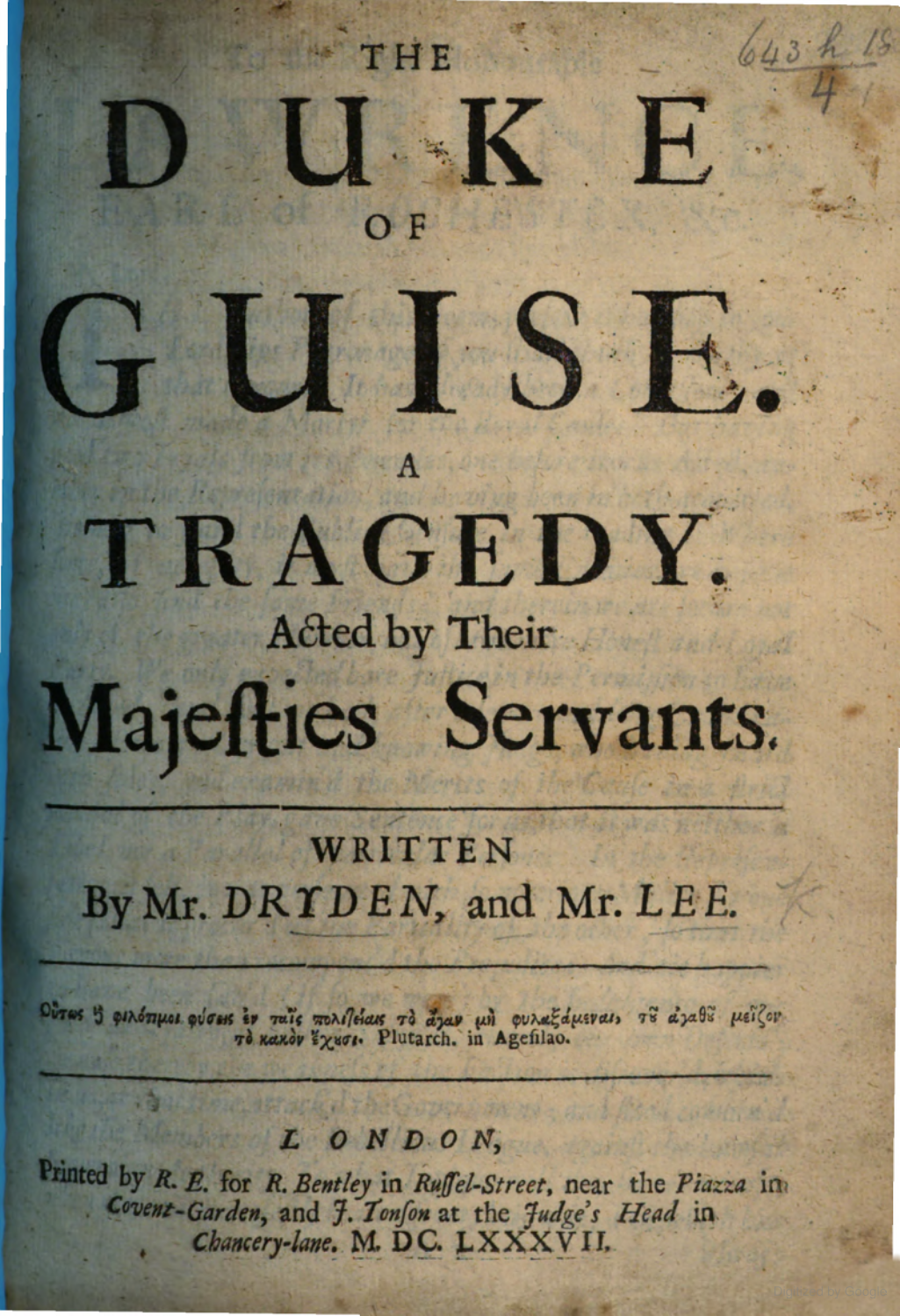
- Title page of the 1687 edition
- Written by: John Dryden
- Genre: Tragedy

Premiere
- Date: 4 December 1682

The Duke of Guise, a Tragedy is a tragedy by John Dryden and Nathaniel Lee, published in 1683.

== Characters ==
- The King of France.
- Duke of Guise.
- Duke of Mayenne.
- Grillon, Colonel of the Guard.
- Alphonso Corso, a Colonel.
- Belleure, a Courtier.
- Royalists.
  - Abbot del Bene,
  - M. Monfert,
- Of Guise's Faction.
  - The Cardinal of Guise.
  - Archbishop of Lyons.
  - Polin,
  - Aumale,
  - Bussy,
  - The Curate of St Eustace,
  - Malicorn, a Necromancer,
  - Melanax, a Spirit,
- Two Sheriffs,
- Citizens and Rabble, &c.
- Queen Mother.
- Marmoutiere, Niece to Grillon.

== History ==
Dryden co-operated with Nathaniel Lee in producing the Duke of Guise. The story, which in Dryden's early effort had been intended to suggest a parallel to the English rebellion, was now to be applied to the contest of the court against Shaftesbury and Monmouth. Dryden, however, did his best to extenuate his own responsibility in a Vindication of the Duke of Guise separately published.

The play was performed by the United Companies, and printed in 1683. It was first acted on 4 December 1682, and encountered a stormy and dubious, if not an unfavourable, reception. The piece was ultimately enabled to maintain its ground with more general approbation.

== Bibliography ==
- Hammond, Paul (2004). "Dryden, John (1631–1700), poet, playwright, and critic". In Oxford Dictionary of National Biography. Oxford University Press.
- Scott, Walter, ed. (1808). The Works of John Dryden, Now First Collected in Eighteen Volumes. Vol. 7. Edinburgh: Printed for William Miller by James Ballantyne and Co. pp. 1–208.
- Stephen, Leslie (1888). "Dryden, John" . In Stephen, Leslie (ed.). Dictionary of National Biography. Vol. 16. London: Smith, Elder & Co. pp. 64–75.
- The Duke of Guise a tragedy: acted by Their Majesties servants / written by Mr. Dryden and Mr. Lee. Printed by T. H. for R. Bentley ... and J. Tonson ... 1683.
- The True History of the Duke of Guise. Extracted Out of Thuanus, Mezeray, Mr Aubeny's Memoirs, and the Journal of the Reign of Henry the Third of France. Published for the Undeceiving Such as May Perhaps be Imposed Upon by Mr. Dryden's Late Tragedy of the Duke of Guise. London: Printed and are to be Sold by R. Baldwin, 1683.
