= Charles Davenant =

English economist and politician (1656–1714)

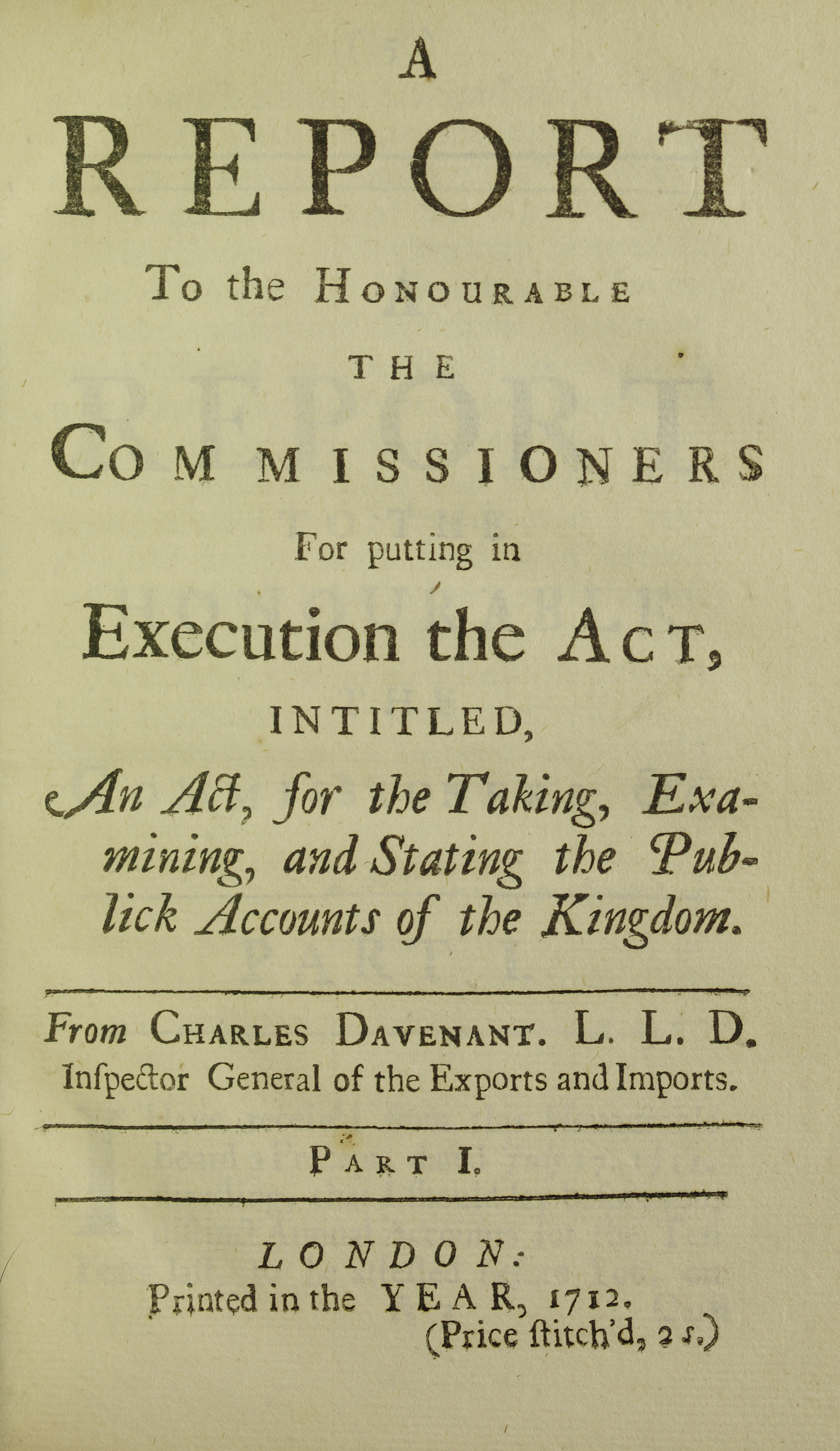
Report to the honourable the commissioners, 1712

Charles Davenant (1656 – 1714) was an English economist, Tory politician and pamphleteer who sat in the Parliament of England representing the parliamentary constituencies of St Ives and Great Bedwyn.

== Life ==
He was born in London as the eldest son of Sir William Davenant, the poet. He was educated at Cheam grammar school and Balliol College, Oxford, but left the university without taking a degree. He became manager of his father's theatre. Having taken the degree of LL.D., he became a member of Doctors' Commons.

In 1678 Davenant was appointed Commissioner of the Excise, earning £500 per year (equivalent to £98,000 in 2023); taxes were collected using the "farming system". In 1683 when Britain ended the tax farming system, Davenant received £1000 per year as Commissioner. In 1685 he was elected to Parliament as M.P. for St Ives. However, the revolution of 1688 saw James II exiled to France and William of Orange installed as king by Parliament. In 1689 Davenant lost his position as Commissioner of the Excise, and his loan to James II was nullified.

In 1692 he applied for Controller of the Excise, with Godolphin's support, but did not get the position. He applied again in 1694 and again failed to get the position, probably due to objections by Charles Montagu, the Chancellor of the Exchequer. In 1696 his friends in government, Shrewsbury and Godolphin, were under political attack. Godolphin resigned shortly afterward, and Davenant lost his main supporter for appointment to a public office.

In 1698 Davenant returned to Parliament as a representative of Great Bedwyn; he became associated with the Tory party, which replaced the Whig Junto as the majority in Parliament. Davenant was linked to French agents in March 1701, and it was suspected, but not proved, that the French government tried to bribe him to promote their interests and to provide intelligence if England declared war on France. There is evidence that a French agent recommended bribing Davenant, but there is no evidence that "a bribe was ever actually offered or accepted." The link with the French tarnished Davenant's public and political reputation.

In 1702 Queen Anne assumed the throne. The Junto Pembroke Ministry was removed from power, and Davenant's friends—Godolphin, Nottingham, and Harley—were placed in positions of power in the Coalition Ministry. In September 1702 Davenant was appointed to the Secretaryship of a commission to negotiate for the union of Scotland and England. In June 1703 he was appointed Inspector General of the Imports and Exports.

Davenant visited Holland in Autumn 1705, to research wartime traffic with France.

In 1710 Godolphin lost his office, which removed one of Davenant's supporters from power and threatened his position as Inspector General of the Imports and Exports. Davenant wrote Sir Thomas Double at Court and New Dialogues upon the Present Posture of Affairs to make amends with the Tory party, which was likely to be returning to power. Sir Thomas Double at Court reversed Davenant's argument for moderation in his 1703 Essays upon Peace at Home and War Abroad; and New Dialogues upon the Present Posture of Affairs repeated the attacks on the methods of financing public spending that he had been stating since 1689. He also reversed his stance from Memorial Concerning the Free Trade now Tolerated between France and Holland and argued that the Dutch were benefitting from trade with France while "Britain bore the burden of the war."

Davenant died in 1714 in London.

== Works ==
At the age of nineteen he composed a tragedy, Circe. As an economist, Davenant was a strong supporter of the mercantile theory, and in his economic pamphlets (as distinct from his political writings) he takes up an eclectic position, recommending governmental restrictions on colonial commerce, but freedom of exchange at home.

Of his writings, a complete edition of which was published in London in 1771, the following are the more important:

- An Essay on the East India Trade (1697)
- Two Discourses on the Public Revenues and Trade of England (1698)
- An Essay on the probable means of making the people gainers in the balance of Trade (1699)
- A Discourse on Grants and Resumptions and Essays on the Balance of Power (1701)

In late 1694 he published An Essay on the Ways and Means of supplying the War, "a reasoned criticism of the methods used to finance the war with France which England had been waging since 1689. It attacked long-term borrowing as detrimental to trade, and land taxation as inequitable, because of its uneven incidence across the country."

In November 1695 he wrote and read Memorial Concerning the Coyn of England to the Privy Council. This work, commissioned by the Lords Justices, was an argument against the majority party's proposal that England's coins should be devalued to pay for the war with France.

In 1696 he published A Memorial Concerning a Council of Trade, which promoted his idea that trade should be protected, and A Memorial Concerning Credit and the Means and Methods whereby it may be Restored, generally viewed as an attempt to curry favour with the party in power to gain a post in the Excise department. In October 1696 he published Essay on Publick Virtue, a diatribe against the ruling Whig Junto. In 1696, also, he published Essay on the East India Trade in which he "opposed the protection of English Textiles against Indian competition on the grounds that commerce with East India improved Britain's balance of trade, and he refuted the arguments of the protectionists with further applications of the balance of trade concept."

In 1697 he published Discourses on the Publick Revenues and on the Trade of England, part 1, which contained strong objections to long-term borrowing as a way to fund government expenditures and advocated paying back the debt incurred during the war as soon as possible. The basis for Davenant's argument was that "high taxation for debt service was a burden on trade, industry, and land." Davenant still believed that land tax was unfair because it placed the heaviest burden of generating public income on the landed gentry, and that the long-term result would be that the gentry would be forced to sell their land to "monied men and usurers" to pay the taxes.

In 1698 he published Discourses on the Publick Revenues and on the Trade of England part 2, which described "in a more sustained and complete form the idea of the 'general' balance of trade." There is a likely possibility that this pamphlet was also intended to keep his name before the officials of the East India Company as someone who was sympathetic to their business because he was trying to get them to hire him as an agent.

In early 1699 he published An Essay on the probable Methods of making a People Gainers in the Balance of Trade. It quoted Gregory King's calculation of the value and size of the "natural resources of England." The last section contained an attack on the actions and policies of the Junto party and was more of a political rant than an exposition of economic ideas. At the end of 1699 he published A Discourse of Grants and Resumptions, which discussed the practice of the king and queen of England granting "forfeited Irish Estates" to friends and political allies of the Junto party. Davenant's writings begin to shift away from purely economic discussions to political commentary designed to curry favour with the ruling party to secure employment. In 1701 he published Essays upon I The Balance of Power II The Right of Making War, Peace, and Alliances III Universal Monarchy, "a highly partisan attack on William III's foreign policy."

In August 1701 Davenant published The True Picture of a Modern Whig, an attempt to counter the Whig party's push to dissolve the Tory party Parliament by "defending Tory views and exposing Whig motives." His Tom Double Returned out of the Country, also published 1701, explained all of Davenant's ideas on trade and public finance and the underlying reasoning behind them. His main concern was that the Whig party would restart the war with France and put the country further into debt, which would in turn require greater taxation of land owners. The land owners would be bankrupted, and the people who had made money off the war would be able to buy the land and usurp the political power of the gentry.

His Essays upon Peace at Home and War Abroad, published November 1703, "promoted 'moderation' and the anti-party attitude favoured by the Queen and Harley." This pamphlet angered his friends in the Tory party because it was in opposition to the policies the party was pushing at the time. Before 1702, he was the leading promoter of party ideas. With this essay, he was falling out of favour and gaining a reputation for promoting whatever idea benefits him the most personally.

In 1704 Davenant proposed compiling trade numbers for the previous 25 years. The cost of clerks to do the actual tabulation was the primary reason for denial of his request. He wrote, but did not publish, Memorial Concerning the Free Trade now Tolerated between France and Holland. The goal was to find support for the current policy of permitting trade between France and Holland. Davenant displayed a favourable opinion of the Dutch in this pamphlet, which contrasts with the position taken in nearly all his other pamphlets.

In 1709 Davenant published Reflections upon the Constitution and Management of Trade to Africa, in which he "reverted to his normal attitude of suspicion and outright hostility towards the Dutch." This pamphlet advocated renewing the Royal African Company's monopoly on English trade with Africa on the basis that the Dutch competition "necessitated the maintenance of forts, which only a joint-stock company could afford." Waddell states that there had been close collaboration between the company and Davenant and that he may have been compensated for writing it. He did go to great lengths to publish the pamphlet anonymously, and was apparently in a difficult financial position; Waddell therefore suggests that this was a work-for-hire and not necessarily something which Davenant actually supported.

In 1712 Davenant published two Reports to the … Commissioners for … Public Accounts. Although these reports contained a large amount of statistical data, they continued the theme from "New Dialogues upon the Present Posture of Affairs" that Holland benefitted from trade with France while Britain took on heavy debt during the war with France and that trade with France "was or could be advantageous to England." This coincided with Jonathan Swift's Conduct of the Allies and provided the economic basis for peace and a commercial treaty with France.

There is some question whether the Law of Demand was developed by Gregory King and then used in some of Charles Davenant's writings or whether King and Davenant jointly developed the idea based on King's statistical work and published their theory in Davenant's pamphlets. King does not describe a formal definition of the law in his journal, which is the primary source of his writings, and Davenant does not seem to be an innovative thinker and often wrote pamphlets to promote ideas or policies that would be beneficial to his personal economic or political status; therefore, it seems likely Davenant extended King's work to prove his claims that borrowing to fund the war was bad for England's economy and that excise taxes were the appropriate way to fund the government.

Davenant is also credited with being the first to discuss the concept of Balance of Trade as being an important part of the financial health of a country. The foundation of the idea is that importing more goods than were exported would create an outflow of currency. He proposed in An Essay on Ways and Means of Supplying the War in 1695 that "export surplus was the best way to finance the war" as opposed to taking on long-term debt and increasing taxes on landowners.

In 1696, Davenant wrote Essay on the East-India Trade, which continued the argument that imports should not be restricted because England was a net exporter of the goods imported from India. The restriction of imports would prevent re-exporting the goods to the rest of Europe, and that would decrease the total income of the government. He also expressed a great dislike and distrust of the Dutch government for most of his life, and feared that if Britain did not supply Indian imports the Dutch would supply Europe instead. He did seem to be the first to understand the basic concepts of consumer demand and perfect competition, even though bias against the Dutch stems more from fear of a political challenger to England than fear of losing the competitive advantage of England's monopoly in India.

== See also ==
- Gross domestic product
