= Thomas Rawlins =

English medallist and playwright

Thomas Rawlins (1620?–1670) was an English medallist and playwright.

== Life ==
Born about 1620, Rawlins appears to have received instruction as a goldsmith and gem engraver, and to have worked under Nicholas Briot at the Royal Mint.

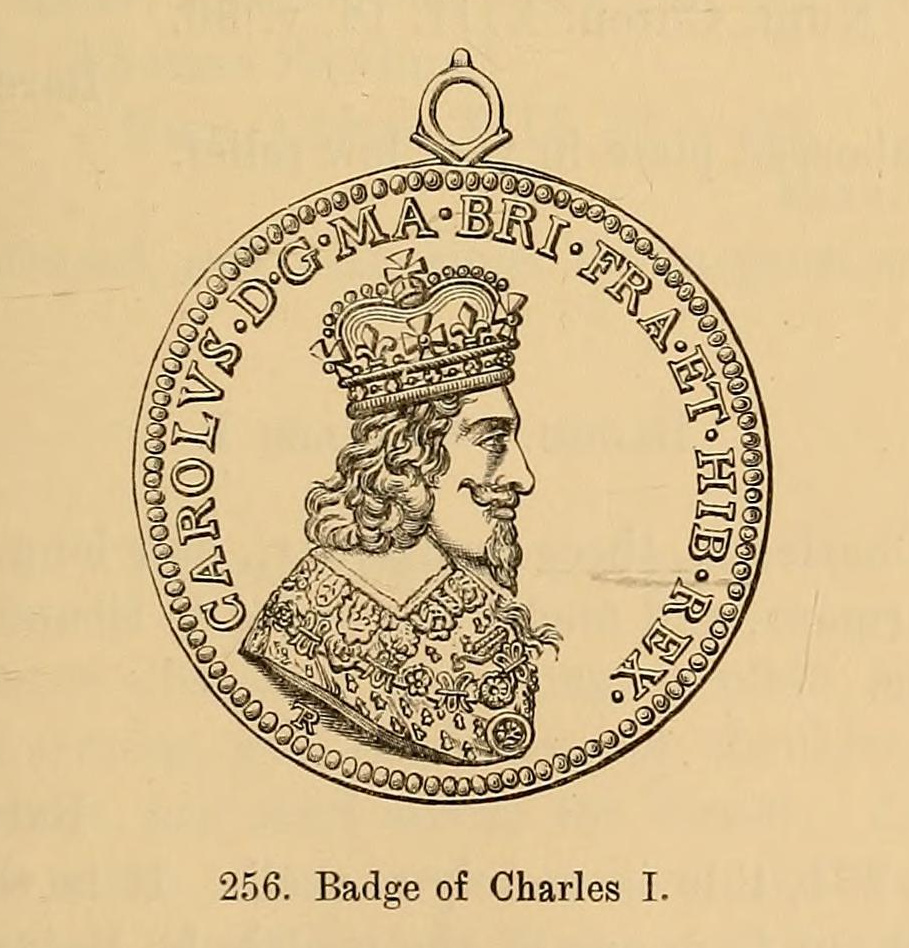
Badge of Charles I by Thomas Rawlins

Rawlins's first dated medal is from 1641. Shortly afterwards, on the outbreak of the First English Civil War, he went to the king's headquarters at Oxford. His signature appears on coins of the Oxford mint, 1644–1646, and in 1644 he produced the crown piece known as the "Oxford crown", from the view of Oxford introduced beneath the ordinary equestrian type of the obverse of the coin. In 1643 he prepared the badge given to the "Forlorn Hope", and received a warrant (1 June 1643) for making the special medal conferred on Sir Robert Welch. He struck at Oxford a medal commemorating the taking of Bristol by Prince Rupert's forces (1643), and until 1648 was employed in making medals and badges for the king's supporters. Rawlins also designed a pattern sovereign of Charles I, and the so-called "Juxon medal", probably the pattern for a five-broad piece. He was formally appointed chief engraver of the mint in the twenty-third year of Charles I (March 1647–March 1648).

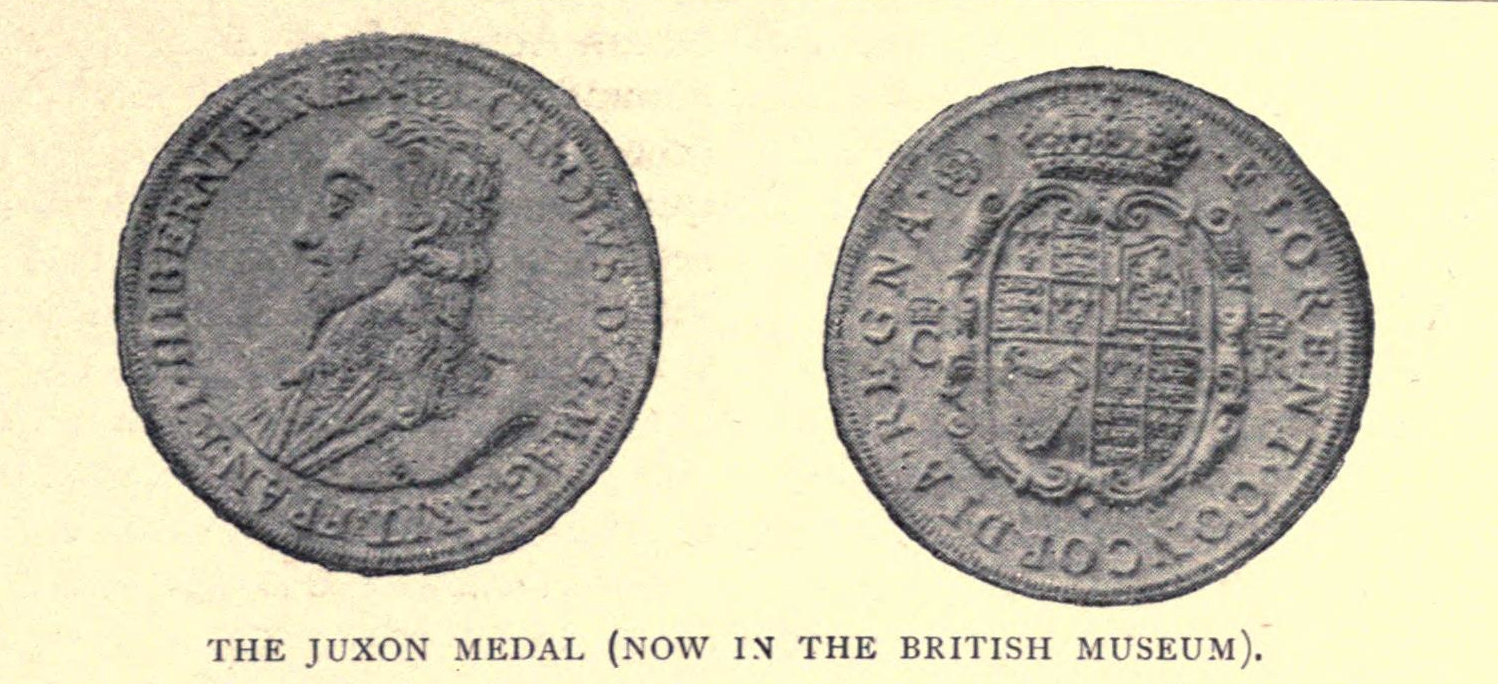
The "Juxon medal"

About 1648 Rawlins seems to have gone to France. He returned to England in 1652, and from that time till the Restoration earned a precarious livelihood, partly by making dies for tradesmen's tokens. He engraved the town-tokens of Bristol, Gloucester, and Oxford, and produced dies for London tradesmen in Broad Street, Hounsditch, St. Paul's Churchyard, and the Wardrobe. On 27 February 1657 he was in prison for debt at the "Hole in St. Martin's", and wrote for assistance to John Evelyn, whom he had met in Paris.

At the Restoration of 1660 Rawlins was reinstated as chief engraver at the mint, Thomas Simon being then styled "Chief Engraver of Arms and Seals". He had a residence in the mint, and in June 1660 was ordered to engrave the king's effigies for the coins. From 30 July to 24 September 1660 he was engaged in engraving a privy seal for Ireland and five judicial seals for the Welsh counties.

Rawlins died in 1670. He was married to Dorothea Narbona. In Richard Flecknoe's Miscellanies there is a poem on Rawlins.

== Medals ==
The following is a list of his principal medals:

- William Wade, 1641.
- Declaration of Parliament, 1642.
- Peace or War, rev. Sword and olive-branch; Forlorn Hope badge; Sir Robert Welch; Bristol taken; Meeting of Charles I and Henrietta Maria at Kineton, 1643.
- Sir William Parkhurst; Badges of Charles I and Henrietta Maria, 1644.
- Sir Robert Heath, 1645.
- Thomas Harper of Alveton Lodge, Staffordshire, 1647.
- Sir Robert Bolles, 1655.
- Coronation Medal, rev. Charles II as a Shepherd ("Dixi custodiam"), 1661.
- Dominion of the Sea, rev. Nos penes imperium, 1665.

He also executed badges with portraits of the royal family, and the medals Death of Charles I, (1) rev. Hammer striking diamond on anvil, 1648; (2) rev. Rock buffeted by Winds; and (3) rev. Salamander amid flames, 1648.

== Works ==
In 1640, Rawlins published The Rebellion, a tragedy that, according to the title-page, was acted nine days together and subsequently by the king's company of revels. The scene is laid in Seville, and a prominent part is taken in the play by the tailors of the city. It was dedicated by Rawlins to his kinsman Robert Ducie of Aston, Staffordshire.

Two comedies, both printed after the year of his death, are usually assigned to Rawlins:

- Tom Essence, or the Modish Life (sometimes attributed to Edward Ravenscroft, a play in debt to Molière's Cocu Imaginaire; it was licensed for performance at Dorset Garden on 4 November 1676, and printed in 1677.
- Tunbridge Wells, or a Day's Courtship, a comedy, printed in 1678.

A collection of poems called Calanthe (with Good Friday, being Meditations on that Day, 1648) is signed "T. R.", and William Oldys identified the author with Rawlins. Complimentary verses by Rawlins are prefixed to Messallina, a tragedy, by his friend Nathanael Richards, and to Richard Lovelace's Lucasta.
