= Nahum Tate =

Anglo-Irish poet and playwright

Poet Laureate of England/Great Britain
- In office 23 December 1692 – 30 July 1715
- Monarchs: William III and Mary II; Anne
- Preceded by: Thomas Shadwell
- Succeeded by: Nicholas Rowe

Personal details
- Born: 1652 Dublin, Ireland
- Died: 30 July 1715 (aged 62–63) Southwark, London, Great Britain
- Resting place: St George the Martyr, Southwark, London
- Parent: Faithful Teate (father)
- Education: Trinity College Dublin
- Occupation: Poet
- Awards: Poet Laureate of the Kingdom of England (1692)

Nahum Tate (/ˈneɪ.əm ˈteɪt/ NAY-əm TAYT; 1652 – 30 July 1715) was an Anglo-Irish poet, hymnist, and lyricist, who became Poet Laureate in 1692. Tate is best known for The History of King Lear, his 1681 adaptation of Shakespeare's King Lear, and for his libretto for Henry Purcell's opera, Dido and Aeneas. He also wrote the lyrics to a Christmas carol, "While shepherds watched their flocks".

== Life ==
Nahum Tate was born in Dublin and came from a family of Puritan clerics. He was the son of Faithful Teate, an Irish cleric whose father, also Faithful, had been rector of Castleterra, Ballyhaise, until his house was burnt and his family attacked during the Irish Rebellion of 1641.

After living at the provost's lodgings in Trinity College Dublin, Faithful Teate moved to England. He was the incumbent at East Greenwich around 1650, and "preacher of the gospel" at Sudbury from 1654 to 1658. He had returned to Dublin by 1660. He published a poem on the Trinity entitled Ter Tria, as well as some sermons, two of which he dedicated to Oliver and Henry Cromwell.

Nahum Teate followed his father to Trinity College Dublin in 1668, and graduated BM in 1672. By 1676, he had moved to London and was writing for a living. The following year, he had adopted the spelling "Tate", which would remain until his death. He died within the precincts of the Mint, Southwark, where he had taken refuge from his creditors, on 30 July 1715 and was buried at St George the Martyr, Southwark on 1 August as "of next to the Prince Eugene, Mint".

== Works ==
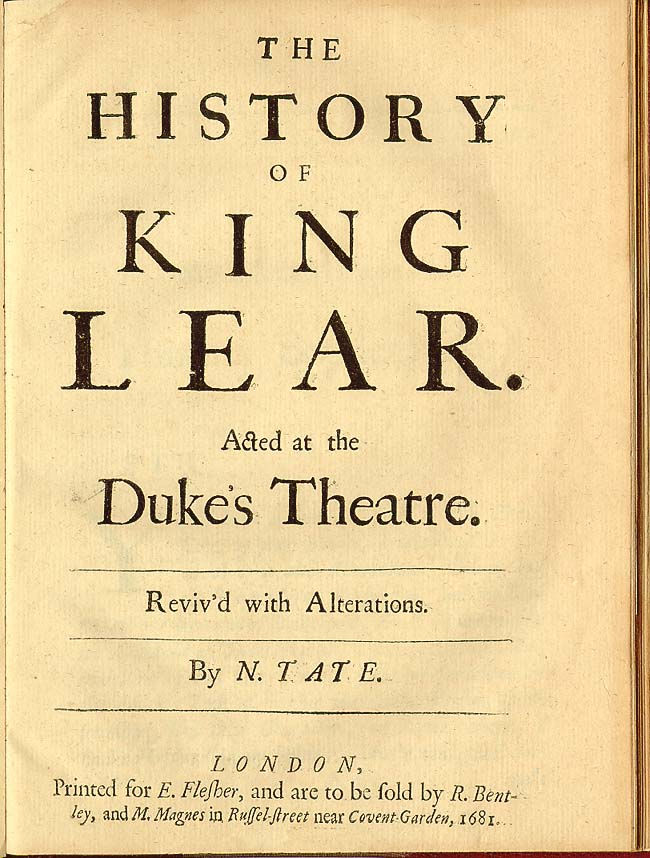
Title page of Tate's version of King Lear

Tate published a volume of poems in London in 1677, and became a regular writer for the stage. Brutus of Alba, or The Enchanted Lovers (1678), a tragedy dealing with Dido and Aeneas, was dedicated to Charles Sackville, 6th Earl of Dorset; it was later adapted as the libretto for Henry Purcell's opera Dido and Aeneas (1688 or earlier). The Loyal General, with a prologue by Dryden, played at the Dorset Garden Theatre in 1680.

Tate then turned to making a series of adaptations of Elizabethan dramas. His version of William Shakespeare's Richard II altered the names of the characters, and changed the text so that every scene, he wrote, was "full of respect to Majesty and the dignity of courts"; in spite of these precautions, though, The Sicilian Usurper (1681), as his adaptation was called, was suppressed on the third performance on account of a possible political interpretation. In 1681, Thomas Betterton played Tate's version of King Lear (The History of King Lear), in which the Fool is omitted. Cordelia has a confidante named Arante, and has her own "abduction" scene on the heath. This version concludes with several happy endings with a presumed marriage between Cordelia and Edgar, for Lear (who regains his throne) and Kent. Although Joseph Addison protested at this mutilation of Shakespeare, Samuel Johnson defended the poetic justice of Tate's adaptation. Coriolanus became The Ingratitude of a Commonwealth, performed at the Theatre Royal, Drury Lane in 1682. Tate's farce A Duke and No Duke (first printed 1685, but acted earlier at the Theatre Royal) imitated Sir Aston Cockayne's Trappolin suppos'd a Prince. His Cuckold's Haven (performed 1685 at the Theatre Royal) was derived from Chapman and John Marston's Eastward Ho. The Island Princess, or the Generous Portugals (1687) was adapted from John Fletcher. Injur'd Love, or the Cruel Husband (1707), altered from John Webster's The White Devil, seems never to have been acted.

In 1682, Tate collaborated with John Dryden to complete the second half of his epic poem Absalom and Achitophel.

Tate wrote the libretto for Henry Purcell's opera Dido and Aeneas; its first known performance was in 1689. He also wrote the text for Purcell's Birthday Ode Come Ye Sons of Art in 1694. Tate also translated Syphilis sive Morbus Gallicus, Girolamo Fracastoro's Latin pastoral poem on the subject of the disease of syphilis, into English heroic couplets.

Tate's name is connected with New Version of the Psalms of David (1696), for which he collaborated with Nicholas Brady. Some items such as "As pants the hart" (Psalm 42) rise above the general level, and are said to be Tate's work. A supplement was licensed in 1703 that included the Christmas carol "While shepherds watched their flocks", one of a number of hymns by Tate.

Of his numerous poems, the most original is Panacea, a poem on Tea (1700). In spite of his consistent Toryism, he succeeded Thomas Shadwell as poet laureate in 1692. His poems were sharply criticised by Alexander Pope in The Dunciad.

== Modern stagings of Tate's work ==
In 1985, the Riverside Shakespeare Company of New York City staged Tate's History of King Lear, directed by W. Stuart McDowell at The Shakespeare Center. Musical interludes were sung by cast members during the act breaks, accompanied by a harpsichord in the orchestra pit. In the summer of 2021, the Tate version of King Lear was performed by the NY Classical Theatre in four New York City outdoor locations.

== Notes ==
Court offices
Preceded by Thomas Shadwell	British Poet Laureate; 1692–1715	Succeeded by Nicholas Rowe
