= Henry Norris (actor) =

English actor

- Born: 1665; London
- Died: 1730?
- Occupation: Actor

Henry Norris (1665–1730?), also known as "Jubilee Dicky", was an English actor.

== Biography ==
Norris was the son of Norris, an actor, who joined Sir William D'Avenant's company, known as the king's servants, and was the original Lovis in Etherege's ‘Comical Revenge, or Love in a Tub,’ licensed 1664. Henry's mother, Mrs. Norris, said by Davies to have been the first English actress on the stage, was the original Lady Dupe in ‘Sir Martin Marrall, or Feigned Innocence,’ a translation of ‘L'Étourdi’ of Molière by the Duke of Newcastle and Dryden. The son was born in 1665 in Salisbury Court, near the spot on which the Dorset Garden Theatre subsequently stood. In 1695, he was engaged by Ashbury to play in Dublin at Smock Alley Theatre comic parts such as were taken in London by Nokes. This justifies the assumption that he must have had previous experience, but his name is not previously traceable in London. In Dublin, he played about 1695 (Hitchcock) Sir Nicholas Cully in Etherege's ‘Comical Revenge,’ Sir Oliver Cockwood in his ‘She would if she could,’ and Handy in his ‘Man of Mode, or Sir Fopling Flutter.’

In the latter part of 1699 he was in London, and played at Drury Lane Dicky in Farquhar's ‘Constant Couple, or a Trip to the Jubilee.’ His success in this was so remarkable that the name Jubilee Dicky stuck to him, and was often inserted in the playbills in place of his own. Next year he was the Mad Welchman in a revival of the ‘Pilgrim,’ and was the original Pizalto in the ‘Perjured Husband’ of Mrs. Carroll (Centlivre), and on 9 July the first Sir Anthony Addle in Crauford's ‘Courtship à la Mode.’ In Cibber's ‘Love makes a Man,’ 1701, he was the first Sancho, and he resumed his part of Dicky in ‘Sir Harry Wildair,’ Farquhar's sequel to his ‘Trip to the Jubilee.’ Sir Oliver Oldgame in D'Urfey's ‘Bath, or the Western Lass,’ Petit in Farquhar's ‘Inconstant, or the Way to win him,’ and Mrs. Fardingale in Steele's ‘Funeral, or Grief à la Mode,’ belong to 1702; and Symons in Estcourt's ‘Fair Example,’ Martin in Mrs. Carroll's ‘Love's Contrivance,’ and Ralph in Wilkinson's ‘Vice Reclaimed’ to 1703. He probably went with the company to Bath in the summer. On 26 January 1704 he was the Priest in ‘Love the Leveller.’ He played on 16 February 1705 Duenna in Dennis's ‘Gibraltar,’ and on 18 March Sir Patient Careful in Swiney's ‘Quacks,’ also 23 April Tipkin in Steele's ‘Tender Husband, or the Accomplished Fools.’ He was, moreover, Prigg in an adaptation from Beaumont and Fletcher called ‘The Royal Merchant, or the Beggars' Bush.’ In 1706 Norris was Trustwell in the ‘Fashionable Lover,’ and on 8 April the first Costar Pearmain in Farquhar's ‘Recruiting Officer.’ With a detachment of Drury Lane actors, he accompanied Swiney to the Haymarket, where on 13 November 1706 he performed Gomez in a revival of Dryden's ‘Spanish Friar.’ Here he played a round of comic characters, including Sir Politick Wouldbe in ‘Volpone,’ Testimony in ‘Sir Courtly Nice,’ Cutbeard in the ‘Silent Woman,’ Moneytrap in the ‘Confederacy,’ and many others, and was the original Equipage in Mrs. Carroll's ‘Platonick Lady’ on 25 November 1706, and Scrub on 8 March 1707 in Farquhar's ‘Beaux' Stratagem.’ The following season he added to his repertory Snap in Cibber's ‘Love's Last Shift,’ Bookseller in the ‘Committee,’ Calianax in the ‘Maid's Tragedy,’ the first witch in ‘Macbeth,’ Justice Clack in Brome's ‘Jovial Crew,’ and was, 1 November 1707, the original Sir Squabble Splithair in Cibber's ‘Double Gallant.’ At Drury Lane or the Haymarket he played, among many other characters, Learchus in ‘Æsop,’ Dapper in the ‘Alchemist,’ Sir Francis Gripe, Obediah, Foresight, Nurse in ‘Caius Marius,’ Otway's rendering of ‘Romeo and Juliet,’ Old Woman in ‘Rule a Wife and have a Wife,’ Setter in the ‘Old Bachelor,’ Sir Jasper Fidget in the ‘Country Wife,’ Gripe in ‘Love in a Wood,’ Fondlewife, and Pistol in the second part of ‘King Henry IV.’ His original parts include Roger in Taverner's ‘Maid's the Mistress,’ 5 June 1708; Shrimp in D'Urfey's ‘Fine Lady's Airs,’ 14 December 1708; and Squire Crump in D'Urfey's ‘Modern Prophets,’ 3 May 1709. In the summer of 1710 he played at Greenwich. Lorenzo, in Mrs. Centlivre's ‘Marplot,’ Drury Lane, 30 December 1710, was an original part, as were Flyblow in Charles Johnson's ‘Generous Husband,’ 20 January 1711; Spitfire in the ‘Wife's Relief,’ an alteration by Johnson of Shirley's ‘Gamester,’ 12 November 1711; Chicane in Johnson's ‘Successful Pirate,’ 7 November 1712; Sir Feeble Dotard in Taverner's ‘Female Advocates,’ 6 January 1713; First Trull in Charles Shadwell's ‘Humours of the Army,’ 29 January 1713; Sir Tristram Gettall in ‘Apparition,’ 25 November 1713; Don Lopez in Mrs. Centlivre's ‘Wonder,’ 27 April 1714; Tim Shacklefigure in Johnson's ‘Country Lasses,’ 4 February 1715; Peter Nettle in Gay's ‘What d'ye call it?’ 23 February 1715; Gardiner in Addison's ‘Drummer,’ 10 March 1716; Dr. Possum in ‘Three Hours after Marriage,’ assigned to Gay, Pope, and Arbuthnot, 16 January 1717; Buskin in Breval's ‘The Play is the Plot,’ 19 February 1718; Whisper in Charles Johnson's ‘Masquerade,’ 16 January 1719; Henry in Smythe's ‘Rival Modes,’ 27 December 1726; First Shepherd in the ‘Double Falsehood,’ attributed by Theobald to Shakespeare, 13 December 1727; and Timothy in Miller's ‘Humours of Oxford,’ 9 January 1730. He probably died before the end of the year.

Norris was one of the actors who were seen at Bartholomew Fair. Addison, in the ‘Spectator,’ No. 44, says that Bullock in a short coat and Norris in a long one ‘seldom fail’ to raise a laugh (cf. Henry Morley, Bartholomew Fair, p. 282). Norris indeed had a little formal figure which looked droll in a long coat, and a thin squeaking voice that raised a smile when heard in private. According to Chetwood he spoke tragedy with propriety, but seldom assumed any important part, for which his stature disqualified him. He acted Cato, however, gravely to Pinkethman's Juba at Pinkethman's theatre at Richmond, and in 1710 played at Greenwich the Dervise in ‘Tamerlane.’ Victor declared him the best Gomez in the ‘Spanish Friar’ and Sir Jasper Fidget in the ‘Country Wife’ that he ever saw. When Cibber played Barnaby Brittle in the ‘Wanton Wife,’ he was commended. Mrs. Oldfield, however, announced her preference for Norris, who seemed predestined to wear the horns. Davies speaks of him as an excellent comic genius, and says that his delivery of the two lines assigned him in the rehearsal in which he played Heigh ho! caused him to be called sometimes in the bills by that name as well as Jubilee Dicky. He was also spoken of as Nurse Norris.

Norris married about 1705 Mrs. Knapton, an actress, a sister of the first Mrs. Wilks. Her name appears occasionally in the bills. She was a fine and personable woman, a great contrast to her husband, whose stature was diminutive. By her Norris had issue. The marriage was announced on 28 January 1731 of ‘Mr. Henry Norris of Drury Lane’ and Mrs. Jenny Wilks, daughter of Mrs. Wilks of the same house. This was probably the son of Norris who on 15 November 1731 at Goodman's Fields, as Norris from Dublin, ‘son of the late famous comedian of that name,’ played Gomez in the ‘Spanish Friar.’ A second son of Norris was on the country stage. Neither, however, had anything in common with the father but diminutive stature. No portrait of Norris can be traced.
