= Thomas Jevon =

English playwright (1652–1688)

Thomas Jevon (1652–1688) was an English playwright, and one of the first English Harlequins. He began his career as a dancing master, but worked his way onto the stage, and played leading low-comedy parts in London between 1673 and 1688. His brother-in-law was the English playwright and poet laureate Thomas Shadwell.

Jevon's only published play, the farce The Devil of a Wife, or, a Comical Transformation (with a plot borrowed from a Philip Sidney story, and possibly some assistance from Shadwell), was performed in 1686 at Dorset Garden, where Jevon usually acted. Jevon and George Powell played the two leading male roles, and the piece achieved great success. Various versions with added music appeared later, and Charles Coffey used it as the basis of his opera The Devil to Pay in 1731.
