= Thomas Betterton =

17th-century English actor

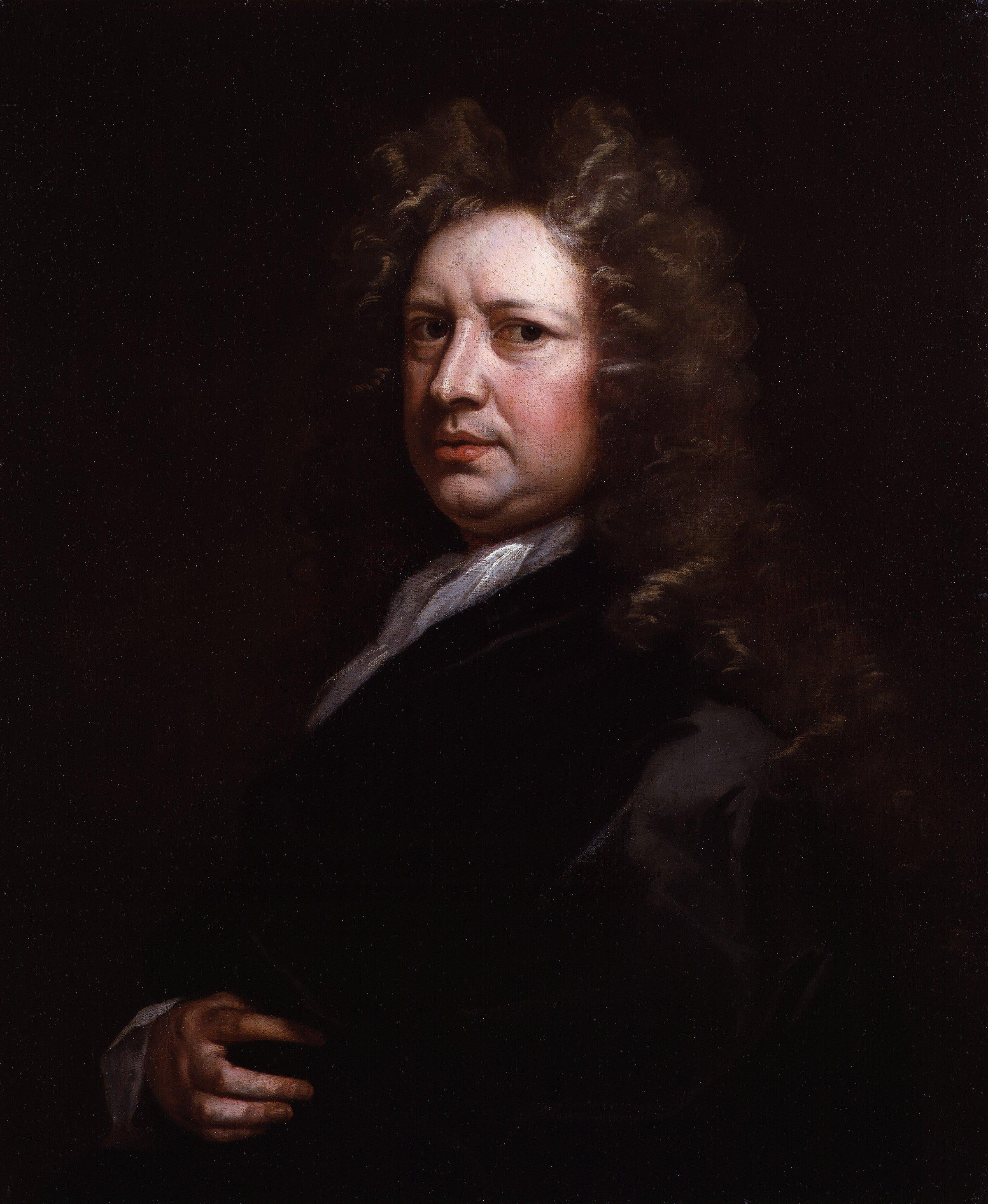
Thomas Betterton painted by Sir Godfrey Kneller

Thomas Betterton (August 1635 – 28 April 1710) was the leading male actor and theatre manager during Restoration England. He was the son of an under-cook to King Charles I and was born in London.

== Apprentice and actor ==
Betterton was born in August 1635 in Tothill Street, Westminster. He was apprenticed to John Holden, Sir William Davenant's publisher, and possibly later to a bookseller named John Rhodes, who had been wardrobe-keeper at the Blackfriars Theatre. In 1659, Rhodes obtained a license to set up a company of players at the Cockpit Theatre in Drury Lane; and on the reopening of this theatre in 1660, Betterton made his first appearance on the stage.

Betterton's talents at once brought him into prominence, and he was given leading parts. On the opening of the new theatre in Lincoln's Inn Fields in 1661, Davenant, the patentee of the Duke's Company, engaged Betterton and all Rhodes's company to play in his The Siege of Rhodes. Also in 1661 he played Prince Alvaro in Davenant's Love and Honour. Betterton, besides being a public favourite, was held in high esteem by Charles II, who sent him to Paris to examine stage improvements there. According to Cibber, after his return to England, it was the first time that the shifting scenes replaced tapestry in an English theatre.

In 1662 he married the actress Mary Saunderson (died 1712). She started her professional career playing some major female roles in Shakespeare's plays. She and her husband Thomas Betterton shared the stage in a production of Hamlet, in which she played Ophelia, opposite to Betterton's Hamlet.They also played Bosola and The Duchess in Webster's The Duchess of Malfi in the early 1660s. In the meantime, she was also her husband's consultant and business partner. In an age when the profession of acting was often thought as notorious and indecent, and actors, both male and female were unfairly criticized as whores, the Bettertons were still regarded as respectable. They were invited to teach the children from noble and royal families to perform John Crowne's Calisto, 1675, in the last Stuart court Masque.

In appearance he was athletic, slightly above middle height, with a tendency to stoutness; his voice was strong rather than melodious, but in recitation it was used with the greatest dexterity. Pepys, Pope, Steele, and Cibber all bestow lavish praise on his acting. His repertory included a large number of Shakespearian roles, many of them presented in the versions adapted by Davenant, Dryden, Shadwell and Nahum Tate. Even though those adapted versions did not receive critical acclaim, they did not harm or shadow Betterton's acting either. Still, his performances were largely praised. Gary Taylor credits Betterton's performance in Pericles, Prince of Tyre for the addition of Shakespeare's play to the theatrical repertoire in the mid-seventeenth century. He played Lear opposite Elizabeth Barry's Cordelia in Tate's modified version of Shakespeare's King Lear. Betterton was himself author of several adaptations which were popular in their day.His love of Shakespearean tragedy led him to visit Warwickshire in search of Shakespeare's descendants. The results of his enquiries are the basis of the first published biography of Shakespeare which is the work of Nicholas Rowe.

== Actor and manager ==
From Davenant's death in 1668, Betterton was the de facto manager and director of the Duke's Company, and from the merger of London's two theatre companies in 1682, he continued to fulfill these functions in the new United Company. Enduring progressively worse conditions and terms in this money-grubbing monopoly (see Restoration spectacular and Restoration comedy), the top actors walked out in 1695 and set up a cooperative company in Lincoln's Inn Fields under Betterton's leadership. The new company opened with the premiere of Congreve's Love for Love with an all-star cast including Betterton as Valentine and Anne Bracegirdle as Angelica. But in a few years the profits fell off; and Betterton, laboring under the infirmities of age and gout, determined to quit the stage. At his benefit performance, when the profits are said to have been over £500, he played Valentine in Love for Love.

Betterton's career not only spans the period of Restoration theatre, it also marks its high point. There was a period of time when the size of theatre audience started to reduce, in order to revive people's interest in theatre, he invented new stage machines at Dorset Garden Theatre, transposed The Prophetess into an opera, and introduced French singers and dancers to the Restoration stage. He also built the first permanent theatre fully equipped with Italianate machinery. Additionally, he invested in remodeling the tennis court in the Lincoln's Inn Fields and built a new theatre there, therefore in addition to his salary, he also received a small amount of "rent" fees for each performance done there. Betterton worked with all of the most significant playwrights of his age and the first generation of English actresses. During his time, with the exception of William Mountfort, who gained a versatility in terms of portraying roles, most of Betterton's contemporary actors deliberately restricted themselves to certain popular character-types. However Betterton had more than 120 different roles from the genres such as heroic drama, Jonsonian comedy, comedies of manners, tragicomedies by Beaumont and Fletcher, and tragedies, comedies and histories by Shakespeare. At the age of seventy-five, he claimed, "He was yet learning to be an actor." The first acting guide published in English was The Life of Mr Thomas Betterton, which was mainly a pastiche from French rhetoric manuals with passages borrowed from English plays.

Betterson's innovation in scenery and theatre management, and his contributions to theatre making shaped the culture of English theatre.

Betterton performed to within fifteen days of his death. Three days before his death at seventy-five, he made his last appearance on the stage in 1710, as Melantius in The Maid's Tragedy. He died shortly afterwards, and was buried in Westminster Abbey. From his debut as an actor in 1659 to his last appearance in 1710, his fifty-year career stretched nearly to the end of Stuart Dynasty. Thomas Betterton's death marks the end of a generation.

== In popular culture ==
Betterton is portrayed by Tom Wilkinson in the 2004 film Stage Beauty. Wilkinson was in his mid 50s at the time, yet the film is set around 1662, when Betterton would have been younger than 30.

== Selected roles ==
- Prince Alvaro in Love and Honour (1661)
- Hamlet (1661)
- Welford in Squire Oldsapp (1678)
- King Lear in Nahum Tate's King Lear (1681)
- Jaffeir in Venice Preserv’d (1682)
- Valentine in Love for Love (1695)
- Tamerlane by Nicholas Rowe (1701)
- Melantius in The Maid's Tragedy (1710)
