= Anthony Leigh =

English actor

Anthony Leigh (died 1692) was an English comic actor.

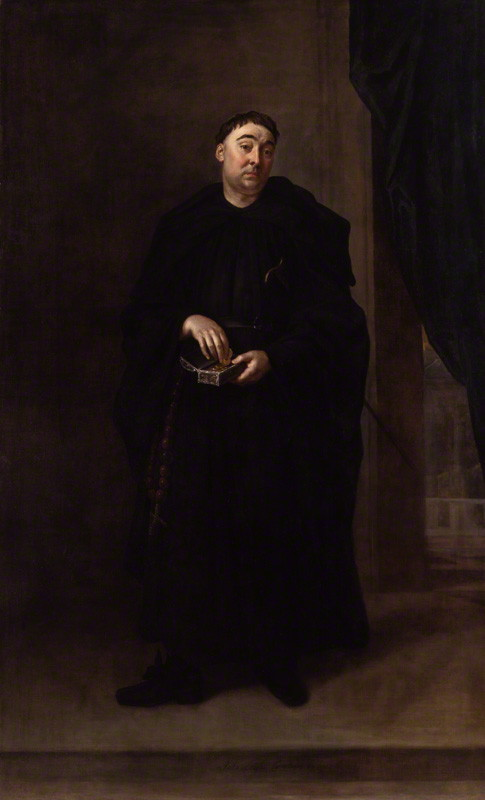
Anthony Leigh as the "Spanish Fryar" in John Dryden's play, 1689 portrait by Godfrey Kneller commissioned by Charles Sackville, 6th Earl of Dorset

== Life ==
He was from a Northamptonshire family, and was not closely related to the actor John Leigh (c.1689–1726?). He joined the Duke of York's company about 1672, and appeared in that year at the recently opened theatre in Dorset Garden, as the original Pacheco in The Reformation (1673), a comedy ascribed by Gerard Langbaine to one Arrowsmith, a Cambridge M.A. graduate. At Dorset Garden, Leigh played many original parts. After the merger of the duke's company with the king's in 1682, Leigh did not immediately go to the Theatre Royal. He was in 1683, however, at that theatre the original Bartoline in John Crowne's City Politics, and played Bessus in a revival of A King and No King. Here he remained until his death, creating many characters. Leigh died of fever in December 1692, in the same season as James Nokes, and these deaths, combined with the murder of William Mountfort, greatly weakened the company.

== Reputation ==
Richard Estcourt used to imitate Leigh's "Spanish Fryar" in the play by Dryden. Coligni in The Villain by Thomas Porter, Ralph in Sir Solomon by John Caryll, Sir Jolly Jumble in Otway's Soldier's Fortune and Belfond in Thomas Shadwell's Squire of Alsatia were thought his best parts. In his Sir William Belfond, said Colley Cibber, Leigh "seemed not to court, but to attack, your applause, and always came off victorious".

== Family ==
Leigh's wife was an actress, named Elinor Leigh, tentatively identified as Elinor Dixon. She acted as Mrs. Leigh to the season of 1706-7. There is a possibility of confusion with the actress Mrs. Lee (Mary Lee, later Mary Slingsby), given that spelling was not fixed at the time. They had eight children baptised at St Bride's Church. Francis Leigh, one of the sons, was on the stage to 1719. He was one of the actors who on 14 June 1710 defied the authority of Aaron Hill, the manager for William Collier, broke open the doors of Drury Lane, and created a riot. He was also one of the actors who deserted to John Rich and his new-built theatre in Lincoln's Inn Fields in 1714.

== Notes ==
Attribution

This article incorporates text from a publication now in the public domain: Lee, Sidney, ed. (1892). "Leigh, Anthony". Dictionary of National Biography. Vol. 32. London: Smith, Elder & Co.
