= Dorset Garden Theatre =

Historic London theatre

Coordinates: 51°30′51″N 0°6′29″W

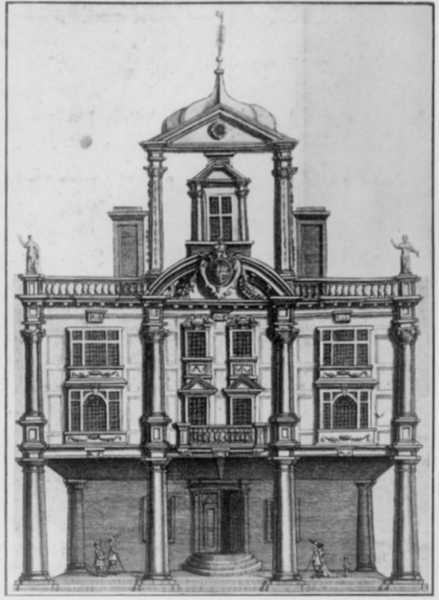
South façade of the Dorset Garden Theatre, as it was pictured in the libretto of The Empress of Morocco (1673). With Hollar’s rendering of the exterior, published in 1681/82, it is the only primary source as to what the exterior looked like. Several other pictures exist (see below), but as they are from the early nineteenth century, more than a hundred years after the theatre had been demolished, they cannot be considered to be reliable sources.

The Dorset Garden Theatre in London, built in 1671, was in its early years also known as the Duke of York's Theatre, or the Duke's Theatre. In 1685, King Charles II died and his brother, the Duke of York, was crowned as James II. When the Duke became King, the theatre became the Queen's Theatre in 1685, referring to James' second wife, Mary of Modena. The name remained when William III and Mary II came to the throne in 1689.

It was the fourth home of the Duke's Company, one of the two patent theatre companies in Restoration London, and after 1682 continued to be used by the company's successor, the United Company.

It was demolished in 1709.

== Background ==
After years of being banned during the Interregnum, theatre performances were again permitted on the Restoration of Charles II with the grant of Letters Patent to two companies to perform "legitimate drama" in London. The Duke's Company was patronised by the Duke of York (later James II); the other patent theatre company, the King's Company enjoyed the patronage of his brother, Charles II. Both companies were briefly based, from 1660, in an old Jacobean theatre, the Cockpit Theatre (also known as the Phoenix Theatre) in Drury Lane. After a short period in the Salisbury Court Theatre, the Duke's Company moved in 1662 to Lincoln's Inn Fields, to a building on Portugal Street that was formerly Lisle's Tennis Court. The company remained there until 1671. Meanwhile, the King's Company moved to the Theatre Royal, Drury Lane, where they stayed.

The founder of the Duke's Company (and Poet Laureate) Sir William Davenant, was a proponent of changeable scenery and theatrical machinery, which he is credited with introducing to the English public stage. He died before ground was broken on the new theatre in 1670, and so Dorset Garden was built under the auspices of the Davenant family who was running the Duke's Company with aid of a leading actor of the company, Thomas Betterton. The shareholders agreed to raise the funds, which ultimately amounted to some £9,000. They leased a site in Dorset Garden for a period of 39 years (i.e. until 1709) at an annual rent of £130.55. Just before the opening of the Dorset Garden (probably in the summer of 1671) the leading actor of the Duke's Company, Thomas Betterton, took a trip to France. It is believed that the purpose of this trip was to see the latest in French scenic technology to import it to the English stage. This assumption is largely based on the fact that Betterton, serving as William Davenant's deputy, had gone to France for that purpose at the behest of Charles II in 1661 and would go again in 1683 on the king's behalf to bring back an opera and a troupe of dancers for the court's entertainment. After Betterton's return to England in 1671 the Dorset Garden produced a number of increasingly elaborate spectacles, including operatic adaptations of William Shakespeare's Macbeth (1673) and The Tempest (1674), and Thomas Shadwell's Psyche (1675). Characterizing these Restoration spectaculars was the use of changeable perspective scenery; theatrical machinery for moving scenery and flying actors and objects, instrumental and vocal music, dancing, and large casts.)

== The building ==
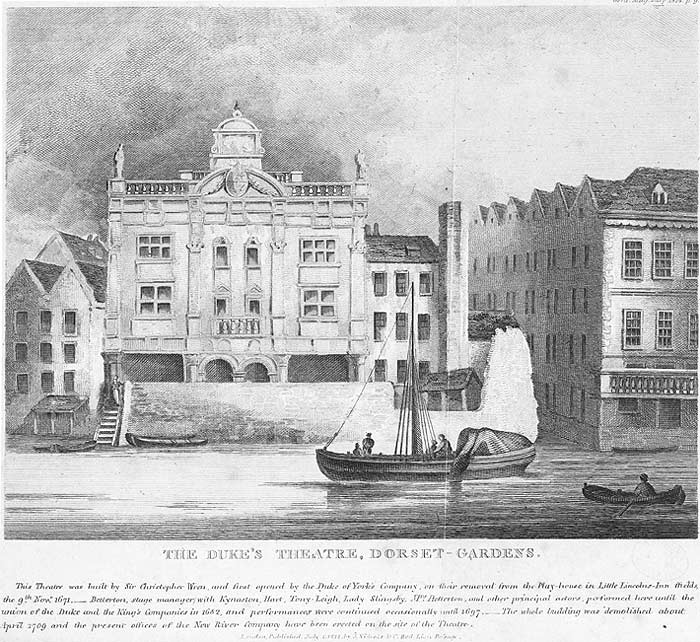
The Duke's Theatre at Dorset Garden: a 19th-century artist's impression

The theatre was built in the former grounds of Dorset House, London seat of the Sackville Earls of Dorset, which was destroyed in the Great Fire of London and was soon densely built over with speculative tenements. Part of the site had been used as a theatre in the time of Charles I: in 1629, Edward Sackville, 4th Earl of Dorset leased the "stables and out howses towards the water side" behind Dorset House... to make a playhouse for the children of the revels." The site for the new theatre, by Dorset Stairs in Whitefriars on the Thames, was slightly upstream from the outlet of the New Canal, part of the Fleet River. Its position on the Thames permitted the patrons to travel to the theatre by boat, avoiding the nearby crime-ridden neighbourhood of Alsatia.

It opened on 9 November 1671 and was almost twice the size of the Duke's Company's former theatre in Lincoln's Inn Fields. It became the principal playhouse in London when the Theatre Royal burned down in January 1672, soon to be rivalled however by the new Theatre Royal, which opened in March 1674. After the Duke's Company merged with the King's Company in 1682 to form the United Company, the theatre in Dorset Garden was used mainly for opera, music, and spectaculars, and from the 1690s it was also used for other entertainments, such as weight lifting, until it was demolished in 1709.

Apart from the illustrations in the libretto of The Empress of Morocco, no contemporary pictures of the interior are known. The rivalry between the two companies led to descriptions of the Dorset Garden theatre in prologues and other verse of the period, thus providing us with some evidence as to what the theatre was actually like.

Thomas Betterton lived in an apartment on an upper floor on the south side. A number of eminent people lived nearby: Aphra Behn in Dorset Street; John Dryden in Salisbury Square from 1673 to 1682; and John Locke in Dorset Court in 1690.

It is not known who designed the new theatre building, though tradition ascribes it to Sir Christopher Wren. This however seems unlikely on both practical and stylistic grounds. Perhaps Robert Hooke, an associate of Wren's had something to do with the design. The outside measurements were 147–148' by 57', including a 10' deep porch. A foreign visitor reported in 1676 that it contained a central "pit", in the form of an amphitheatre, two tiers of seven boxes each holding twenty people, and an upper gallery. It could accommodate approximately 850 patrons. The theatre represented a great investment to the Duke's Company. The interior was richly decorated: the proscenium arch had carvings by Grinling Gibbons.

== The stage ==
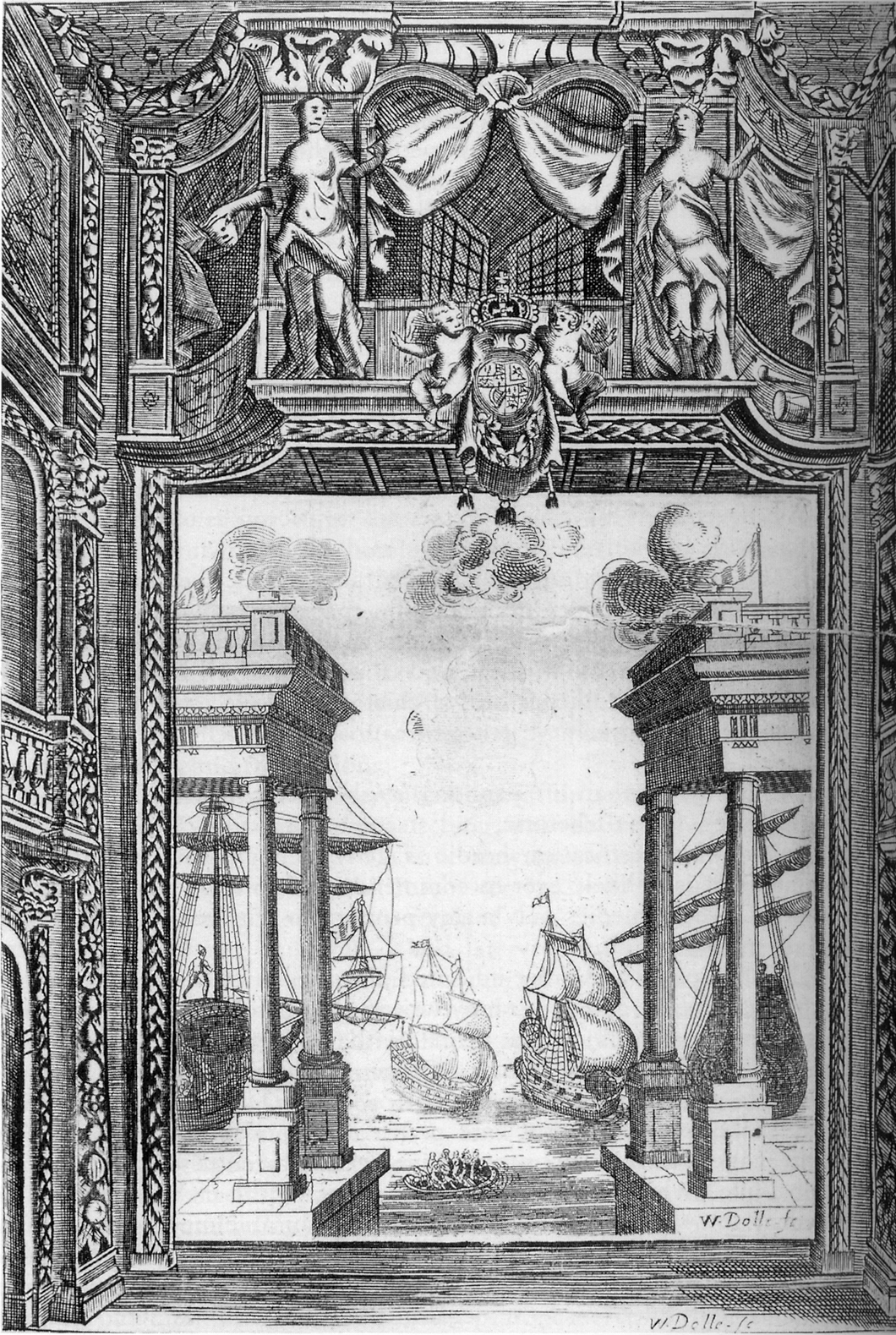
Inside the Dorset Garden Theatre: part of the forestage with doors and balconies on both sides, the proscenium arch with the music box above it and one of the scenes for Elkanah Settle's The Empress of Morocco, performed in 1673. Settle's play included numerous spectacular stage effects.

The Dorset Garden theatre had a large forestage, a typically English feature. Edward Langhans in his reconstruction calculated the forestage to be 19 feet 6 inches (5.94 m) deep and 30 feet 6 inches (9.30 m) wide at the proscenium arch . The forestage provided actors, singers and dancers with a sizeable downstage, a well-illuminated performance space, free of grooves. When a locale was depicted by the scenery, the forestage was understood to be an extension of that place. It served as a vital link between the audience and the performers, the auditorium and the stage, the playgoers and the play. Primary access to the forestage was by permanent proscenium doors, probably two on each side of the stage. Above the doors were balconies, acting spaces that could also serve for seating.

The scenic stage was probably some 50 feet 0 inches (15.24 m) deep and 30 feet 0 inches (9.14 m) high. The proscenium arch may have been some 30 feet 0 inches (9.14 m) wide and at least 25 feet 0 inches (7.62 m) high to accommodate the scenery in operas such as Dioclesian, The Fairy-Queen, or The World in the Moon. Both the forestage and the scenic stage were raked. The music box above the proscenium arch could hold perhaps 8 to 10 musicians, to provide incidental music. A full orchestra would be sitting in the pit, just in front of the stage.

The Duke's Company had already been using moveable scenery to good effect in their previous playhouses. It was first employed by Davenant at Rutland House, using shutters in grooves, which could be quickly slid open or closed to reveal a new scene, but Dorset Garden was also equipped to fly at least four separate people and large objects like a cloud covering the full width of the stage and carrying a large group of musicians (Psyche 1675). There were also numerous floor traps. It was designed for staging Restoration spectaculars, and was the only playhouse in London capable of all the effects these exuberant spectacles required.
