= 1760 in music =

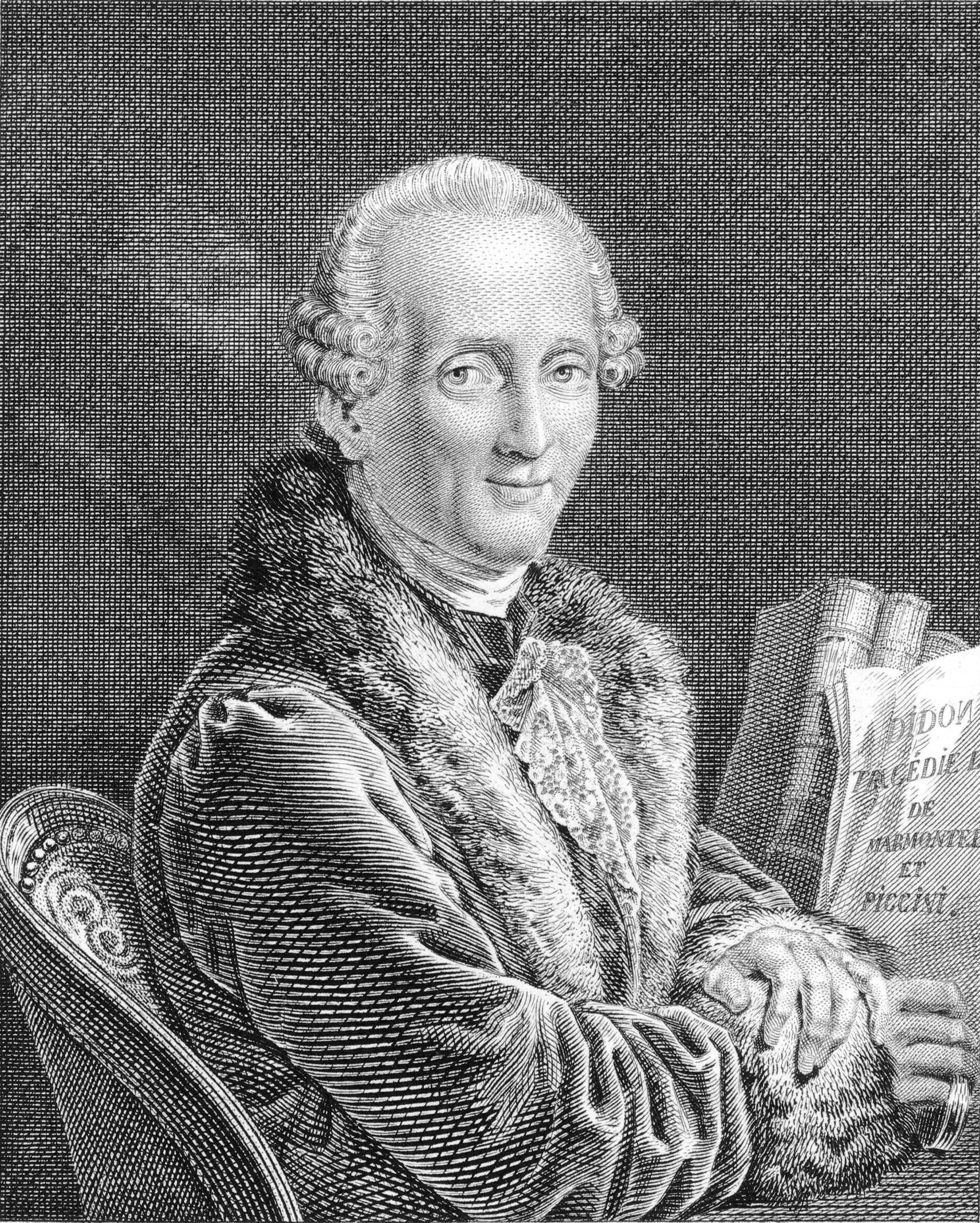
Niccolò Piccinni

== Events ==
- November 26 – Joseph Haydn marries Maria Anna Keller, but he and his wife will live apart for most of their lives.
- John Newton leaves his job for the church, and begins composing hymns.
- Memoirs of the Life of the Late George Frideric Handel, by John Mainwaring, is published anonymously.
- John Alcock is forced to resign as organist and choirmaster of Lichfield Cathedral.
- Johann Christian Bach becomes organist of Milan Cathedral.
- John Garth publishes his Op. 1 cello concertos (written over the previous decade), the first time such compositions have been published in Britain.
- Johann Baptist Wanhal is brought to Vienna to receive lessons from Carl Ditters von Dittersdorf.

== Opera ==
- Thomas Arne – Thomas and Sally
- Johann Christian Bach – Artaserse
- Nicola Porpora - "Il trionfo di Camilla"
- Johann Adolph Hasse – Alcide al Bivio
- Vincenzo Manfredini – Semiramide
- Niccolò Piccinni – La buona figliuola
- Jean-Philippe Rameau – Les Paladins

== Classical music ==
- Johann Albrechtsberger – String Quartet in D
- Carl Philipp Emanuel Bach
  - Fantasia and Fugue in C minor, H.75.5
  - Sechs Sonaten für Clavier mit veränderten Reprisen, Wq.50 (H. 126, 136–140) (published, Berlin; composed 1758–59)
- William Boyce – Eight Symphonies, op. 2 (published, London: John Walsh; composed over the previous 21 years)
- François Joseph Gossec – Grande Messe des Morts
- Joseph Haydn
  - Symphony No.25 in C major, Hob.I:25
  - Partita in B-flat major, Hob.XVI:2
  - Partita in E major, Hob.XVI:13 (attribution in question)
- Michael Haydn – Concerto for Violin in B-flat major
- Pierre Hugard – La Toilette, suites for the pardessus de viole
- Ignacio de Jerusalem – Clarines sonad (misattributed)
- Franz Xaver Richter
  - 6 Harpsichord Trios
  - 6 Symphonies, Op. 2
- Christoph Schaffrath – Duetto for Bassoon and Harpsichord in F minor, CSWV F:18
- Georg Philipp Telemann – Lukas-Passion

== Methods and theory writings ==
- John Alcock, Sr. – The Life of Miss Fanny Brown
- Giorgio Antoniotto – L'arte armonica
- Francesco Geminiani – The Art of Playing the Guitar or Cittra
- John Mainwaring – Memoirs of the Life of the Late George Frederic Handel
- Friedrich Wilhelm Marpurg – Kritische Briefe über die Tonkunst
- Edward Miller – Institutes of Music, or Easy Instructions for the Harpsichord
- Nicolo Pasquali – The Art of Fingering the Harpsichord
- Jean-Philippe Rameau – Code de musique pratique
- Georg Andreas Sorge
  - Anleitung zum Generalbass und zur Composition
  - Compendium Harmonicum
- William Tans'ur – The Psalm-Singer's Jewel

== Births ==
- January 10 – Johan Rudolf Zumsteeg, German composer (died 1802)
- January 19 – Melchor Lopez Jimenez, Spanish composer (died 1822)
- January 30 – Franz Xaver Partsch, Bohemian composer (died 1822)
- February 12 – Jan Ladislav Dussek, composer (died 1812)
- February 15 – Jean-François Le Sueur, French composer (died 1837)
- March 2 – Charlotta Cederström, born Christina Charlotta Mörner af Morlanda, Swedish patron of the arts (died 1832)
- March 27 – Ishmail Spicer, American composer (died 1832)
- April 4 – Juan Manuel Olivares, Venezuelan composer (died 1797)
- May 10 – Claude Joseph Rouget de Lisle, French composer of La Marseillaise (died 1836)
- May 29 – Charlotte Slottsberg, Swedish ballerina (died 1800)
- July 11 – François-Benoît Hoffman, librettist and playwright (died 1828)
- June 12 – Jean-Baptiste Louvet de Couvray, librettist and novelist (died 1797)
- June 14 – Cándido José Ruano, Spanish composer (died 1803)
- July 12 – Giuseppe Foppa, Italian librettist (died 1845)
- September 12 – Gaetano Valeri, Paduan organist and composer (died 1822)
- September 14 – Luigi Cherubini, Italian-born composer (died 1842)
- September 29 – Maria Hester Park, British composer (died 1813)
- October 1 – William Beckford, English novelist, patron of the arts and composer (died 1844)
- November 9 – Henri-Philippe Gérard, Liègeois composer
- November 14 – Johann Evangelist Brandl, composer (died 1837)
- November 30 – Catharine Frydendahl, opera singer (d. 1831)
- December 2 – Joseph Graetz, German composer (died 1826)

== Deaths ==
- January 18 – Claudio Casciolini, Italian composer (born 1697)
- February 14 – François Colin de Blamont, French composer (born 1690)
- February 22 – Anna Magdalena Bach, German singer, second wife and assistant of Johann Sebastian Bach (born 1701)
- March 2 – François Bouvard, French composer (born 1760)
- March 14 – Anton Fils, German composer (born 1733)
- April 12 – Ernst Gottlieb Baron, German lutenist and composer (born 1696)
- April 24 – Michele Mascitti, music editor and violinist (born c. 1664)
- May – Girolamo Abos, Italian composer (born 1715)
- May 10 – Christoph Graupner, German composer (born 1683)
- August 8 – Henry Needler, English music transcriber (born 1685)
- October 24 – Giuseppe Maria Orlandini, Italian composer (born 1676)
- November 5 – Pierre Février, French organist, harpsichordist and composer (born 1696)
- Date unknown – Roque Ceruti, Italian composer (born c. 1683)
