= Jean Pic =

French playwright and librettist

Jean Pic, (17th century – 18th century), was a French playwright and librettist active between 1682 and 1701.

Abbot Pic wrote libretti for Lully, Collasse and Lacoste. In addition to his opera libretti and books on ethics, he wrote a Recueil (nouv.) d’ouvrages de M. de Saint-Évremond, qui n’ont point encore été publiés. He also published le Songe d’Alcibiade, traduit du grec under the name of Prince of Grimberghen, his disciple, Paris, Didot, 1735, in-12.

== Works ==
=== Libretti ===
La Naissance de Vénus (1695).

- 1695: Ballet des saisons représenté par l’Académie royale de musique, music by L. Lulli and Colasse
- 1696: La Naissance de Vénus, opéra en musique représenté par l’Académie royale de musique, music by de Colasse
- 1695: Les Saisons, ballet premiered by the Académie royale de musique in October 1695, revived in theatre in February 1700, reformed following the revival, after several runs, on... 20th day of September 1707, music by L. Lulli and Colasse
- 1697: Aricie, ballet en musique représenté par l’Académie royale de musique, music by Lacoste

=== Ethical works ===
- 1681: Les Devoirs de la vie civile
- 1687: Réflexions chrestiennes sur les misères et sur les foiblesses de l’homme pour tous les jours de l’année
- 1688: Discours sur la bienséance, avec des maximes et des réflexions très importantes et très nécessaires pour réduire cette vertu en usage
- 1690: Maximes et réflexions sur l’éducation de la jeunesse où sont renfermés les devoirs des parents et des précepteurs envers les enfants, avec des maximes et des réflexions particulières sur l’éducation des princes
- 1698: Discours sur le renouvellement des vœux

=== Other ===
- 1702: Suitte du Timandre ou Lettres de Mr. le C** D** avec les réponses
- Timandre instruit par son génie, transl. from Greek, with a letter written to the author by M***

== Sources ==
- Joseph-Marie Quérard, Dictionnaire bibliographique des savants, v.7, Paris, Didot frères, 1835, (p. 132)
