= Semi-opera =

Opera genre

The terms "semi-opera", "dramatic[k] opera" and "English opera" were all applied to Restoration entertainments that combined spoken plays with masque-like episodes employing singing and dancing characters. They usually included machines in the manner of the restoration spectacular. The first examples were the Shakespeare adaptations produced by Thomas Betterton with music by Matthew Locke. After Locke's death, a second flowering produced the semi-operas of Henry Purcell, notably King Arthur and The Fairy-Queen. Semi-opera received a deathblow when the Lord Chamberlain separately licensed plays without music and the new Italian opera.

Semi-operas were performed with singing, speaking and dancing roles. When music was written, it was usually for moments in the play immediately following either love scenes or those concerning the supernatural.

It has been observed that several of Calderón's comedias with music by Juan Hidalgo de Polanco are closer to semi-opera than to the pastoral Zarzuela.

== List of English semi-operas ==
- Macbeth (1673) libretto by William Davenant after Shakespeare's Macbeth; music by Matthew Locke
- The Tempest, or The Enchanted Island (1674) libretto by Thomas Shadwell after John Dryden and William Davenant's adaptation of Shakespeare's The Tempest; music by Matthew Locke, Giovanni Battista Draghi and Pelham Humfrey
- Calisto, or The Chaste Nymph (1675) libretto by John Crowne; music by Nathaniel Staggins
- Psyche (1675) libretto by Thomas Shadwell; music by Matthew Locke
- Circe (1677) libretto by Charles Davenant; music by John Banister
- The Lancashire Witches and Tegue O'Divelly the Irish Priest (1681) libretto by Thomas Shadwell; music by John Eccles
- Albion and Albanius (1685) libretto by John Dryden; music by Louis Grabu
- Dioclesian (1690) libretto by Thomas Betterton after the play The Prophetess, by John Fletcher and Philip Massinger; music by Henry Purcell
- King Arthur (1691) libretto by John Dryden; music by Henry Purcell
- The Fairy Queen (1692) libretto by an anonymous author after Shakespeare's A Midsummer Night's Dream; music by Henry Purcell
- Timon of Athens (1694), music by Henry Purcell
- Macbeth (1695) libretto by William Davenant after Shakespeare's Macbeth; music by John Eccles and Godfrey Finger
- The Indian Queen (1695) libretto adapted version of the play by Sir Robert Howard and John Dryden; music by Henry Purcell, Act V completed by Daniel Purcell
- Brutus of Alba (1696) libretto by George Powell; music by Daniel Purcell
- Cinthia and Endimion, or The Loves of the Deities (1696) libretto by Thomas Durfey; music by Daniel Purcell, Richard Leveridge, Jeremiah Clarke, Henry Purcell and David Underwood
- The World in the Moon (1697) libretto by Elkanah Settle; music by Daniel Purcell, Jeremiah Clarke and Henry Purcell
- Rinaldo and Armida (1698) libretto by John Dennis; music by John Eccles
- The Island Princess (1699) libretto by Peter Motteux, adapted from plays by John Fletcher and Nahum Tate; music by Daniel Purcell, Richard Leveridge and Jeremiah Clarke
- The Grove, or Love's Paradise (1700) libretto by John Oldmixon; music by Daniel Purcell
- The Mad Lover (1700) libretto by Peter Motteux after the play by John Fletcher; music by John Eccles and Daniel Purcell
- Alexander the Great (1701) anonymous libretto after The Rival Queens by Nathaniel Lee; music by Godfrey Finger and Daniel Purcell
- The Virgin Prophetess, or The Fate of Troy (1701) libretto by Elkanah Settle; music by Godfrey Finger
- The British Enchanters, or No Magic Like Love (1706) libretto by George Granville, Lord Lansdowne; music by John Eccles, Bartholomew Issack and William Corbett
- Wonders in the Sun, or The Kingdom of the Birds (1706) libretto by Thomas Durfey; music by John Smith, Samuel Akeroyde, John Eccles, Giovanni Battista Draghi, Lully and Durfey
- The Tempest (1712) libretto adapted by Thomas Shadwell from the Dryden-Davenant version of Shakespeare's play; music possibly by John Weldon (long attributed to Henry Purcell)
