= Indian Queen (disambiguation) =

Indian Queen (1985–2000) was a British thoroughbred racehorse.

Indian Queen or The Indian Queen may also refer to:

- List of Indian monarchs, including queens of India
- Stereotype of Indians in the New York metropolitan area
- The Indian Queen (opera), a largely unfinished semi-opera with music by Henry Purcell
- The Indian Queen (play), by Sir Robert Howard and John Dryden (1664)
- Indian Queen Tavern and Black's Store, a historic hotel and store complex in Charlestown, Maryland, U.S.
- George Washington House (Bladensburg, Maryland), or Indian Queen Tavern
- Metropolitan Hotel (Washington, D.C.), previously the Indian Queen Tavern and Indian Queen Hotel
- "Indian Queen", track on Flashback (Electric Light Orchestra album) (2000)

== See also ==
- Indian Queens (disambiguation)
