= Restoration spectacular =

17th-century elaborately staged machine play

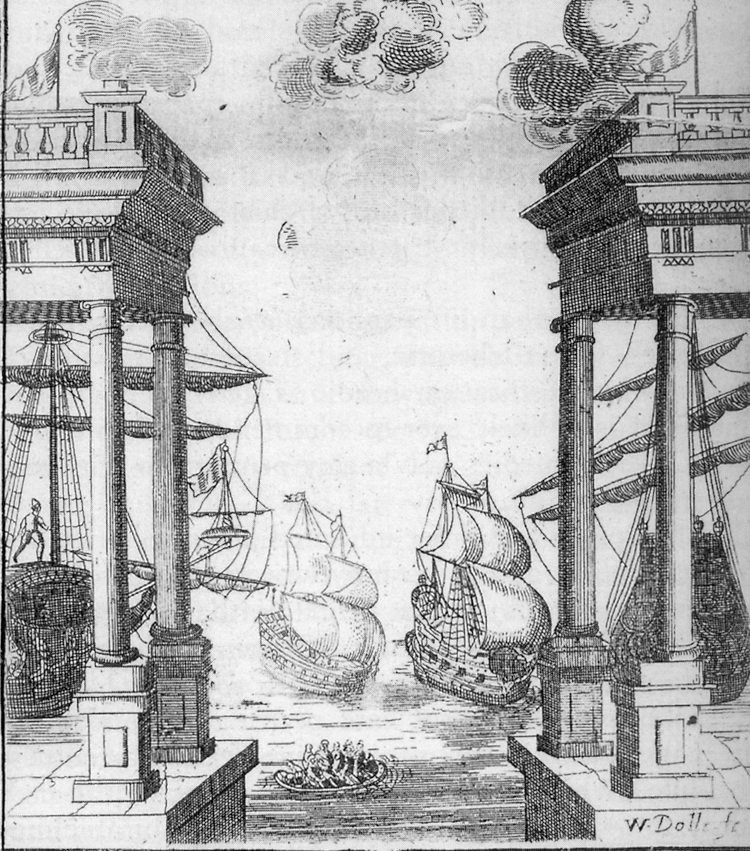
This naval battle was one of the sets for Elkanah Settle's The Empress of Morocco (1673) at the theatre in Dorset Garden.

The Restoration spectacular was a type of theatre production of the late 17th-century Restoration period, defined by the amount of money, time, sets, and performers it required to be produced. Productions attracted audiences with elaborate action, acrobatics, dance, costume, scenery, illusionistic painting, trapdoors, and fireworks. Although they were popular with contemporary audiences, spectaculars have earned a reputation from theatre historians as vulgar in contrast to the witty Restoration drama.

The spectacular has roots in early 17th-century court masque, though it borrowed ideas and technology from French opera. Sometimes called "English opera", spectaculars were so varied as to make theatre historians reluctant to define them as a genre. Spectaculars became increasingly expensive for their theatre companies; a flop could leave a company deeply in debt, while a success could leave a sizeable profit.

== Definition ==
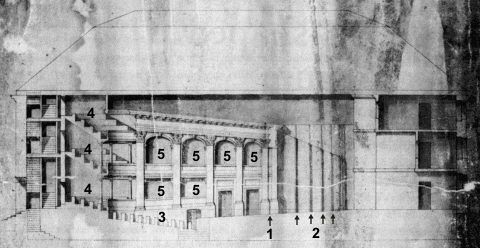
A longitudinal section through a Restoration playhouse drawn by Christopher Wren. It is believed by some scholars only to represent Wren's plan for the second theatre on the Drury Lane site, which opened in 1674 after the original Theatre Royal had burned to the ground in 1672.: 1. Proscenium arch; 2. Four pairs of shutters across the stage (the moveable scenery); 3. Pit; 4. Galleries; 5. Boxes

The distinction between "legitimate" Restoration drama and the Restoration spectacular, "musical spectacular," "Dorset Garden spectacular," or "machine play" is one of degree rather than kind. Many plays of the period featured music, dancing, scenery, and songs. However, the true spectacular, of which Milhous counts only eight over the entire 1660–1700 Restoration period, was produced on a different scale. The spectacular is defined by a large number of sets and performers required, the vast sums of money invested, the potential for great profits, and the long preparation time needed. Milhous calculates that they likely required at least four to six months of planning, contracting, building, and rehearsing, compared to the four to six weeks of rehearsal time a new "legitimate" play required.

== Special effects ==
Previous generations of theatre historians have criticized the operatic spectaculars, such as John Dryden's comments about expensive and tasteless "scenes, machines, and empty operas". However, audiences reportedly enjoyed the performances, as Samuel Pepys' diary shows. Dryden wrote several baroque machine plays himself. The first, The State of Innocence (1677), was never staged, as his designated company, the King's, had neither the capital nor the machinery for it: a dramatization of John Milton's Paradise Lost, it called for "rebellious angels wheeling in the air, and seeming transfixed with thunderbolts" over "a lake of brimstone or rolling fire". The King's Company's Theatre Royal, Drury Lane was unequipped to stage such effects. However, the "machine house" at Dorset Garden was appropriately equipped, though it belonged to the King's Company's competition, the Duke's Company. When the two companies merged in the 1680s and Dryden had access to Dorset Garden, he wrote one of the most visual and special-effects-laden machine plays of the entire Restoration period, Albion and Albanius (1684–85):

The Cave of PROTEUS rises out of the Sea; it consists of several arches of Rock-work adorned with mother-of-pearl, coral, and abundance of shells of various kinds. Through the arches is seen the Sea, and parts of Dover-pier; in the middle of the Cave is PROTEUS asleep on a rock adorned with shells, &c. like the Cave. ALBION and ACACIA seize on him; and while a symphony is playing, he sinks as they are bringing him forward, and changes himself into a Lion, a Crocodile, a Dragon, and then to his own shape again; he comes forward to the front of the stage, and sings."

There is dispute amongst theatre historians as to how such effects, such as crocodiles, were actually produced. There are no extant drawings or descriptions of machinery and sets for the Restoration theatre, although some documentation exists for court masques from the first half of the 17th century, notably the work of Inigo Jones and his pupil John Webb. One reason for the lack of information for the public theatres is that stage effects, and particularly machines, were trade secrets. Inventors of theatrical effects and playhouses took great pains to guard their techniques from their competition.

The exact technology of the plays can only be tenuously inferred from stage directions. Milhous concludes from a review of Dorset Garden performances that "at a conservative estimate" the theatre was equipped to fly at least four people independently and had some very complex floor traps for "transformations" such as that of Proteus. The plates printed in the first edition of Elkanah Settle's The Empress of Morocco are the only extant depictions of actual Restoration stage sets. Pepys' mentions of stage effects in his diary help in visualizing what audiences saw in the 1660s, but the information remains incomplete. There are scarcely any descriptions or reactions preserved from the "golden era" of the machine play in the 1670s–90s, although a general idea of its technology can be gathered from the better-documented French and Italian opera scenery which inspired Thomas Betterton at Dorset Garden Theatre.

== 1625–1660: Court masques and stealth performances ==
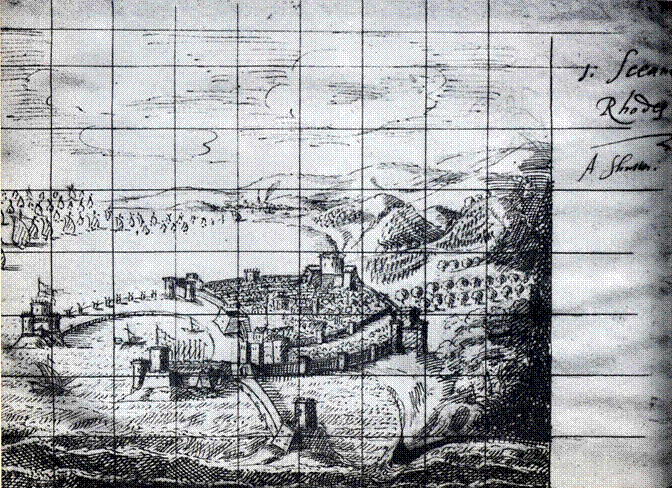
A view of Rhodes, designed by Inigo Jones' pupil John Webb, to be painted on a backdrop for the first performance of Davenant's opera The Siege of Rhodes "in recitative music" in 1656

In the early 17th century, moveable "scenes"—painted wings and backdrops—and technical "machines" or "devices" for flying and other special effects were used in the masques produced for and by the court of Charles I. In William Davenant's Salmacida Spolia (1640), the last of the court masques before the Civil War, Queen Henrietta Maria (who was pregnant at the time) makes her entrance "descending by a theatrical device from a cloud." As early as 1639, Davenant had obtained a royal patent authorizing the construction of a large new public theatre with technology that would allow such effects and accommodate music, scenery, and dancing. Such an invasion of court-drama technique in the public theatre met opposition from "legitimate" dramatists, and war closed down the theatres in 1642.

The public stage ban from 1642 to 1660 imposed by the Puritan regime represented a long and sharp break in dramatic tradition but was never completely successful in suppressing the theatre industry. Performances in grand private houses were not unusual and could have elaborate sets, as can be seen from the extant drawings for the original performance of Davenant's opera The Siege of Rhodes at his home Rutland House. Davenant charged 5 shillings for admission. Some professional actors managed to evade the authorities in stealth acting companies in London, such as that of Michael Mohun at the Red Bull Theatre. By the later 1650s, the restoration of the monarchy was imminent, and playwrights such as William Davenant, began to resume their theatrical activities.

== 1660s: Company competition ==
=== William Davenant, impresario ===
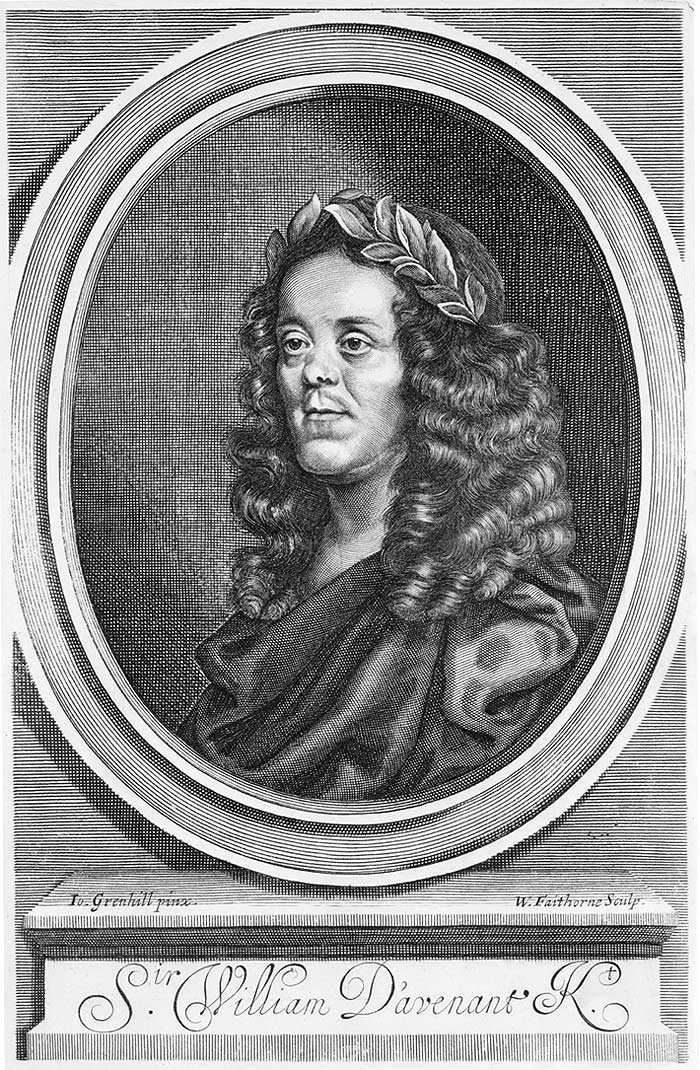
William Davenant brought changeable scenery to the public stage.

When the public performance ban was lifted after the Restoration of the monarchy in 1660, Charles II immediately encouraged the drama and took a personal interest in the scramble for acting licenses and performance rights which followed. Two pre-Commonwealth playwrights, Thomas Killigrew and William Davenant, notable for their loyalty during Charles' exile emerged with a royal Letters Patent for new, or refurbished, patent theatre companies. Killigrew was able to take over Michael Mohun's skilled veteran troupe for his "King's Company" and began with "what was essentially a going concern" (Hume), with the added advantage of the traditional performance rights Mohun brought with him for practically the whole classic repertory of William Shakespeare, Ben Jonson, and the Beaumont and Fletcher team. The competition, Davenant's "Duke's Company", was relegated to a secondary position due to its young, scratched-together troupe and scarcely any performance rights. They were only allowed to put on abridged and modernized versions of Shakespeare plays, and a few that Davenant had written. However, Davenant, "a brilliant impresario", was soon able to turn the tables on Killigrew by realizing his old pre-Civil War dream of music, dance, and spectacular visual effects on the public stage.

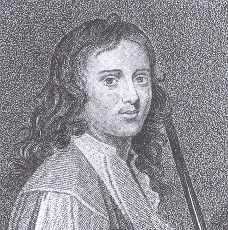
Michael Mohun, "the best actor in the world"

During the autumn of 1660, while the Duke's Company was still seeking financing (mostly by means of the actors buying company shares) and having temporary quarters set up, the King's Company offered a string of well-received productions. Their new theatre in Vere Street was already fully operational. The devoted playgoer Samuel Pepys called it "the finest playhouse... that ever was in England" in his diary, a sentiment he would need to revise many times over the coming decade, and recorded his awe at seeing Michael Mohun, "who is said to be the best actor in the world", act on its stage. Davenant was far behind, but chose to put all his capital into the outfitting of a new superior playhouse in Lincoln's Inn Fields (simultaneously, with great foresight, prying loose the rising young star Thomas Betterton from the King's Company), which was received positively by the public.

=== Changeable scenery ===
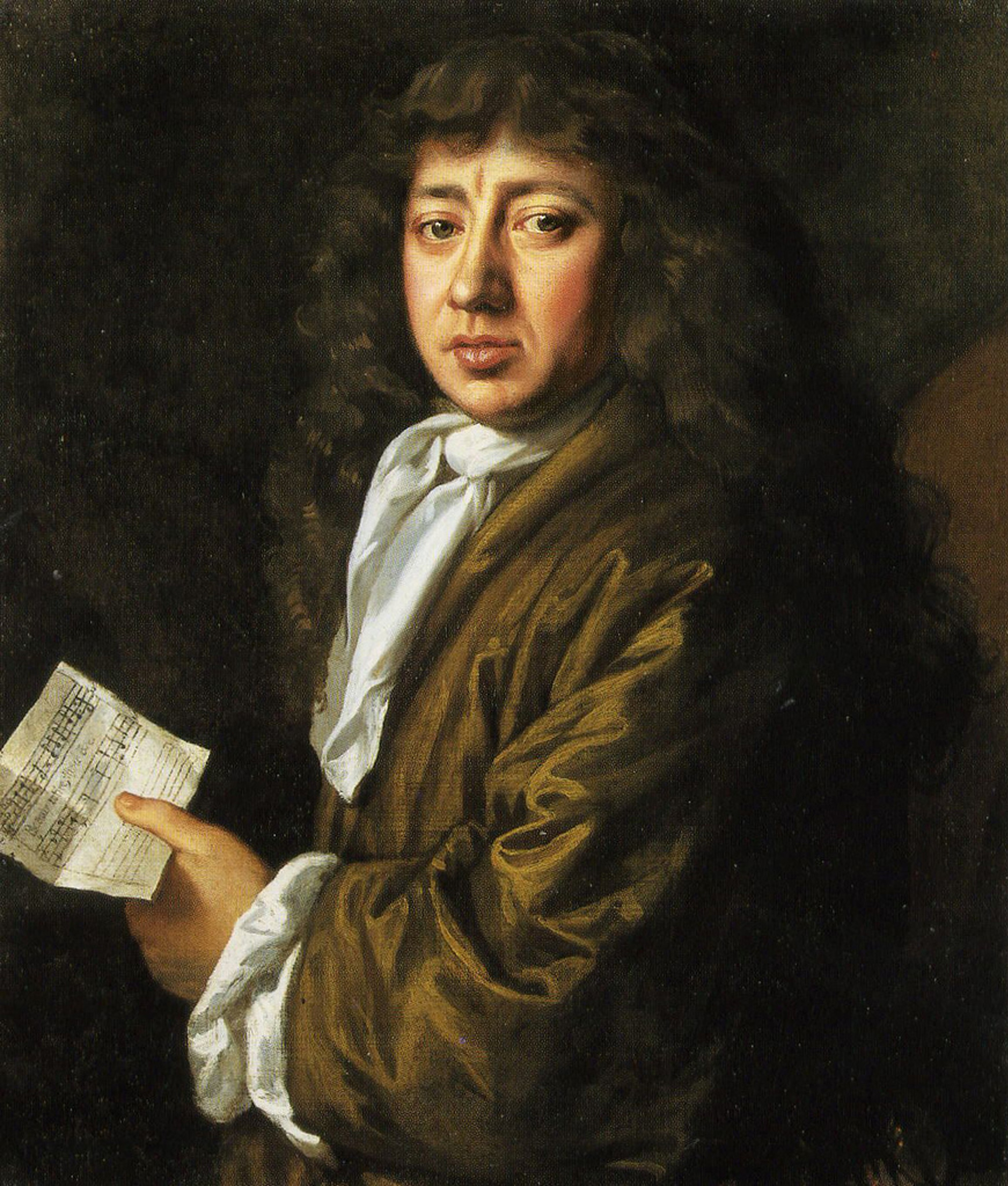
Samuel Pepys recorded the performances of the 1660s in his diary

Lincoln's Inn Fields opened on 28 June 1661, with the first "moveable" or "changeable" scenery used on the British public stage, (i.e., wings or shutters that ran in grooves and could be smoothly and mechanically changed between or even within acts). The production was a revamped version of Davenant's own five-year-old opera The Siege of Rhodes. It is not known who painted the scenes or shutters, or whether continental craftsmen were responsible for the technical construction, but the result was such a sensation that it brought Charles II to a public theatre for the first time. The competing King's Company suddenly found itself playing to empty houses, as Pepys notes on 4 July:

I went to the theatre [in Vere Street] and there I saw Claracilla (the first time I ever saw it), well-acted. But strange to see this house, that used to be so thronged, now empty since the opera begun—and so will continue for a while I believe.

The Siege of Rhodes "continued acting 12 days without interruption with great applause". This was a remarkable run for the limited potential audience of the time. As four more acclaimed Duke's Company productions "with scenes" followed at Lincoln's Inn Fields in the course of 1661 (including Hamlet), all highly admired by Pepys, the King's Company had no other recourse than to hastily commission a changeable-scenery playhouse of their own. Bowing to the inevitable just seven months after the opening of Lincoln's Inn Fields, Killigrew and his actors signed orders for a new, even more magnificent, theatre in Bridges Street. This theatre, the first step in the war of spectacle escalation of the 1660s, was so full when Pepys and his wife went to see an opera there that "they told us we could have no room". The large, yet compact, Restoration playhouses, with audience capacities from 700 to upwards of 2,000, were enormous investments, financed through selling shares in the companies, which were thus bound to make more and more money from ticket sales. Not only the theatres and their technical equipment, but the flats painted for a single performance, the special effects, and the elaborate stage clothes, were extremely expensive. Audiences appreciated both luxury and appropriateness of décor and costume: Pepys was quite capable of going several times to see a play that, as such, he disliked, purely for the pleasure of viewing striking and innovative scenery like "a good scene of a town on fire". The companies struggled to outdo each other in catering to these expensive tastes, with precarious finances and the ever-present consciousness that the investments could literally burn to the ground in a few hours. When the theatre in Bridges Street did burn down in January 1672, with its entire stock of scenery and costumes, it was an economic blow from which the King's Company never recovered.

The Duke's Company, operating smoothly under what soon became Davenant's and Thomas Betterton's joint management, consistently led the way while the King's lagged further and further behind, moving only in forced response and suffering from chronic management conflict between Killigrew and powerful actor shareholders like Michael Mohun and Charles Hart, who insisted on actor-centered "talk" drama. The difference can be traced in Pepys' regular preference for performances at the Duke's, and in his ever-renewed admiration for Betterton's acting. In December 1667, the King's Company even ceased acting for some days because of a quarrel between Mohun and Hart. With the escalation of expenses, days with zero takings were a very serious matter. The crowning grand investment of the Duke's Company was totally beyond the King's means to respond to: the "machine house" at Dorset Garden.

== 1670s: Machine theatre ==
=== Dorset Garden Theatre ===
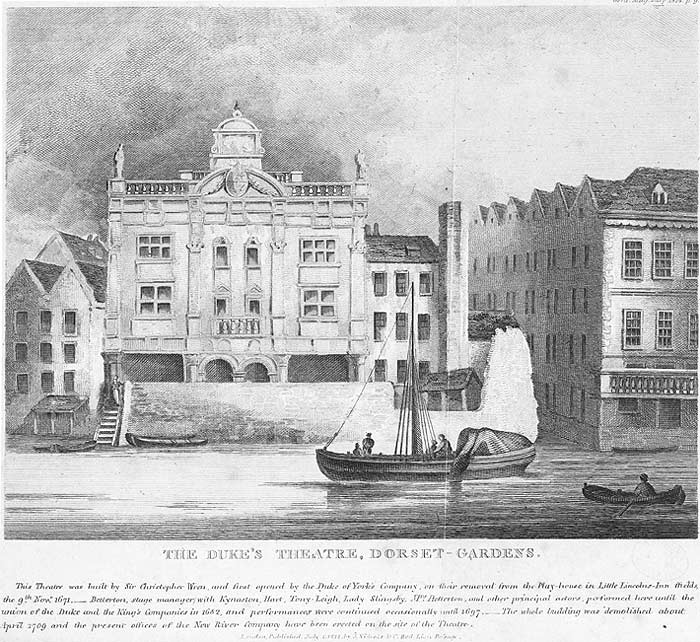
The Dorset Garden Theatre, on the Thames. It was fashionable and convenient for the audience to arrive by boat, avoiding the crime-ridden neighbourhood of Alsatia.

When Davenant died suddenly in 1668, the Duke's Company was left in disputed ownership and Pepys' eyesight forced him to stop keeping a diary. Thomas Betterton, though formally a minority shareholder, continued to run the Duke's Company, and, in the spirit of Davenant, commissioned the most elaborate of the Restoration playhouses, the theatre at Dorset Garden (or Dorset Gardens), with a flat for himself on top. Although the Dorset Garden Theatre quickly became a famous and glamorous venue, very little is concretely known about its construction, though a vague and undocumented tradition ascribes its design to Christopher Wren. The absence of Pepys' record means that performance data for the next decades are only patchily known.

=== French influence ===
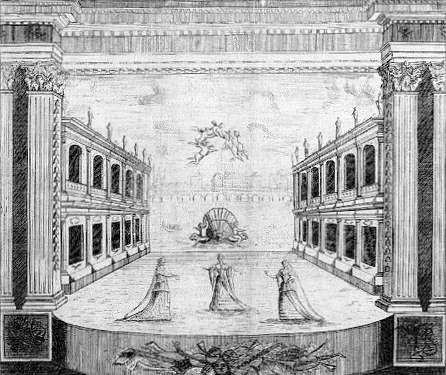
The first production at the King's Company's new theatre in Drury Lane in 1674 was the French opera Ariadne.

The machines at Dorset Garden and their flamboyant productions were strongly influenced by the French opera and tragédie en machines. Paris was home to some of the most elaborate visual and musical stage productions in Europe, and Betterton travelled to Paris in the summer of 1671 to learn from the sensation of the season, the comédie-ballet Psyché by Molière, Corneille, and Quinault, to music by Lully. "For several things concerning the decoration of the play, I am obliged to the French", acknowledged Thomas Shadwell in the introduction to his own Psyche in 1674. Even more directly influential were the French operatic visits to London, which sparked off a new interest in opera among London audiences. The King's Company, all but bankrupt after the crushing blow of the fire in Bridges Street, invited the French musician Robert Cambert to perform his opera Ariadne as one of the first productions at their new playhouse in Drury Lane. The Duke's Company responded to this guest appearance with a Shakespearean extravaganza at Dorset Garden: Shadwell's adaptation of Davenant's and Dryden's version of Shakespeare's Tempest, a piece designed to show off the new machinery:

The Front of the Stage is open'd, and the Band of 24 Violins, with the Harpsicals and Theorbo's which accompany the Voices, are plac'd between the Pit and the Stage. While the Overture is playing, the Curtain rises, and discovers a new Frontispiece, joyn'd to the great Pylasters, on each side of the Stage... Behind this is the Scene, which represents a thick Cloudy Sky, a very Rocky Coast, and a Tempestuous Sea in perpetual Agitation. This Tempest (suppos'd to be rais'd by Magick) has many dreadful Objects in it, as several Spirits in horrid shapes flying down amongst the Sailers, then rising and crossing in the Air. And when the Ship is sinking, the whole House is darken'd, and a shower of Fire falls upon 'em. This is accompanied with Lightning, and several Claps of Thunder, to the end of the Storm.

This multiplication of effects at the very outset of the play served as a shock and foretaste of what the audience would find farther along.

=== Dorset Garden specials ===
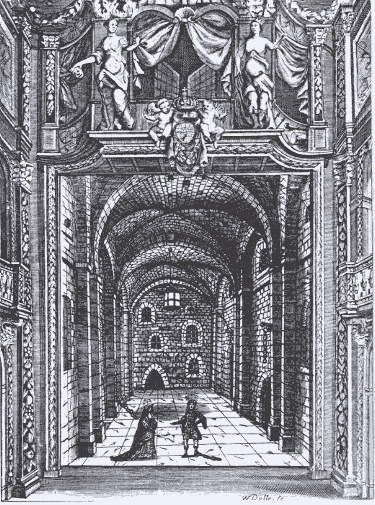
The plates illustrating Elkanah Settle's Empress of Morocco are the only contemporary representations of the baroque inside of Dorset Garden Theatre.

The technical capacities of Dorset Garden were little used for Restoration comedy. While most heroic drama included some scenes that showed off the perspective stage or used some of the simpler machines, spectacle on this limited scale could be just as well staged at competing theatres. The plays for which Dorset Garden was built were a category to themselves, separated from typical drama by their emphasis on mythology and scale, and their great expense. Due to the resources required, only five "machine plays", Davenant's version of Macbeth (1672–73), Settle's Empress of Morocco (probably 1673), Shadwell/Dryden/Davenant's Tempest (1673–74), Thomas Shadwell's long-awaited Psyche (1674–75), and Charles Davenant's Circe (1676–77), were produced during the 1670s; though they were hugely important for the finances of the Duke's Company.

Psyche had not one, but two, elaborate sets for each of the five acts, such as the setting for the beginning of Act 3:

The Scene is the Palace of Cupid, compos'd of wreath'd Columns of the Corinthian Order; the Wreathing is adorn'd with Roses, and the Columns have several little Cupids flying about 'em, and a single Cupid standing upon every Capital. At a good distance are seen three Arches, which divide the first Court from the other part of the building: The middle Arch is noble and high, beautified with Cupids and Festoons, and supported with Columns of the foresaid Order. Through these Arches is seen another Court, that leads to the main Building, which is at a mighty distance. All the Cupids, Capitals and Enrichments of the whole Palace are of Gold. Here the Cyclops are at work at a forge, forging great Vases of Silver. The Musick strikes up, they dance, hammering the Vases upon Anvils. After the Dance, Enter Vulcan.

The use of perspective scenery and many arches is evident here, creating an illusion of the first court being "at a good distance" and the next "at a mighty distance". This illusion of depth was a favorite device of Shadwell's, repeated when the scene changed halfway through the act:

The scene changes to the principal street of the city, with vast numbers of people looking down from the tops of houses, and out of the windows and balconies, which are hung with tapestry. In this street is a large triumphal arch, with columns of the Doric order, adorned with the statues of Fame and Honour, &c. beautified with festoons of flowers, all the enrichments of gold. Through this arch, at a vast distance, in the middle of a piazza, is seen a stately obelisk.

Although actual numbers are generally vague in these mass scene stage directions, the number of performers used, mainly dancers, was significantly higher than other performances of the time. The many highly paid dancers would have been busy in many roles, returning as townspeople after the scene change of Act 3 with most of the gold paint hastily washed off, and entranced looking upwards to see "Mars and Venus meet in the air in their chariots, his drawn by horses, and hers by doves".

For the theatre companies, each production was a financial risk. The aspect of the machine plays most remembered by modern historians is their economics, as this was what the old prompter Downes most vividly recalled when he wrote his Roscius Anglicanus in 1708. The scenery alone for Psyche cost more than £800, in contrast to the entire annual box office takings for the company at £10,000. Ticket prices for these performances would be raised to up to four times normal. Both Psyche and The Tempest complained of the production costs in their epilogues, hinting pointedly that the public ought to reward the "poor players" for their risk-taking and for offering splendors that had so far been reserved for royal masques:

We have stak'd all we have to treat you here,
And therefore, Sirs, you should not be severe.
We in one Vessel have adventur'd all;
The loss, should we be Shipwrack'd, were not small.
...
Poor Players have this day that Splendor shown,
Which yet but by Great Monarchs has been done.

The audience apparently agreed, transfixed by such sights as Venus ascending into the heavens and "being almost lost in the clouds", whereupon "Cupid flies up and gets into her chariot, and brings her back", followed by Jupiter appearing on a flying eagle. Psyche turned out highly profitable. It is altogether a pattern that the 1670s productions did make money, while those of the 1680s and 1690s barely broke even or were economic disasters for their respective theatre companies.

=== Parody ===
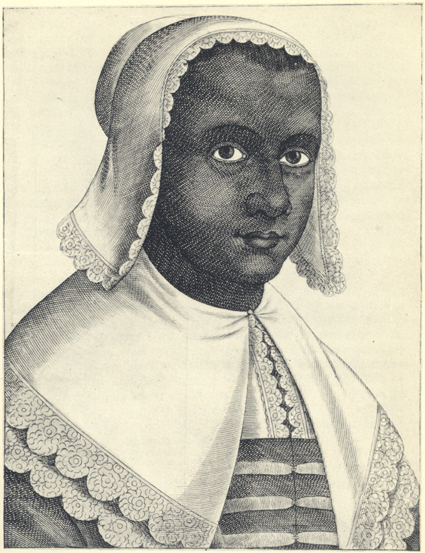
William Harris as Duffett's empress of Morocco.

Even after the King's Company got their new well-appointed playhouse in Drury Lane in 1674, they could not take full advantage of it, as they lacked the capital to mount competitive spectaculars. Instead, they attempted to simultaneously capitalize on Duke's most successful mid-1670s offerings by mounting several burlesques or parodies of them, written by Thomas Duffett. The records for the mid-1670s are particularly incomplete, and neither exact dates nor the public reaction to Duffett's pieces are known, but the printed versions have proved highly amusing to modern critics. The first of them, The Empress of Morocco, simultaneously caricatured Settle's Empress of Morocco and the sumptuous new Dorset Garden production of Davenant's Macbeth adaptation, with Duffett's three witches flying in over the pit on brooms at the high point of the action, followed by the descent of Hecate over the Stage "in a glorious chariot, adorned with pictures of hell and devils, and made of a large wicker basket". The Mock Tempest improves on the shower of fire over the audience in the Dorset Garden pseudo-Shakespearean tempest scene with a rain of "fire, apples, nuts".

== 1680s: Political spectacular ==
During the political unrest of 1678–84 with the Popish Plot and the Exclusion Crisis, there was little investment in spectaculars. In 1682, the companies merged, making Dorset Garden's technical resources available to Dryden, who rapidly overcame his principled objection to the superficiality of "spectacle" and "empty operas". The display of machinery and extravagant visuals that he went on to write, Albion and Albanius (1684–85), is quoted in the "Introductory" section, with the cave of Proteus rising out of the sea. Here is Juno in her flying peacock machine:

The Clouds divide, and JUNO appears in a Machine drawn by Peacocks; while a Symphony is playing, it moves gently forward, and as it descends, it opens and discovers the Tail of the Peacock, which is so large, that it almost fills the opening of the Stage between Scene and Scene.

Unusual visual allegory in this Tory panegyric of Charles II and the House of Stuart includes a figure representing the radical Whig leader Anthony Ashley-Cooper, 1st Earl of Shaftesbury "with fiend's wings, and snakes twisted round his body; he is encompassed by several fanatical rebellious heads, who suck poison from him, which runs out of a tap in his side." Unfortunate for the financial future of the company, while Dryden's propaganda piece was in preparation, Charles II died. James II succeeded him, and the Monmouth Rebellion which Shaftesbury had fomented broke out. On June 3, 1685, the day of the premiere, the Duke of Monmouth landed in the west. "The nation being in a great consternation", recollected Downes, "it was performed but six times, which not answering half the charge they were at, involved the company very much in debt." This traumatic fiasco ruled out all further operatic spectacle investment until the calmer times after the Glorious Revolution of 1689.

== 1690s: Opera ==
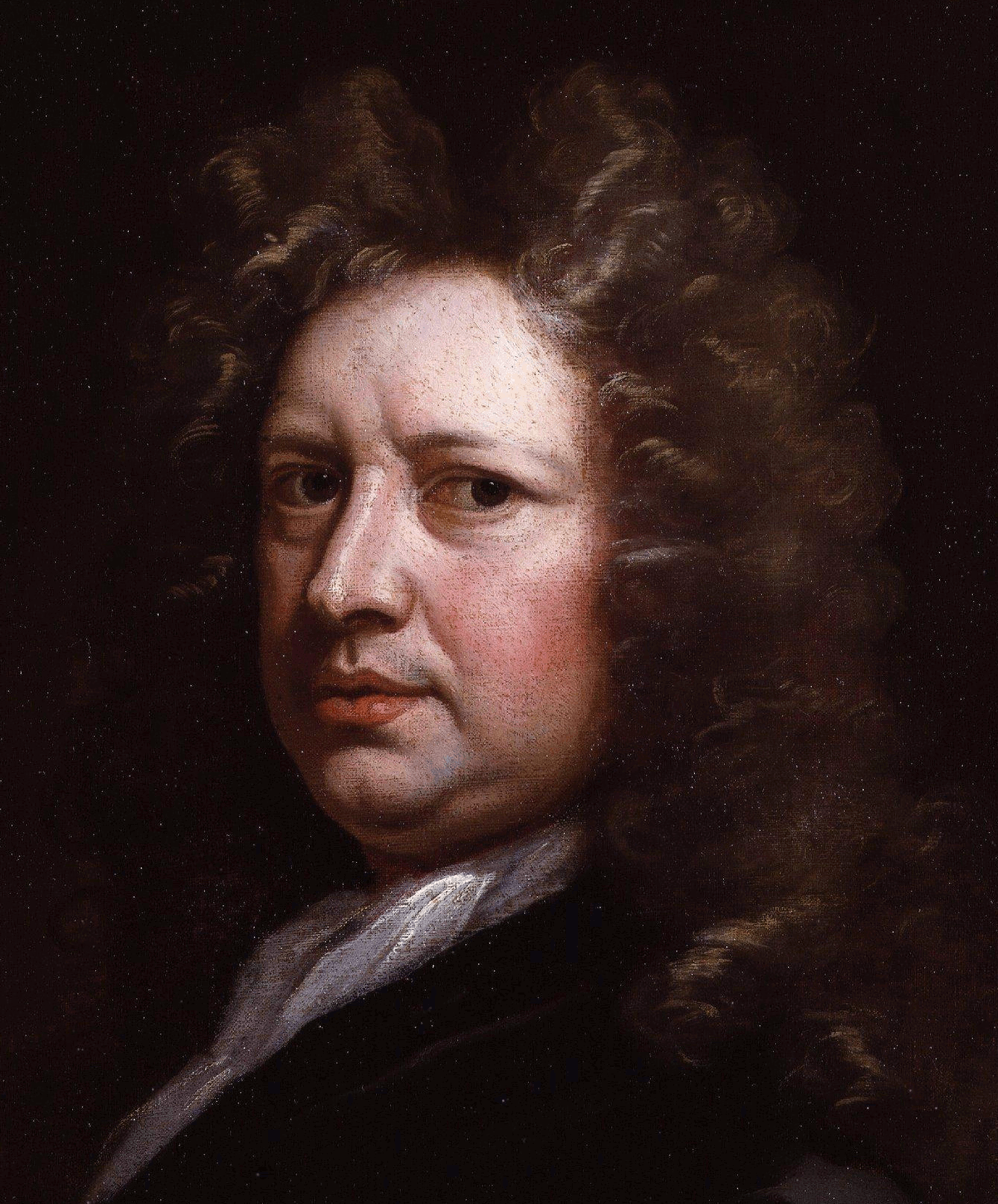
A middle-aged Thomas Betterton in the 1690s, painted by Godfrey Kneller.

While the United Company's takings were being bled off by Davenant's sons, one of whom, Alexander, was forced to flee the country in 1693 and other predatory investors, Thomas Betterton continued to act as de facto day-to-day manager and producer, enjoying a budget on the scale of Cecil B. DeMille. In the early 1690s, he staged the three real operas of the Restoration spectacular genre, or the shows usually so designated: Dioclesian (1689–90) by Massinger/Fletcher/Betterton; King Arthur (1690–91) by John Dryden; and The Fairy-Queen (1691–92), adapted from Shakespeare's A Midsummer Night's Dream by perhaps Elkanah Settle, all of them featuring music by Henry Purcell. The lavish variety entertainment Dioclesian, adapted by Betterton, with many monsters, dragons, and machines, from Massinger and Fletcher's History of Dioclesian, was popular throughout the 1690s and proved a financial success for the United Company. Dryden's much more serious King Arthur was the first operatic entertainment that Hume was prepared to consider an artistic success, with Purcell's music playing a major part of the entertainment and the songs "for once well integrated into the play".

At the very end of its history, the economics of the Restoration spectacular spiraled out of control with the magnificent production of The Fairy Queen in the 1691–92 season. It was a great success, but so stuffed with special effects and so expensive that it nevertheless proved impossible to turn a profit. As Downes recalls: "Though the court and town were wonderfully satisfied with it ... the expenses in setting it out being so great, the company got little by it." Its twelve-foot-high working fountain and six dancing real live monkeys have become notorious in theatre history.

The spectacular play saw a sharp decline during the Restoration period, but spectacle would continue on the English stage as the splendors of Italian grand opera hit London in the early 18th century. The Restoration economic spiral of the extravagant machine served as a lesson for 18th- and 19th-century theatrical entrepreneurs to dispense with playwrighting altogether and minimize the cast, utilizing any number of surprising effects and scenes in the dumbshow of pantomime and Harlequin, without attendant costs in music, dramatists, and cast.

There have been a small number of attempts to resurrect the Restoration spectacular as a background to modern cinema: Terry Gilliam's The Adventures of Baron Munchausen features at its start perhaps the most accurate reconstruction, with painted scenery, mechanisms and lighting effects typical of the period.

== See also ==
- Augustan drama
