= 1697 in music =

The year 1697 in music involved some significant events.

== Events ==
- Antonio Stradivari makes the Castelbarco cello.
- Giuseppe Torelli arrives at the court of Ansbach.
- Daniel Purcell and Jeremiah Clarke collaborate on the music for Elkanah Settle's play, World in the Moon.
- The Opéra du Quai au Foin in Brussels closes for the last time.

== Publications ==
- Guilio Cesare Arresti – 18 Sonate da organo di varii autori (includes work by Pietro Ziani, Giovanni Bassani, Giovanni Colonna, Bernardo Pasquini, and others, as well as Arresti himself)
- Philipp Heinrich Erlebach – Harmonische Freude musicalischer Freunde
- Aurelio Paolini – Suonate da camera a 3, Op. 1 (Venice: Giuseppe Sala)
- Henry Purcell – Ten Sonata’s in Four Parts (trio sonatas), published posthumously in London (Nos. 1–4 composed c1678–79, Nos. 7–9 possibly in 1681–82, No. 10 possibly 1683–84)
- Giovanni Maria Ruggieri – 10 Suonate da Chiesa, Op.4
- Daniel Speer – Grund-richtiger Unterricht der Musicalischen Kunst

== Classical music ==
- Jeremiah Clarke – The Duke of Glocester's March
- François Couperin – Laudate pueri
- Henri Dumont – Motets de Mr. Dumont a 4 parties
- Johann Krieger
  - Sechs musicalische Partien
  - Uns ist ein Kind geboren
- Carl Rosier – Sonata in C major, Kuckuckssonate
- Johann Christoph Rothe – St Matthew Passion

== Opera ==
- Hendrik Anders – Min- en wijn-strijd
- Antonio Caldara – La promessa sebata al primo
- André Campra – L'Europe galante (opera-ballet)
- Sebastiano Cherici – Ildegonda
- Henri Desmarets – Venus et Adonis
- André Cardinal Destouches – Issé
- Louis de Lacoste – Aricie
- Alessandro Scarlatti
  - La Caduta del Decemviri
  - L'Emireno, R.345.32

== Theoretical writings ==
- Johan Georg Ahlens musikalisches Sommer-Gespräche by Johann Georg Ahle, on cadences, rhetorical figures, and modes. Second part of Ahle's Musikalische Gespräche series of treatises in form of dialogues.

== Births ==
- January 1 – Johann Pfeiffer, violinist and composer (died 1761)
- January 30 – Johann Joachim Quantz, flautist and composer (died 1773)
- April 16 – Johann Gottlieb Görner, organist and composer (died 1778)
- April 26 – Adam Falckenhagen, lutenist and composer (died 1754)
- May 10 – Jean-Marie Leclair, violinist and composer (died 1764)
- June 11 – Francesco Antonio Vallotti, organist, music theorist and composer (died 1780)
- November 9 – Claudio Casciolini, composer (died 1760)
- December 5 – Giuseppe de Majo, organist and composer (died 1771)
- December 6 – Carlo Arrigoni, composer (died 1744)

== Deaths ==
- January 4 – Amalia Catharina, Countess of Erbach, poet and composer (born 1640)
- January 6 – Carlo Mannelli, violinist, castrato and composer (born 1640)
- March 23 – William Child, organist and composer (born 1606)
- March 29 – Nicolaus Bruhns, organist and composer (born 1665)
- May 29 – Giovanni Francesco Grossi, singer (born 1653)
