= Hugard =

Hugard is a French family name:

- Pierre Hugard (1726–1761), French composer
- Jean Hugard (1871–1959), stagename of Australian magician
