= And Can It Be =

Christian hymn written by Charles Wesley

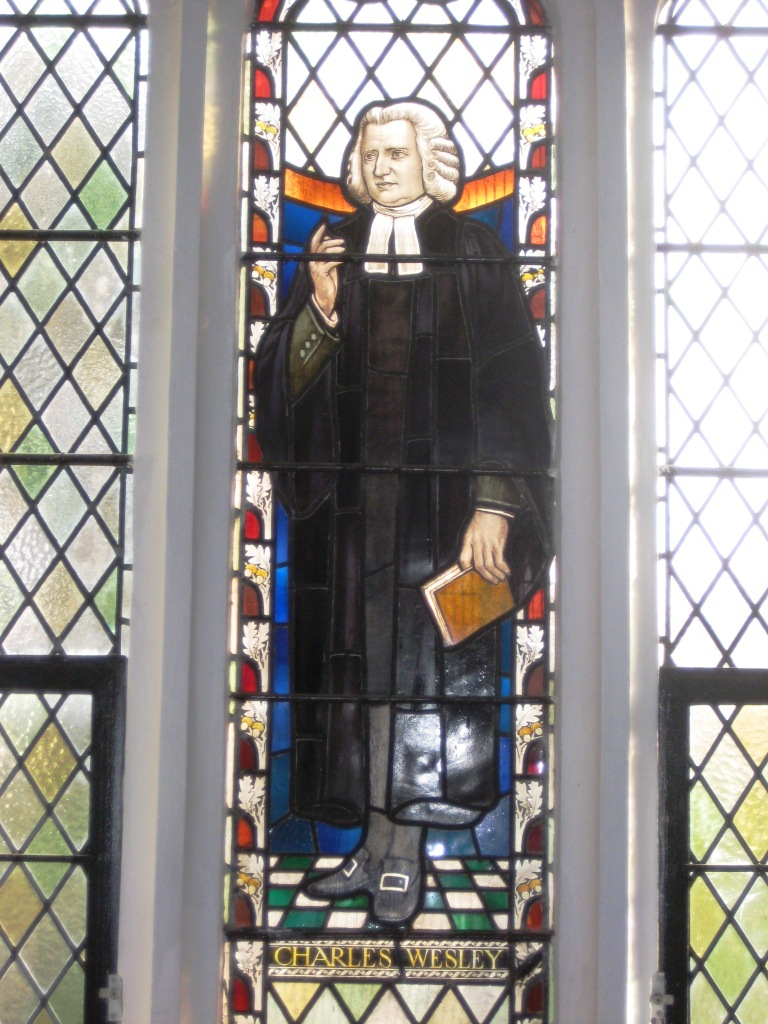
- Charles Wesley
- Genre: Hymn
- Written: 1738
- Text: Charles Wesley
- Based on: Psalm 145
- Meter: 8.8.8.8 (L.M.)
- Melody: "Sagina" by Thomas Campbell

"And Can It Be That I Should Gain?" (shortened to "And Can It Be" or And Can It Be?) is a Christian hymn written by Charles Wesley in 1738 to celebrate his conversion, which he regarded as having taken place on 21 May of that year. The hymn celebrates personal salvation through the death and resurrection of Jesus, and is one of the most popular Methodist hymns today.

== History ==
Charles Wesley (1707–1788), along with his brother John Wesley, was one of the founding figures of Methodism. Like his brother, he was profoundly influenced by a religious conversion. Charles's experience took place on 21 May 1738 (the feast of Pentecost), and it inspired him to write two new hymns, "And Can It Be that I Should Gain" and "Where Shall My Wondering Soul Begin?". After this, Charles went on to become a prolific hymnodist, composing over 6,500 hymns.

The original six-verse hymn "And Can It Be" was first published in 1739 in John Wesley's hymnal, Hymns and Sacred Poems, with the title "Free Grace".

The hymn remains popular today and is included in many contemporary hymn books. In 2013, following a survey conducted by the BBC Television programme Songs of Praise, "And Can It Be" was voted number 6 in the UK's Top 100 Hymns. Diarmaid MacCulloch suggests that the hymn is one of the best-loved of Wesley's six thousand hymns.

"And Can It Be" was the source for Phillips, Craig & Dean's 2003 Contemporary Christian song "You Are My King (Amazing Love)". The Newsboys' cover of the song reached No. 1 on the Billboard Christian songs chart.

== Words ==
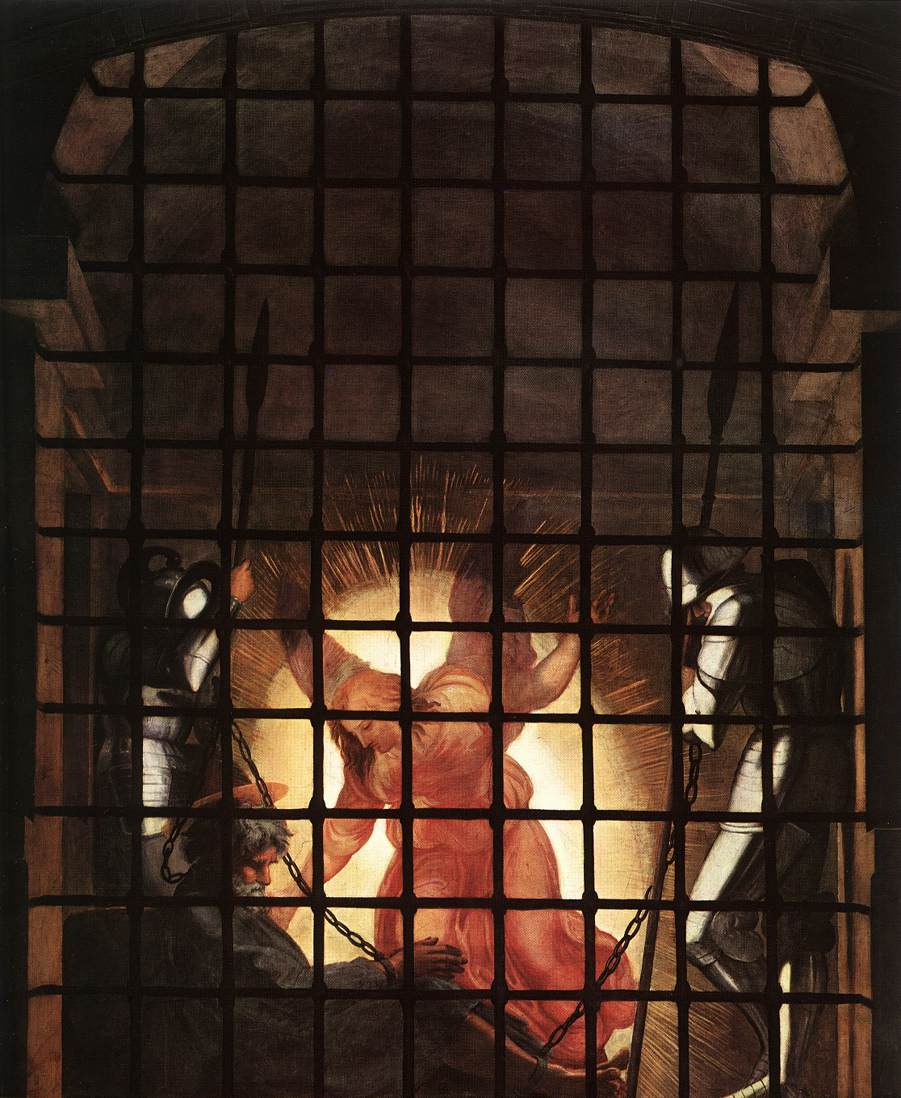
"My chains fell off" - the Liberation of Peter (1514 fresco by Raphael, Vatican Museums)

The title and first lines of the hymn are framed as a rhetorical question written in the first person, in which the narrator/singer asks if he can benefit from the sacrifice of Jesus (the blood of Christ), despite being the cause of Christ's death. The hymn makes reference to several biblical events, and each verse returns to the individual's experience of faith and personal salvation.

The second verse expresses amazement at the apparent paradox of the death of the immortal Christ — "'Tis mystery all! Th'Immortal dies!" — referring to the New Testament accounts of the Passion of Jesus. The following verse celebrates the Incarnation of Jesus and borrows a verse from Philippians 2:6-8, "Emptied himself of all but Love, and bled for Adam's helpless race".

In the fourth verse ("My chains fell off"), Wesley makes reference to the imprisonments of both Saint Peter and Saint Paul — the Liberation of Peter in Acts 12 and the Liberation of Paul in Acts 16 — as metaphors for the narrator's liberation from sin.

With the line "Thine eye diffused a quickening ray", Wesley describes the liberating power of God descending on the captive soul using words closely based on a line from Alexander Pope's 1717 poem Eloisa to Abelard:

Thy eyes diffus'd a reconciling ray,
And gleams of glory brighten'd all the day.

The fifth verse uses words from Romans 8:1 to describe the doctrine of Justification by faith — "No condemnation now I dread" — and looks forward to the believer receiving a crown in heaven after death.

== Musical setting ==
Tune Sagina (Pearlwort)
Thomas Campbell's tune for "And Can It Be?"

Early publications of "And Can It Be" set the hymn to a variety of tunes. One of the first settings was to the tune Surrey, composed by the songwriter and dramatist Henry Carey. In A Collection of Tunes, Set to Music, as they are commonly sung at the Foundery (1742) the hymn was set to Samuel Akeroyde's tune Crucifixion, and in the 1786 edition of A Collection of Hymns, the tune Birmingham was specified.

Not until the twentieth century did the hymn begin to be paired with the tune to which it is now almost exclusively sung, Sagina (Pearlwort), composed by the Yorkshireman Thomas Campbell (1800–1876), and first published in 1825 in The Bouquet: a collection of tunes composed and adapted to Wesley's Hymns. All the tunes in the collection were given botanical titles, and Sagina, named after Sagina, a small flowering plant in the "pink" family, was wedded to a translation by John Wesley of Johann Scheffler's "Ich will dich lieben, meine Stärke" ("Thee will I love, my strength, my tow'r"). The earliest documented pairing of Sagina with Charles Wesley's "And Can It Be?" text is in the collection The Salvation Army Music, edited by William Booth and published in 1900 in New York.

Musicologist Percy Scholes characterises this type of tune as "Old Methodist" and considers that its style may have been influenced by the popular choruses of George Frideric Handel.
