= Peter Jørgen Frydendahl =

Danish stage actor (1766–1830)

Jørgen Peter Frydendahl
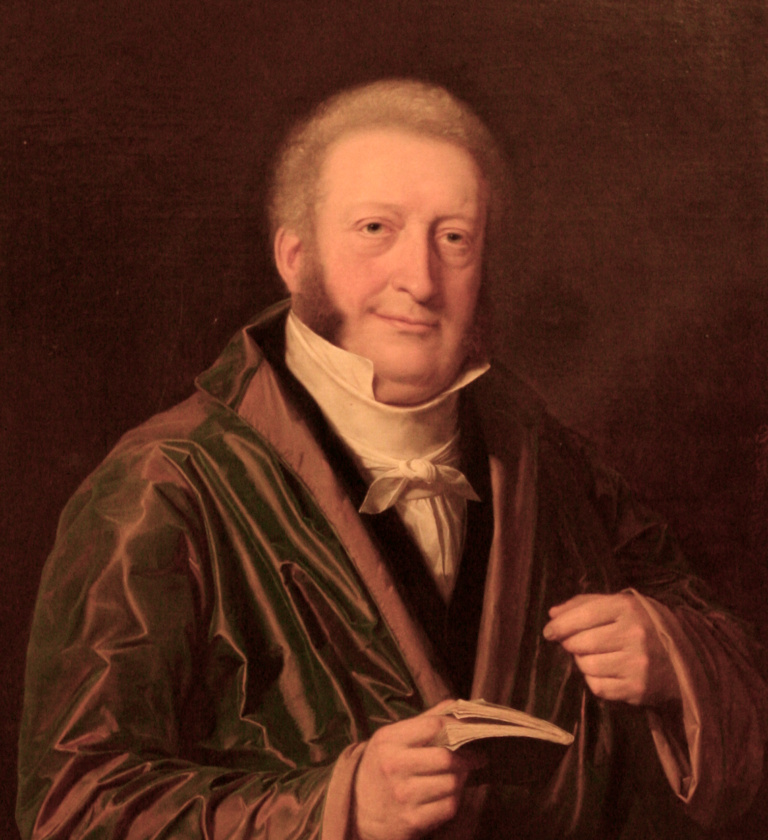
- Portrait by David Monies
- Born: 18 October 1766; Copenhagen, Denmark
- Died: 20 February 1830 (aged 63); Copenhagen, Denmark
- Occupation: Actor
- Years active: 1786-
- Spouse: Catharine Frydendahl (m. 1797)

Peter Jørgen Frydendahl (1766-1830), was a Danish stage actor. He belonged to the elite actors of the Royal Danish Theatre from 1786. He was described as a versatile actor, was active also as a singer, and particularly noted for his comic roles, for which he was called the most noted of his time. He was also principal of the acting school from 1816.

== Early life and education ==
Frydendahl grew up as the son of textile merchant Hans Peter Frydendahl (c. 1705-91) and Kirstine Mortensdatter (c. 1745-94) but his real father was Hans Wilhelm von Warnstedt who had served as managing director of the Royal Danish Theatre since 1876. He was apprenticed as an office clerk before his father got him into the Royal Theatre's singing school where he studied under Michel Angelo Potenza.

== Career ==
He had his debut on 7 December 1786 as Belcour in The West Indian followed by a role as Charles in The School for Scandal. Both performances were poorly received.

== Personal life ==
Frydendahl was the spouse of Catharine Frydendahl.

== List of roles ==
=== 1780s ===
- 1780 Den vægelsindede as Musikant
- 1785 Den døve elsker as Den fremmede
- 1786 Den stundesløse as Lars Dintfas, skriverkarl
- 1786 Figaros giftermaal as Tjener
- 1786 Vestindianeren as Belcour, ung vestindianer
- 1787 Bagtalelsens skole as Charles
- 1787 Barselstuen as Godthard, kantor
- 1787 Claudina af Villa Bella as Vagt
- 1787 Crispin lakaj og doktor as Leander, Alcines elsker
- 1787 Crispin sin herres rival as Valerius
- 1787 De nysgerrige mandfolk as Eraste, Julies elsker
- 1787 Den ellevte Juni as Proprietær / Vægter
- 1787 Den gerrige as Graaben
- 1787 Den nysgerrige as Grev Donner
- 1787 Den stolte as Philinte, Isabellas frier
- 1787 Den stundesløse as Barber
- 1787 Det uventede møde as Banu, slave
- 1787 Don Juan as Ragotin
- 1787 Emilie Galotti as Conti, maler
- 1787 Enke- og ligkassen as Bud
- 1787 Eugenie as Sir Carl, Eugenies broder
- 1787 Gert Westphaler as Apotekerdreng
- 1787 Greven af Walltron as Von Lictenau, adjudant
- 1787 Henrik den fjerdes jagt as Jean, jæger
- 1787 Hververne as Baron Wengfort
- 1787 Jeppe paa Bjerget as Baronens sekretær
- 1787 Kilderejsen as Leander
- 1787 Købmanden i Smyrna as Spanier
- 1787 Mediceerne as Montsec
- 1787 Melampe as Gamle Pandolfus
- 1787 Plutus as Moralist / Raadsherre
- 1787 Søofficererne as Smirk, gadejunker
- 1787 Ulysses von Ithacia as Kejser Asverus
- 1788 Aglae as Erastenes
- 1788 Aktierne as Frands Kronskjold
- 1788 Bagtalelsens skole as Charles
- 1788 Barberen i Sevilla as Alkade
- 1788 Datum in Blanco as Barthold, officer
- 1788 Den bedragne formynder as Fuldmægtig
- 1788 Den ellevte Juni as Proprietær / Vægter
- 1788 Den forlegne forfatter as Pladder
- 1788 Den gerrige as Valerius
- 1788 Den politiske as kandestøber Sanderus
- 1788 Den stundesløse as Lars Dintfas
- 1788 Den sværmende filosof as Turburgio
- 1788 Den taknemlige as søn Mikkel, bondekarl
- 1788 Den uheldige lighed as Denbigh
- 1788 Desertøren af sønlig kærlighed as Stich, korporal
- 1788 Det lykkelige skibbrud as Leander
- 1788 Florentineren as Leander
- 1788 General Schlenzheim og hans familie as Vagtmester Zelle
- 1788 Hekseri as Byvagt
- 1788 Henrik og Pernille as Leander
- 1788 Jeppe paa Bjerget as Baronens sekretær
- 1788 Jægerne as Rudolph
- 1788 Markeder as Løjtnant
- 1788 Pernilles korte frøkenstand as Leander
- 1788 Skotlænderinden as Kafégæst
- 1788 Skovbyggeren as Dolmon
- 1789 Aglae as Erastenes
- 1789 Apothekeren og doctoren as Politikommisær
- 1789 Bagtalelsens skole as Henry Bumper
- 1789 Barselstuen as Officer
- 1789 De to gerrige as Mustafa / Ali
- 1789 Den pantsatte bondedreng as Postkarl
- 1789 Den stundesløse as Barber / Lars Dintfas
- 1789 Den sværmende filosof as Florian, Clarices elsker
- 1789 Den uformodentlige forhindring as Valerius, spradebasse
- 1789 Desertøren as Eisenfelt, vagtmester
- 1789 Det unge menneske efter moden as Strax
- 1789 Det uventede møde as Kalender
- 1789 Don Juan as Don Alfonse
- 1789 Fejltagelserne as Krogæst
- 1789 Forbryderen af ærgerrig as Baron von Ritau
- 1789 Greven af Olsbach as von Wernin
- 1789 Henrik den Fjerdes jagt as Marki Conchiny
- 1789 Henrik og Pernille as Leander
- 1789 Hververne as Kittmann, vagtmester
- 1789 Julestuen as Leander
- 1789 Myndlingen as Valerius
- 1789 Ringen as Opvarter
- 1789 Tartuffe as Damon
- 1790 Damon og Phytias as Leptimus
- 1790 De aftakkede officerer as von Fannenberg
- 1790 De nysgerrige fruentimmere as Valerius

=== 1879s ===
- 1790 De to gerrige as Ali
- 1790 De tre forpagtere as Jacob, Sørens søn
- 1790 Den stundesløse as Leander, Leonoras elsker
- 1790 Desertøren af sønlig kærlighed as Stich, korporal
- 1790 Det gavmilde testamente as Eraste, Isabelles kæreste
- 1790 Dobleren as Valerius, dobleren
- 1790 Frode og Fingal as Alf
- 1790 Grovsmeden as Bastian
- 1790 Italienerinden i London as Lord Arespingh
- 1790 Jacob von Tyboe as Officer
- 1790 Julie as Præsident
- 1790 Kun seks retter as Fritz
- 1790 Selim og Mirza as Orcan, sømand
- 1790 Skovbyggeren as Jæger
- 1790 Steffen og Lise as Jacob
- 1790 Søofficererne as Simmons
- 1790 Zemire og Azor as Sander, persisk købmand
- 1791 Aglae as Erastenes
- 1791 Bagtalelsens skole as Henry Bumber
- 1791 Balders Død as Thor
- 1791 Barselstuen as Officer
- 1791 Den honette ambition as Leander, Leonoras forlovede
- 1791 Den naturlige søn as Hr. Blushenley
- 1791 Den værdige fader as Grev Monheim
- 1791 Høstgildet as Thord Halvorson
- 1791 Lilla as Lubin, hyrde
- 1791 Richard Løvehjerte as Florestan
- 1791 Strelitzerne as Officer
- 1791 Syngesygen as Chrysante
- 1791 Taknemlighed og utaknemlighed as Løjtnant Berlau
- 1791 Zarine as Fire Sacer
- 1792 Aglae as Erastenes
- 1792 Bagtalelsens skole as Henry Bumber
- 1792 Balders Død as Thor
- 1792 Barselstuen as Gothard, kantor
- 1792 De forstilte utroskaber as Mondor
- 1792 Den bogstavelige udtydning as William
- 1792 Den døve elsker as Georg
- 1792 Den nysgerrige as Prins Kasimir
- 1792 Den skinsyge kone as Lord Trinket
- 1792 Feen Ursel as Oberjægermester
- 1792 Indianerne i England as Samuel, toldinspektør
- 1792 Jeppe paa Bjerget as Baronens sekretær / Doktor
- 1792 Maskeraden as Leander
- 1792 Myndlingerne as Hofraad Fressel
- 1792 Papegøjen as Ludvig
- 1792 Skotlænderinden as Kafégæst
- 1793 Apothekeren og doctoren as Politikommisær
- 1793 De to hatte as Hr. von Mørbak
- 1793 Indtoget as Bræger, degn
- 1793 Lise og Peter as Jespersen, købmand
- 1794 Apothekeren og doctoren as Politikommisær
- 1795 Aftenen as Vilhelm Steenberg
- 1795 Apothekeren og doctoren as Stødvel, apoteker
- 1795 Bagtalelsens skole as Gæst
- 1795 Barselstuen as Offic
- 1795 De to søskende as Dorval
- 1795 De to venner as Saint Albin, general told-forpagter
- 1795 Den stundesløse as Christoffer Federmesser
- 1795 Den værdige kone as Hr. Berg
- 1795 Det unge menneske efter moden as Strax
- 1795 Fejltagelserne as Marlow
- 1795 Gamle og nye sæder as Grøndal den yngre
- 1795 Gulddaasen as Visberg, proprietær
- 1795 Hekseri as Dommer
- 1795 Høstgildet as Hans Jensen
- 1795 I oprørt vand er godt at fiske as Baron
- 1795 Kinafarerne as Merian
- 1795 Kjolen fra Lyon as Hr. von Hornau
- 1795 Kong Theodorus i Venedig as Theodorus, konge af Korsika
- 1795 Minna af Barnheim as Ricaut de la Marliniere
- 1795 Moderen as Hr. von Horst
- 1795 Peter bryllup as Hans Smed
- 1795 Renaud d'Ast as Hr. Lisimon, guvernør
- 1795 Rosenbruden i Salency as Herremand
- 1795 Serenaden as Degnen
- 1795 Steffen og Lise as Jacob
- 1795 Strelitzerne as Soukaninn
- 1795 Zemire og Azor as Zander, persisk købmand
- 1796 Advokaterne as Justitsråd Gleiser
- 1796 Barberen i Sevilla as Grev Almaviva
- 1796 Barselstuen as Officer
- 1796 Den overtroiske as Hans Snak, urtegaardsmand
- 1796 Den politiske kandestøber Sanderus
- 1796 Den skarpe kniv kan let faa skaar Hofraad Reichenstein
- 1796 Den værdige fader Grev Monheim
- 1796 Dyveke Kong Christiern den anden
- 1796 Festen i Valhal Thor
- 1796 Gulddaasen Visberg, proprietær
- 1796 Indtoget Bræger, degn
- 1796 Kuren Schrep
- 1796 Landsbypigen Orgon, Sophies formynder
- 1796 Peters bryllup Hans Smed
- 1796 Ringen Grev Klingsberg
- 1796 Skotlænderinden Kafégæst
- 1796 Søofficererne Grev Worthinton
- 1796 Vinhøsten Oberst Tosberg
- 1796 Væddemaalet Marki af Blainville
- 1797 Bagtalelsens skole Gæst
- 1797 Barnlig kærlighed Armand
- 1797 Coquetten og den forstilte kyskhed Damis, Cephises mand
- 1797 De fire formyndere Sir Phillip Modelove
- 1797 De noble passioner Grev Blomsterkrantz
- 1797 De snorrige fættere Hr. Orgon
- 1797 Den stundesløse Leander / Erik Madsen, bogholder
- 1797 Dragedukken Gæst
- 1797 Embedsiver Justitsraad Listar
- 1797 Galejslaven Greven af Anplace
- 1797 Hververne Kittmann, Vagtmester
- 1797 Jaordet Ville, købmand
- 1797 Jockeyen Damon
- 1797 Jøden Charles Ratchliffe
- 1797 Lykkens hjul Woodville
- 1797 Menneskehad og anger Major von der Horst
- 1797 Niels Ebbesen af Nørreris Stig Andersen
- 1797 Nonnerne Postkarl
- 1797 Sammensværgelsen mod Peter d. Store En fransk officer
- 1797 Strelitzerne Soukaninn
- 1797 Venskab paa prøve Blandford, skibskaptajn
- 1798 Bagtalelsens skole Gæst
- 1798 Barselstuen Officer
- 1798 Den ellevte Juni Proprietær
- 1798 Den skinsyge kone Major Oakly
- 1798 Det unge menneske efter moden Lisimon
- 1798 Elskernes skole Astolfo
- 1798 Entreprenøren i knibe Polifem, entreprenør
- 1798 Falsk undseelse Justitsraad Heldmand
- 1798 Fejltagelserne Roller, en ung julinsk helt
- 1798 Pebersvendene Poul Jensen
- 1798 Peters bryllup Hans Jensen
- 1798 Rejsen til Byen Hofraad Reising
- 1798 Ringen Grev Klingsberg
- 1798 Skumlerne Edward smith
- 1799 Bortførelsen Arvire, en britannisk Fyrste
- 1799 Desertøren Eisenfelts, vagtmester
- 1799 Emigranterne Aldrende emigrant
- 1799 Hekseri Dommer
- 1799 Hververne Baron Plume
- 1799 Medbejlerne Major Schreckenfeldt
- 1799 Naturens Røst Belcour, Claires Fader
- 1799 Philip og Annette Martin, kræmmer
- 1799 Udstyret Kammerraad Wallmann
- 1800 De pudserlige arvinger Baron von Falkenburg
- 1800 Den stundesløse Erik Madsen, Bogholder

=== 1800s ===
' 1800 Det lykkelige skibbrud as Officer

- 1800 Fredsmægleren as Dorval
- 1800 Herman von Unna as Greven af Unna
- 1800 Landsbyteatret as Kaptajn Lavish
- 1800 Min bedstemoder as Lafleur
- 1800 Nonnerne as Frontin
- 1800 Optimisten as Oberst Dalberg
- 1800 Ægteskabsforslaget as Cazini, Rosalines onkel
- 1801 Advokaterne as Justitsraad Gleiser
- 1801 Armod og høimodighed as Peter Plum
- 1801 Barberen i Sevilla as Grev Almaviva
- 1801 De forliebte haandværksfolk as Partout
- 1801 De to grenaderer as Sans-Regret, Dragon
- 1801 Herman von Unna as Greven af Unna
- 1801 Hvad vil folk sige? as Officer
- 1801 Høstgildet as Thord Halvorsen
- 1801 Indtoget as Bræger, degn i en Landsby
- 1801 Myndlingerne as Kansler Flessel
- 1801 Pebersvendene as Poul Jensen
- 1801 Sølvbrylluppet as Grev Skjoldholm
- 1801 Udstyret as Kammerraad Wallmann
- 1802 Armod og høimodighed as Claus
- 1802 Barberen i Sevilla as Grev Almaviva
- 1802 Den fattige familie as Grandin
- 1802 Den politiske kandestøber as Sanderus
- 1802 Den snedige brevvexling as Fougère, historie-Maler
- 1802 Hjemkomsten as Poul Hansen
- 1802 Octavia as Ventidius, romersk general
- 1802 Onkelrollen as Dorval, handelsmand
- 1802 Operetten as Florimon
- 1802 Syv tusinde Rigsdaler as Kaptajn Hennings
- 1803 Barberen i Sevilla as Grev Almaviva
- 1803 Barselstuen as Officer
- 1803 Coquetten og den forstilte kyskhed as Damis, Cephises mand
- 1803 De fire formyndere as Sir Phillip Modelove
- 1803 De lystige passagerer as Saint-Hilaire, skuespiller
- 1803 De to dage as Guiscardo
- 1803 Den stundesløse as Erik Madsen, Bogholder
- 1803 Den værdige fader as Grev Wodmar
- 1803 En time borte as Merinval
- 1803 Lønkammeret as Dupont
- 1803 Pebersvendene as Poul Jensen
- 1803 Pigen fra Marienborg as Alexander Menzikoff, fyrste
- 1803 Ponce de Léon as Caffardo
- 1803 Rivalerne as Hr. Orgon
- 1803 Rosenkæderne as Thøger, broder til Norbeks første kone
- 1803 Skumlerne as Grev von scharfeneck, premierminister
- 1804 Advokaterne as Justitsraad Geisler
- 1804 Balders død as Thor
- 1804 Barnlig kærlighed as Armand
- 1804 Barselstuen as Officer
- 1804 Den logerende as Sommer, godsejer
- 1804 Kun seks retter as Major von Wurmb
- 1804 Kvaksalverne as Robert
- 1804 Nytaarsgaven as Meerval, en rig mand
- 1804 Rejsen til Ostindien as Courville, rig købmand
- 1804 Skatten as Geronte, en gammel mand
- 1804 Skælmen i sin egen snare as Beaupré, skibsbygmester
- 1805 Barselstuen as Officer
- 1805 De to Figaroer as Grev Almaviva
- 1805 Den stundesløse as Erik Madsen, Bogholder
- 1805 Fusentasterne as Hr. Klingstrup, herremand fra Jylland
- 1805 Selim Prins af Algier as Barbarossa
- 1805 Utidig fortrolighed as Dorimond, gammel herremand
- 1806 Armod og høimodighed as Peter Plum
- 1806 En times ægteskab as Hr. de Marce, gammel herremand
- 1806 Eugenie as Mylord Greve af Clarendon
- 1806 Menneskehad og anger as Grev Wintersee
- 1806 Romeo og Juliette as Capulet, adelsmand
- 1806 Skillerummet as Durivage
- 1806 Ungdom og galskab as Grøndal, en gammel maler
- 1807 Barselstuen as Officer
- 1807 Maleren af kærlighed as Merfort
- 1807 Tvekampen as Don simon, alcalde i Segovia
- 1808 Armod og høimodighed as Peter Plum
- 1808 Barberen i Sevilla as Grev Almaviva
- 1808 Den forladte datter as Baron Skumring
- 1808 Henrik den femtes ungdom as Rochester, hans yndling
- 1808 Kærlighed under maske as Belcour, gammel herremand
- 1809 Advokaterne as Justitsraad Geisler
- 1809 De forliebte haandværksfolk as Partout
- 1809 Emilie Galotti as Odoardo Galotti
- 1809 Marionetterne as Dorvilé
- 1809 Sovedrikken as Brause, kirurg

=== 1810s ===
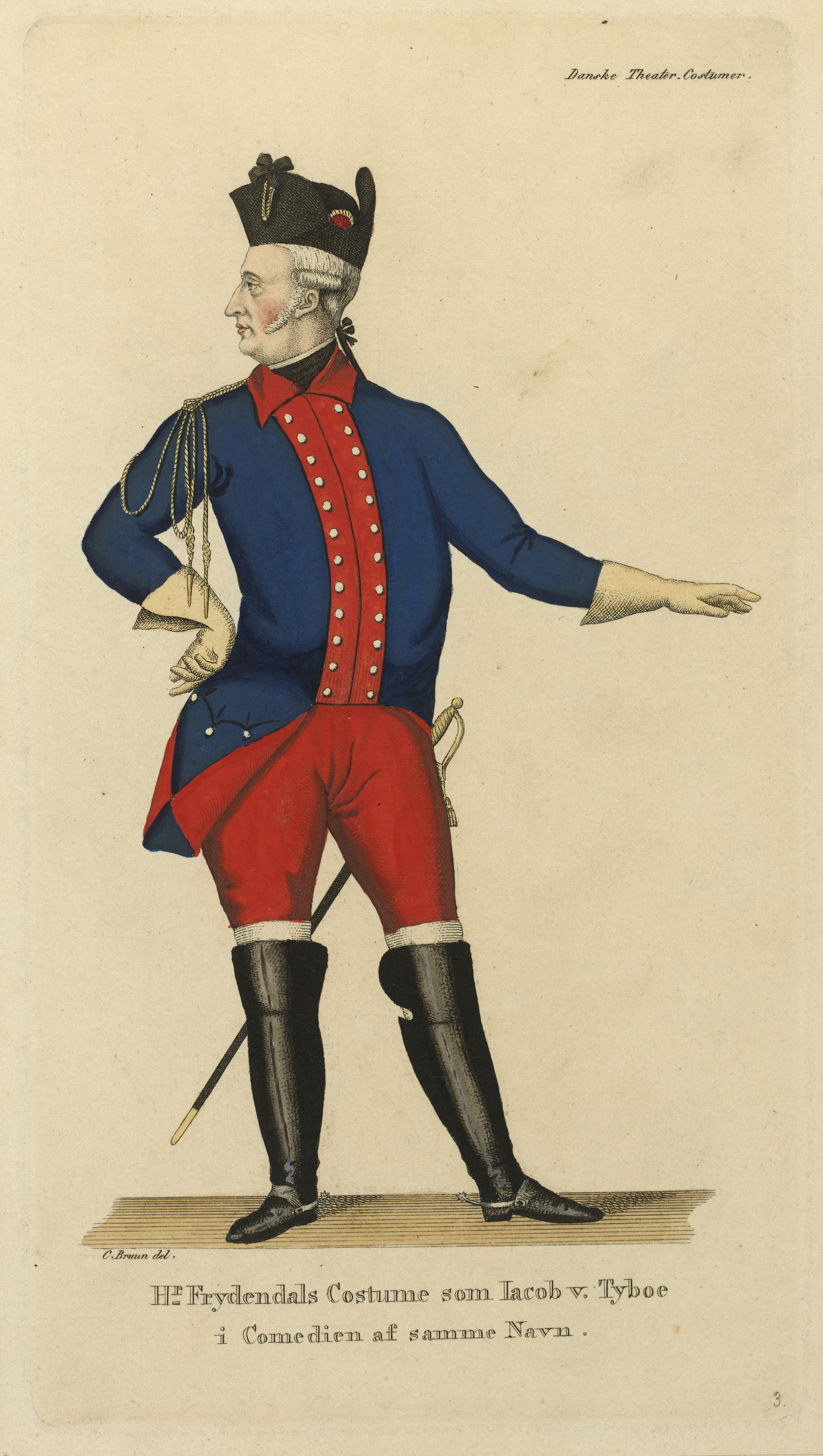
Frydendal's costume for the role as Iacob v. Tyboe

- 1810 Bagtalelsens skole as Sir Peter Teazle
- 1810 De fire formyndere as Kaptajn Harcourt
- 1810 De Sansesløse Major Staubwirbel as * 1810 Den forladte datter Baron Skumring
- 1810 Den unge moder as Dorimont, købmand
- 1810 Hververne as Hr. von Rosenau, præsident
- 1810 Juliane von Lindorak as Feltmarskal Dombraun
- 1810 Snedkeren i Lifland as Peter den store, russisk kejser
- 1811 De to dage as Armand, første parlaments-præsident i Paris
- 1811 Figaros giftermaal as Grev Almaviva
- 1811 Jacob von Tyboe as Jacob von Tyboe
- 1811 Lommeprokuratoren as Guillaume, klædekræmmer
- 1811 Octavia as Cæsar Octavianus
- 1811 Tyve-Aars-Festen as Major Broderkjær, vestindisk * regeringsraad
- 1812 Advokaterne as Justitsraad Gleiser
- 1812 Bagtalelsens skole as Sir Peter Teazle
- 1812 Den forladte datter as Baron Skumring
- 1812 Henrik den fjerdes jagt as Hertugen af sully, * premierminister
- 1812 Herman von Unna as Wenceslaus, romersk kejser
- 1813 Advokaterne as Justitsraad Gleiser
- 1813 Bagtalelsens skole as Sir Peter Teazle
- 1814 Dyveke as Kong Christiern den anden
- 1815 Landsbyteatret as Mr. Mist
- 1815 Aabenbar krig as Baron Frydenhjelm
- 1816 Balders død as Thor
- 1816 Beverley as Stukeli
- 1816 Bortførelsen as Baron Rosendahl
- 1816 Crispin som fader as Orgon
- 1816 Den butte velgører as Dorval
- 1816 Diderich Menschenskræk as Diderich Menschenskræk
- 1816 Galejslaven as Greven af Anplace
- 1816 Jægerne as v. Zeck, amtmand i Weissenberg
- 1816 Pebersvendene as Advokat Rosendal
- 1816 Selim Prins af Algier as Barbarossa
- 1816 Sovedrikken as Brause, kirurg
- 1817 Abracadabra as Arv, gaardskarl
- 1817 Beverley as Stukeli, Beverleys falske ven
- 1817 Den forladte datter as Halvor Jerken, gammel betjent
- 1817 Den gerrige as Valerius
- 1817 Hververne as Hr. von Rosenau, præsident
- 1817 Sølvbrylluppet as Grev Skjoldholm
- 1818 Apothekeren og doctoren as Stødvel, apoteker
- 1818 Dragedukken as Jacob Olsen, skomager
- 1818 Dyveke as Kong Christian II
- 1818 Niels Ebbesen af Nørreris as Gert den store
- 1819 Dyveke as Kong Christian II
- 1819 Figaros giftermaal as Figaro, grevens kammertjener og * slotsforvalter
- 1819 Romeo og Juliette as Capulet, adelsmand
- 1819 Vinhøsten as Oberst v. Tosberg, godsejer
- 1820 Herman von Unna as Greven af Unna

=== 1820s ===
- 1820 Zemire og Azor as Sander, en persisk købmand
- 1821 Diderich Menschenskræk as Diderich Menschenskræk
- 1821 Dyveke as Kong Christiern den anden
- 1821 Falsk undseelse as Justitsraad Heldmand
- 1821 Figaros giftermaal as Don Gusman Bridoison
- 1821 Kun seks retter as Major von Wurmb
- 1821 Vinhøsten as Oberst v. Tosberg, godsejer
- 1822 Apothekeren og doctoren as Stødvel, apoteker
- 1822 Barselstuen as Officer
- 1822 De to dage as Guiscardo
- 1822 Ægteskabsskolen as Wilhelm Stjernholm, Alberts broder
- 1823 Apothekeren og doctoren as Stødvel, apoteker
- 1823 Det stille vand har den dybe grund as Baron Friedheim
- 1823 Hekseri as Dommer
- 1824 Apothekeren og doctoren as Stødvel, apoteker
- 1824 De to poststationer as Duflos
- 1824 Fejltagelserne as Heardcastle
- 1824 Landsbypoeten as Baron Vieux-Bois
- 1825 Barberen i Sevilla as Bartholo, doktor
- 1825 Barselstuen as Officer
- 1825 Det stille vand har den dybe grund as Baron Friedheim
- 1825 Vestindianeren as Major O'Flaherty, gammel officer
- 1826 Apothekeren og doctoren as Stødvel, apoteker
- 1826 Entreprenøren i knibe as Polifem, entreprenør
- 1826 Hamlet as Polonius (Dub.)
- 1827 Barselstuen as Officer
- 1827 Bortførelsen as Hr. v. Sachau
- 1827 Den aabne brevveksling as Goldbach, en Aagerkarl
- 1827 Det tvungne giftermaal as Marphurius
- 1827 Diderich Menschenskræk as Diderich Menschenskræk
- 1827 Dyveke as Kong Christian II
- 1827 Emilie Galotti as Marinelli, Prinsens Kammerherre
- 1827 Enken og ridehesten as Warbifax, advokat
- 1827 Tartuffe as Orgon, Elmires mand
- 1828 Apothekeren og doctoren as Stødvel, apoteker
- 1828 Købmanden i Venedig as Hertugen af Venedig
- 1829 Barselstuen as Officer
- 1829 Jægerne as v. Zeck, amtmand i Weissenberg
- 1829 Ringen as Hr. von Holm, en rig bankier

=== 1830s ===
- 1830 Aabenbar krig as Baron Frydenhjelm
- 1831 Barselstuen as Officer
- 1831 Jacob von Tyboe as Jacob von Tyboe
- 1831 Kvaksalverne as Don sebastian
- 1832 Armod og højmodighed as Peter Plum
- 1832 Jacob von Tyboe as Jacob von Tyboe
- 1833 Apothekeren og doctoren as Stødvel, apotekere
- 1835 Barselstuen as Officer
