= 1696 in music =

The year 1696 in music involved some significant events.

== Events ==
- Giacomo Antonio Perti becomes maestro di cappella to S Petronio, Bologna, where he remains for the rest of his life.
- Francesco Antonio Pistocchi becomes maestro di cappella to the Duke of Ansbach.

== Classical music ==
- Henrico Albicastro — Il giardino armonico sacro-profano
- Heinrich Ignaz Franz von Biber — Harmonia artificioso-ariosa
- John Blow — Ode on the Death of Purcell
- Dieterich Buxtehude — VII suonate, op. 2
- Marc-Antoine Charpentier — Ego mater agnitionis, H.371
- Johann Caspar Ferdinand Fischer — Les pièces de clavessin, Op.2
- Johann Kuhnau — Frische Klavierfrüchte
- Isabella Leonarda — Messe e motetti concertate, Op.18
- Nicola Matteis — A Collection of New Songs
- Franz Xaver Murschhauser — Octi-tonium novum organicum, octo tonis ecclesiasticis, ad Psalmos, & magnificat
- Henry Purcell — A Choice Collection of Lessons for the Harpsichord or Spinnet (published posthumously)
- Johann Paul von Westhoff — Six Partitas for solo violin

== Opera ==
- Tomaso Albinoni — Zenone, Imperator d'Oriente
- Giuseppe Aldrovandini — Dafni
- Giovanni Bononcini — Il Trionfo di Camilla
- Sebastián Durón — Salir el amor del mundo
- John Eccles — The Loves of Mars and Venus
- Marin Marais — Ariane et Bacchus
- Bernardo Pasquini — Radamisto
- Daniel Purcell — Brutus of Alba
- Alessandro Scarlatti — La Didone delirante, R.344.30

== Births ==
- February 10 — Johann Melchior Molter, violinist and composer (died 1765)
- February 17 — Ernst Gottlieb Baron, lutenist and composer (died 1760)
- March 21 — Pierre Février, organist, harpsichordist and composer (died 1760)
- May 23 — Johann Caspar Vogler, organist and composer (died 1763)
- August 12 — Maurice Greene, composer (died 1725)
- November 11 — Andrea Zani, violinist and composer (died 1757)
- December 25 — Prince Johann Ernst of Saxe-Weimar, amateur composer (died 1715)
- date unknown
  - Marged ferch Ifan, harpist and wrestler (died 1793)

== Deaths ==
- April 21 — Jacques Gallot, composer
- May 31 — Heinrich Schwemmer, composer and music teacher (born 1621)
- June 29 — Michel Lambert, French composer of airs (born 1610)
- July 25 — Clamor Heinrich Abel, German composer (born 1634)
