= Indian Queens (disambiguation) =

Indian Queens is a village in Cornwall, England.

Indian Queens may also refer to:

- List of Indian monarchs, including queens of India
- "Indian Queens," a song by Nick Lowe from his 2001 album The Convincer
- Stereotype of Indians in the New York City metropolitan region

== See also ==
- Indian Queen (disambiguation)
