= 1695 in music =

The year 1695 in music involved some significant events.

== Events ==
- March 5 – The funeral of Queen Mary II of England takes place, accompanied by music written for the occasion by Henry Purcell.
- Music publisher Henry Playford relocates his London shop to Temple Change.
- John Walsh and John Hare establish themselves as music printers at the "Golden Harp and Hautboy" in Catherine Street, off the Strand in London.
- The orphaned Johann Sebastian Bach is taken in by his cousin Johann Christoph Bach.
- Johann Pachelbel settles in Nuremberg, where he will remain for the rest of his life.

== Published popular music ==
- The Compleat Flute-Master
- Henry Playford's compiled Deliciæ musicæ

== Classical music ==
- Johann Sebastian Bach – Fugue in E minor, BWV 945 (authorship under debate)
- John Blow – An Ode on the Death of Mr. Henry Purcell
- Jean-Baptiste Drouart de Bousset – Airs sérieux et à boire
- Antonio Correa Braga – Batalha de No.6 Tom
- Sébastien de Brossard – Dialogus Poenitentis animae cum Deo
- Juan Cabanilles – Versets, tientos, gallardes, folies, etc., pera orgue
- Andre Campra
  - Motets, Livre 1
  - Motets à voix seule
- Marc-Antoine Charpentier – Lauda Sion, H.268
- Lambert Chaumont
  - Pièces de clavecin
  - Pièces d’orgue sur les 8 tons
- Pascal Collasse – Cantiques spirituels
- Johann Caspar Ferdinand Fischer – Le Journal du Printemps, Op.1
- Francesco Gasparini – Cantate da camera a voce sola, Op.1
- Giuseppe Maria Jacchini – Sonata No.5 in D major
- Johann Friedrich Meister – Il Giardino del Piacere
- Georg Muffat – Florilegium Primum
- Johann Pachelbel
  - Compositionen zumeist Fugen uber das Magnificat
  - Musikalische Ergötzung, vol. 2
- Henry Purcell
  - Who can from Joy Refrain?, Z.342
  - The Knotting Song, Z.371
  - Pausanius, Z.585
  - The Tempest, Z.631 (authorship under debate)
- John Ravenscroft – 12 Trio Sonatas, Op.1
- Jean-Féry Rebel – 12 Trio Sonatas
- Romanus Weichlein – Encaenia musices, Op.1

== Opera ==
- Tomaso Albinoni – Il prodigio dell'innocenza
- Henry Purcell
  - The Indian Queen
  - Bonduca, Z.574

== Theoretical writings ==
- Johan Georg Ahlens musikalisches Frühlings-Gespräche by Johann Georg Ahle, on consonance and dissonance. First part of Ahle's Musikalische Gespräche series of treatises in form of dialogues.
- Historia Musica by Giovanni Andrea Bontempi

== Births ==
- January 6 – Giuseppe Sammartini, oboist and composer (died 1750)
- August 26 – Marie-Anne-Catherine Quinault, singer and composer (died 1793)
- September 3 – Pietro Locatelli, composer (died 1764)

== Deaths ==
- February 24 – Johann Ambrosius Bach, violinist (born 1645)
- April 20 – Georg Caspar Wecker, organist and composer (born 1632)
- November 21 – Henry Purcell, composer (born 1659)
- November 28 – Giovanni Paolo Colonna, composer (born c.1637)
- probable – Cataldo Amodei, Sicilian musician (born c. 1650)
