= Brutus of Alba (opera) =

1696 opera

- Opera by Daniel Purcell
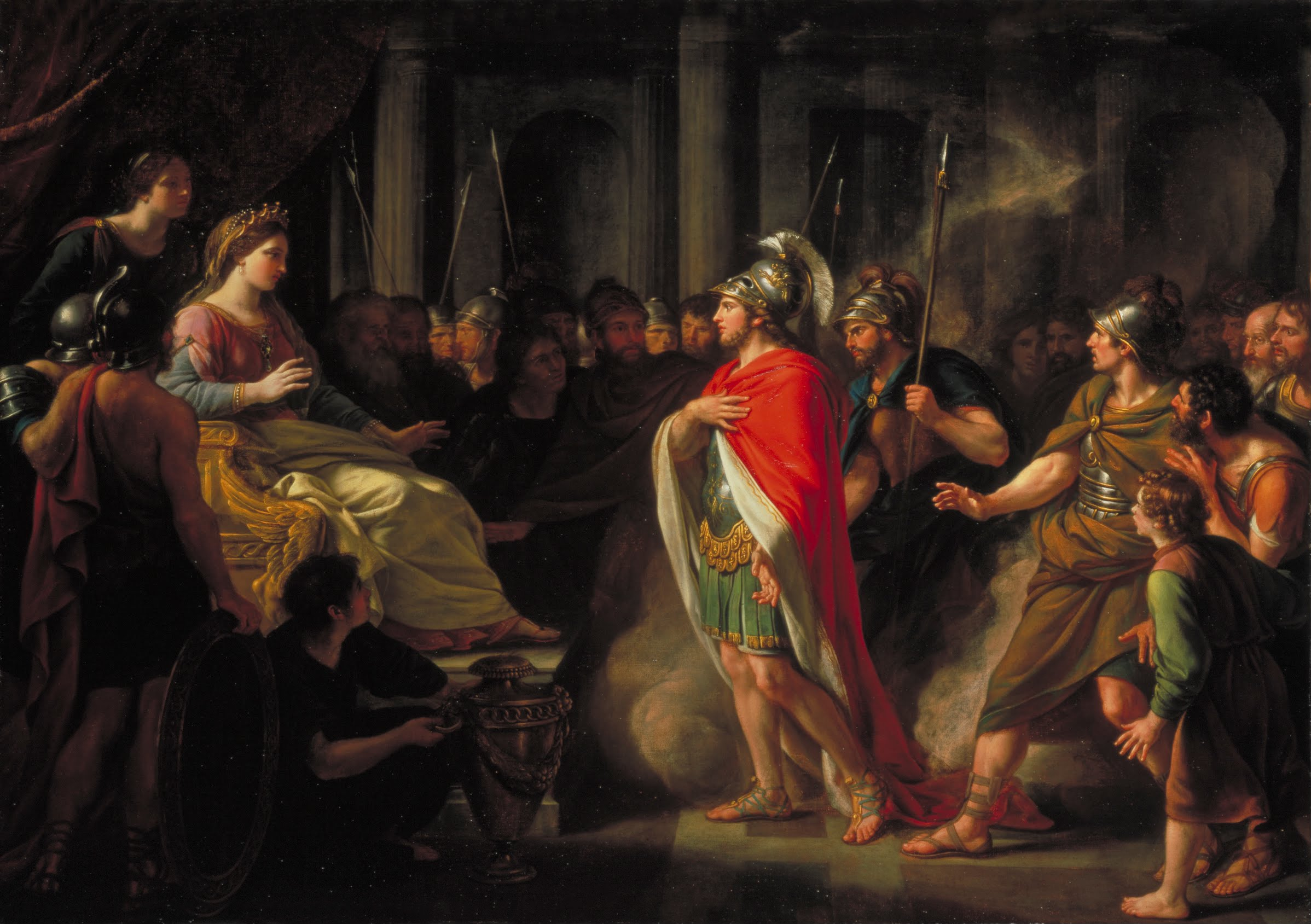
- The Meeting of Dido and Aeneas by Nathaniel Dance-Holland, 1766
- Librettist: George Powell
- Based on: Book IV of Virgil's Aeneid
- Premiere: October 1696; Dorset Garden Theatre, London

Brutus of Alba; Or, Augusta's Triumph is a 1696 semi-opera composed by Daniel Purcell to a libretto by the playwright George Powell. It was first performed at the Dorset Garden Theatre by Christopher Rich's Company. The names of the original cast members are unknown.

The libretto was inspired by the Aeneid by Virgil, the style mingled elements from both Nahum Tate's 1678 play Brutus of Alba and John Dryden's 1685 opera Albion and Albanius concerning the mythical origins of the Ancient Britons. In the wake of the Glorious Revolution and the growing stability of William III's reign, it celebrated the triumph of the Revolution settlement.

== Bibliography ==
- Miner, Earl & Guffey, George R. The Works of John Dryden, Volume XV: Plays: Albion and Albanius, Don Sebastian, Amphitryon. University of California Press, 1976.
- Van Lennep, W. The London Stage, 1660-1800: Volume One, 1660-1700. Southern Illinois University Press, 1960.
