= Johann Christoph Rothe =

- Born: 1653; Rosswein, Meissen, Germany
- Died: June 1700 (aged 46–47) Sondershausen, Germany
- Genre: Baroque
- Occupation: Composer

Johann Christoph Rothe (1653 – 2 June 1700) was a German Baroque composer.

== Biography ==
According to Ernst Ludwig Gerber, the court organist at Sondershausen in the time of Rothe's sons and grandsons, Rothe was born in Rosswein, Meissen, where his father was kapellmeister and who gave him his early training. Though no kapellmeister by the name of Rothe is documented in Rosswein at the period. He initially served as falsettist and violinist in Coburg, then in 1693 entered the court at Sondershausen. He died there.

He is recorded to have composed many passions and Easter compositions, but his only surviving work is a St Matthew Passion (1697), which is the earliest surviving example of the oratorio passion from Central Germany. It is not clear if Rothe was familiar with the precedents by Johann Sebastiani (Königsberg 1672) and Johann Theile (Lübeck 1673). The libretto is taken from the Halberstadt composer Christian Clajus' passion of 1693, no longer extant. Rothe's sons and grandsons continued to serve as musicians at the Sondershausen court.

== Recordings ==
- Matthäus Passion - St Matthew Passion 1697. Bernhard Klapprott, cpo, 2009.
