= Henry Needler =

British musician and music transcriber (1685–1760)

Henry Needler (1685–1760) was a British musician and prolific music transcriber. He joined the Academy of Ancient Music in 1728 (shortly after its founding), and transcribed a number of works of what was then termed "ancient" music from the 16th and 17th centuries that was no longer contemporary. Twenty-six volumes of his manuscripts are in the British Library, among which are six volumes of works by Palestrina.
