= Johann Evangelist Brandl =

German composer and music director (1760–1837)

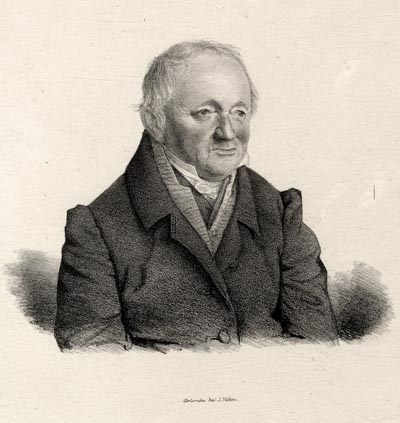

Johann Evangelist Brandl (14 November 1760 – 26 May 1837) was a German composer and music director.

== Life ==
Brandl was born in 1760 in Rohr Abbey, near Regensburg, and studied violin and piano there in his early years. In 1770 he went to a monastery in Munich, where he was a chorister; from 1774 he was educated at a seminary in Neuburg an der Donau. From 1778 he studied composition with R. Schlecht in Eichstätt. In 1779 he entered Holy Cross Monastery, Donauwörth as a novice, but, realizing that he was not suited to monastic life, was soon released.

During the following years he became known for his violin playing and compositions. He was appointed in 1784 as Kapellmeister to Prince Hohenlohe-Bartenstein. From 1789 he was music director for the Bishop of Bruchsal. In 1806 he went to Karlsruhe, where he was music director for the Grand Duke of Baden; he remained until his death in 1837.

== Works ==
He composed an opera Hermann; a monodrama Hero; and many symphonies, serenades, quartets and other works. François-Joseph Fétis described his songs as "remarkable for the beauty of the melodies".
