= Psyche (Locke) =

Psyche is a semi-opera in five acts with music by Matthew Locke to a libretto by Thomas Shadwell with dances by Giovanni Battista Draghi. It was first performed at Dorset Garden Theatre, London on 27 February 1675 by the Duke's Company with choreography the French dancing-master Saint-André. Stage machinery was by Thomas Betterton and the scenery by Stephenson. The work is loosely based on Molière's 1671 tragédie-ballet Psyché with incidental music by Lully, which he would develop into an opera three years after Locke.

== Composition, performance and publication ==
According to Peter Holman, Psyche was "the first semi-opera written from scratch." It has over a dozen musical episodes and requires a large orchestra. Holman believes Locke composed it in response to the visit to Britain of a French opera company under the direction of Robert Cambert, which performed the opera Ariane, ou le mariage de Bacchus at the Drury Lane Theatre in March, 1674. Locke had produced his first semi-opera, The Tempest, in the same year and was eager to follow up its success with Psyche. The set was lavishly staged, with immense sets and machinery to raise and lower actors playing gods and goddesses. Despite the theatre charging treble the price for tickets and the lavish staging, it was not as great a financial triumph. As a contemporary, John Downes, wrote:

The long expected Opera of Psyche came forth in all her Ornaments; new Scenes, new Machines, new Cloaths, new French Dances. This opera was also splendidly set out, especially in Scenes; the Charge of which amounted to some 800l. [i.e. £800]. It had a Continuance of Performance about 8 Days together, it prov'd very beneficial to the Company; yet the Tempest got them more Money.

Locke published his music from both The Tempest and Psyche under the title The English Opera, omitting Draghi's dances. (For his recording of Psyche Philip Pickett orchestrated some harpsichord pieces by Draghi to fill in the gaps resulting from the loss of his original dances.)

== Plot ==
=== Act I ===
Psyche and her ladies enjoy a relaxing retreat from her father's court in a beautiful forest. Pan and the spirits of nature praise Psyche's beauty and crown her queen of the forest. The festivities are interrupted by Ambition, Power, Plenty, and Peace, who tempt her with promises of wealth and authority. Furies and Envy arise from the ground, scaring off Ambition, Power, Plenty, and Peace, and begin tormenting Psyche. The princes Nicander and Polynices attempt to woo Psyche; she is flattered by their advances but rejects them. Psyche's horrible sisters Auglara and Cidippe approach, causing the suitors to flee in disgust. As the princes escape, the jealous sisters call on Venus to curse Psyche. The goddess flies down in a chariot of doves and promises to manipulate the oracle of Apollo to ruin Psyche's fate.

=== Act II ===
The Chief Priest of Apollo enters in a grand procession with King Theander and his followers. The priests engage in a fiery dance and ceremony in Latin and Greek. Apollo appears in a flash of lightning and decrees that Psyche must be deserted on Venus' rock where she will marry a monstrous serpent. Nicander and Polynices argue with the Chief Priest and claim the temple is lying. Despite the princes' attempts to deny the oracle, Psyche submits herself to fate.

On Venus' deadly seaside rock, four tragic lovers appear and lament their lives, committing suicide. A funeral procession takes Psyche to the rock. Though Nicander and Polynices attempt to save her, she refuses to leave and the princes are scared off by demons. Zephyrs carry Psyche away to Cupid's palace.

=== Act III ===
The cyclopes are at work in a forge, hammering silver vases for Cupid's palace. Despite Vulcan's anger, the cyclopes pause to refresh themselves with wine. Psyche is brought in the palace and hears invisible man speaking to her. Cupid reveals himself to her and they instantly fall in love. Psyche misses her two sisters and wishes Zephyr to carry them to Cupid's palace.

In the city, townsfolk celebrate a huge triumph after Nicander and Polynices slew the serpent. They express relief that their women no longer are subjected to the beast and have built a triumphal arch. The Salii pay thanks and prepare to sacrifice a horse to Mars. Despite their prayers, Venus convinces Mars to ruin the ceremony. Mars summons the furies from Hell, who break the altar with firebrands. Nicander and Polynices remain steadfast in their quest to marry Psyche, to the displeasure of Auglara and Cidippe, who were arranged to be married to the princes in their dying father's will. The sisters vow to kill the princes for rejecting them.

=== Act IV ===
Auglara and Cidippe marvel at the beauty of Cupid's garden and are immediately struck by his godlike appearance. Cupid and his attendants entertain Psyche, bringing statues to life and strewing flowers. The sisters convince Psyche that her Cupid is the serpent disguised as a man and attempt to stab her, but are carried away by zephyrs. Cupid quarrels with Psyche and flies off with the garden and palace, abandoning her in a deserted marsh.

Auglara and Cidippe, now queens after King Theander's death, smile at Psyche's despair and summon their soldiers to kill the princes. Psyche contemplates drowning herself, but the river god pleads her not to and strengthens her spirit. Venus descends on her chariot, but Psyche bravely defies the goddess. Nicander and Polynices find Psyche after a long search. Just as they are about to reach her, furies arise and drag Psyche to Hell. The princes are ambushed by the sister's soldiers, they fend them off and jump into the river to follow Psyche into Hell. Cupid retaliates, summoning the furies to punish Auglara and Cidippe, sending them to Hell.

=== Act V ===
In Hell, furies and devils taunt Psyche and relish in torturing the dead. Psyche and her sisters appear before Pluto and Proserpine, who recognize her innocence. They let Psyche free so she can marry Cupid, giving her a present to appease Venus. Auglara and Cidippe are condemned by Minos to draw water with a sieve for eternity. The Elysian ghosts of Nicander and Polynices meet Psyche and encourage her to marry Cupid.

Psyche resurfaces at the marsh. Believing the present will heal her beauty, she opens it and falls into a swoon. Cupid attempts to convince Venus to let him marry Psyche, but she refuses to let her son marry a mortal. Cupid appeals to Jupiter, who offers to grant Psyche godhood. Venus is satsfied and revives Psyche from her swoon. Jupiter takes them to Heaven to be married.

Apollo gathers all of the inhabitants of Heaven to witness Cupid and Psyche's wedding. Elysian lovers, Mars, and Bacchus celebrate the power of love. Jupiter blesses the marriage between love and beauty with eternal happiness.

== Cultural references to Psyche ==
Thomas Duffet parodied the work in his play Psyche Debauch'd, performed at Drury Lane in 1675. It is also mentioned in Dryden's satire on Shadwell, Mac Flecknoe.

== Recordings ==
- Psyche Catherine Bott, Christopher Robson, Paul Agnew, Michael George, New London Consort conducted by Philip Pickett (Decca L'Oiseau-Lyre, 1995)

== Sources ==
- Shirley Strum Kenny (editor) The British Theatre and the Other Arts: 1660-1800 (Associated University Presses, 1984)
- The Viking Opera Guide ed. Amanda Holden (1993)
- Gramophone magazine: review of Pickett's recording by Jonathan Freeman-Attwood (February, 1996)
