= Catharine Frydendahl =

Opera Singer

Catharine Elisabeth Frydendahl (née Møller) (30 November 1760 – 30 November 1831) was a Danish opera singer, and the prima donna of Danish opera in the 18th century.

== Life and career ==
The child of the glovemaker Hans Jacob Möller, she became a student in the singing school at the Royal Danish Theatre in Copenhagen in 1776. She debuted in 1777, and quickly became regarded as one of the greatest talents within Danish opera; it is considered that she and Michael Rosing were prime influences in making it possible to use native actors to play opera seria in Denmark in the 18th century. She was also one of the first Danish singers to give concerts.

Her voice was nevertheless thought to be a great undeveloped talent by experts, a judgement given as late as 1793, on a study trip to Dresden. She was also active as an actor, though she was not considered as good in this field. As a person, she was described as a "difficult diva", who argued with the management and plotted against her colleagues. She had a relationship with General von Eickstedt, who was one of the Theatre's directors, and it was thought that, in 1780, she caused her greatest rival, Caroline Frederikke Müller, to leave Denmark. Indeed, in 1800, she and her husband were placed in jail after a conflict with the Theatre. She retired from the Royal Danish theatre in 1821, and gave her last ever concert in 1823.

Catarine was from 1789 married to the court-violinist Jörgen Berthelsen and 1797 with the actor Jørgen Peter Frydendahl.
