= Albion and Albanius =

1685 opera written by John Dryden

- Opera by Louis Grabu
- Title page, circa 1691
- Librettist: John Dryden
- Language: Early Modern English
- Premiere: 3 June 1685; Dorset Garden Theatre, London

Albion and Albanius is an opera, closely resembling a French tragédie en musique, by Louis Grabu with an English libretto by John Dryden.

The words were written by Dryden in 1680. It was initially intended as a prologue to his opera King Arthur, which he explicitly states in the prologue to that opera. "But some intervening accidents having hitherto deferred the performance of the main design, I proposed to the actors to turn the intended prologue into an entertainment by itself, as you now see it, by adding two acts more to what I had already written." (Dryden's "Preface")

== Performance history ==
The music was written in 1685. After the period of court mourning for the late King and many other delays, the sumptuous production (costing the company over £4000 to mount) had its premiere on Sunday, 3 June, that same year at Dorset Garden Theatre, London. This was "a very unlucky day", observed Downes in Roscius Anglicanus, "being the day the Duke of Monmouth landed in the west: the nation being in a great consternation, it was performed but six times, which not answering half the charge they were at, involved the company very much in debt." This fiasco helps explain the rarity of operas in the 1680s, until Londoners had settled down after the Glorious Revolution of 1689. In addition, events of the reign of James II quickly rendered the adulatory allegory of Dryden's machinery no longer current.

Albion and Albanius is the first all-sung and full-length English opera that still survives, with John Blow's Venus and Adonis being its shorter predecessor by about two years.

== The allegory ==
It was written as a tribute to King Charles II, and after his death was intended to apply to his successor James II.

Based in style on a pre-civil war court masque, "the allegory itself so very obvious that it will no sooner be read than understood", the hero and his supporters in the plot are mythological and Arthurian; they are, however, quite clearly based on the Stuart dynasty, in a thinly veiled allegory. In terms of production, the opera was a restoration spectacular, visuals included much more mythological display to take advantage of the "machines" at the Dorset Garden Theatre, such as "The clouds divide, and Juno appears in a machine drawn by peacocks: while a symphony is playing, it moves gently forward, and as it descends, it opens and discovers the tail of the peacock, which is so large that it almost fills the opening of the stage between scene and scene" (act 1). More pointedly, political allegorizing of the Tory message includes a figure representing Shaftesbury "with Fiend's Wings, and snakes twisted round his body; he is encompassed by several fanatical rebellious heads, who suck poison from him, which runs out of a tap in his side".

== Dryden on opera ==
When Albion and Albanius came to be printed, Dryden's "Preface" was the first explication of opera in the English language. "An opera is a poetical tale, or fiction, represented by vocal and instrumental music, adorned with scenes, machines and dancing", Dryden informed his readers. The "machines" were required to effect the dramatic changes of scenery the action required. Pointing out that the persons were supernatural or heroic, Dryden linked his work with the genre we would call Romance: "The subject, therefore, being extended beyond the limits of human nature, admits of that sort of marvellous and surprising conduct, which is rejected in other plays... it would follow of necessity, that the expressions should be lofty, figurative, and majestical." In this way, at the very birth of opera in London, Dryden gives the character that opera seria retained for a century, as long as the librettos of Metastasio were being set, into the age of Mozart.

In the 17th-century, Italian operas that Dryden admitted were his general models – and the French ones that he did not mention – the recitative drove the action, and the arias – "which for want of a proper English word, I must call the songish part" – were meant to please the ear rather than gratify the understanding.
