= The Indian Queen (play) =

Restoration play by Howard and Dryden

The Indian Queen is a play by Sir Robert Howard, written in collaboration with John Dryden, his sister's husband. It was first performed in 1664 with incidental music by John Banister the elder (1630–1679). In 1665, the play was given a sequel named The Indian Emperour. In 1695, the play was expanded with additional music to create a new semi-opera of the same name by the composer Henry Purcell.

== Background ==
The Indian Queen is a play co-written by John Dryden and Sir Robert Howard, first produced at the Theatre Royal in London in January 1664. Among its early notable spectators were Samuel Pepys and John Evelyn, while it later provoked literary commentary by Samuel Johnson and Sir Walter Scott. Henry Purcell and David Purcell revived The Indian Queen by rewriting and producing a musical or operatic version of the play in 1694.

== Protagonists ==
The plot is set at the courts of Peru and Mexico right before the Spanish invasion. It is difficult to follow due to an information gap which is filled only in the last scenes, and due to changes of location which the reader is likely to miss (here the spectator will have an advantage).

The play's protagonists can be divided into the groups of two countries and their respective royal families:

- the Peruvians: King Ynca and his daughter Orazia
- the Mexicans, who are divided in a family feud between:
  - the now ruling Queen Zempoalla, her general Traxalla, and her son Acacis. With Traxalla's help, Zempoalla has usurped the Mexican throne. Acacis, uncle of the deposed king, is not at all happy about the prospect of becoming the next Mexican king. He remains horrified by his mother's deeds.
  - the legitimate Mexican line of succession still alive with Montezuma, the son of the deposed king, a man of valour, and, at the play's beginning, Peru's successful general. Montezuma has been educated in the woods by Garrucca who has not told him anything about his noble heritage; his background remains unclear right into the play's last scenes in which his mother Amexia appears with Garrucca, both supported by the Mexican people who are now ready to end Zempoalla's reign.

Minor characters include Ismeron, a Mexican prophet and conjuror and the God of Dreams whom Ismeron manages to evoke on Zempoalla's request.

== Synopsis ==
The play begins at Ynca's court. The old king honours his young general Montezuma who has just defeated the Mexicans and caught their prince Acacis. Generously Ynca grants Montezuma personal power over the defeated realm and over Acacis. Montezuma proves his own generosity by setting Acacis free, and he defies the riches he is offered in a show of his own pride and love: he can win any country; it is Ynca's daughter he wants, and all is worth nothing if he does not get her.

The play's central conflict is constructed around Ynca's reluctance to consent to his daughter's marrying Montezuma. Orazia's own feelings remain hidden; she acts the obedient daughter with readiness to follow her father into death on the Mexican altar.

The reversal of affairs – Mexico conquers Peru and captures Ynca and Orazia – takes place between scenes one and two. Montezuma announces at the end of the first scene that he will change sides and support Mexico against Peru. The second scene opens at the Mexican court with Montezuma having just degraded Orazia and her father to Mexican state prisoners.

Montezuma and Acacis have meanwhile become friends. Ynca and his daughter are for the rest of the play the captives of Zempoalla, the Mexican usurper, which does not facilitate the situation. Montezuma remains eager to marry Orazia. The fair captive and her father are now, however, destined to die at Zempoalla's command as human sacrifices on Mexico's altar – Zempoalla has sworn their deaths.

Different interests begin to block each other: Zempoalla wants to see her captives die and falls in love with Montezuma (still in love with Orazia). Her son Acacis has fallen in love with Orazia himself and has to choose between his new friendship with Montezuma and his love for his mother's captive. General Traxalla acts the Machiavellian courtier in between: he has brought Zempoalla onto the throne – a woman who is now about to fall in love with Montezuma the new successful Mexican general. Traxalla himself could try to win Orazia, the royal captive in a power struggle against Zempoalla whose secret thoughts he can reveal in his monologues.

The different conflicts culminate step by step. Acacis has to fight a duel over Orazia with Montezuma. He has realised that neither of the two friends will be happy if he has to see Orazia marrying the other. Orazia ends the fight between her two lovers only when Acacis is already badly wounded and expecting his own death.

The tragedy's final catastrophe is ripe after a dark scene in which Zempoalla has asked for an explanation of her dreams. Dark signs forecast her failure and the re-installation of the legitimate line of succession.

Acacis stabs himself when he realises that Montezuma will win Orazia and furthermore aggravated about his own future prospects as the son of his mother, an unlawful usurper. Traxalla is killed by Montezuma whom he attacks in an attempt to get more power over Orazia. Zempoalla kills herself when the situation is finally resolved by Mexico's people: Amexia and Garrucca turn up, supported by a revolt, and they can stop the execution of Ynca and his daughter.

The old Ynca is moved by all these events and offers Orazia to Montezuma – before Montezuma receives the information that he is actually the heir of the Mexican throne, the very person who can with all justification marry the Peruvian princess.

== Bibliography ==
- Smith, John Harrington (1954). "The Dryden-Howard Collaboration". Studies in Philology. 51 (1): 54–74. JSTOR 4173086.
- Winkler, Amanda Eubanks (2010). "Sexless Spirits? Gender Ideology and Dryden's Musical Magic" (PDF). The Musical Quarterly. 93 (2): 298–328. doi:10.1093/musqtl/gdq010. JSTOR 40783238.
