= Pierre Hugard =

French composer

Pierre Hugard (1726–1761) was a French composer. He is best known for his Missa Redde mihi laetitiam.
