= The Indian Queen (opera) =

Semi-opera by Henry Purcell

- Semi-opera by Henry Purcell
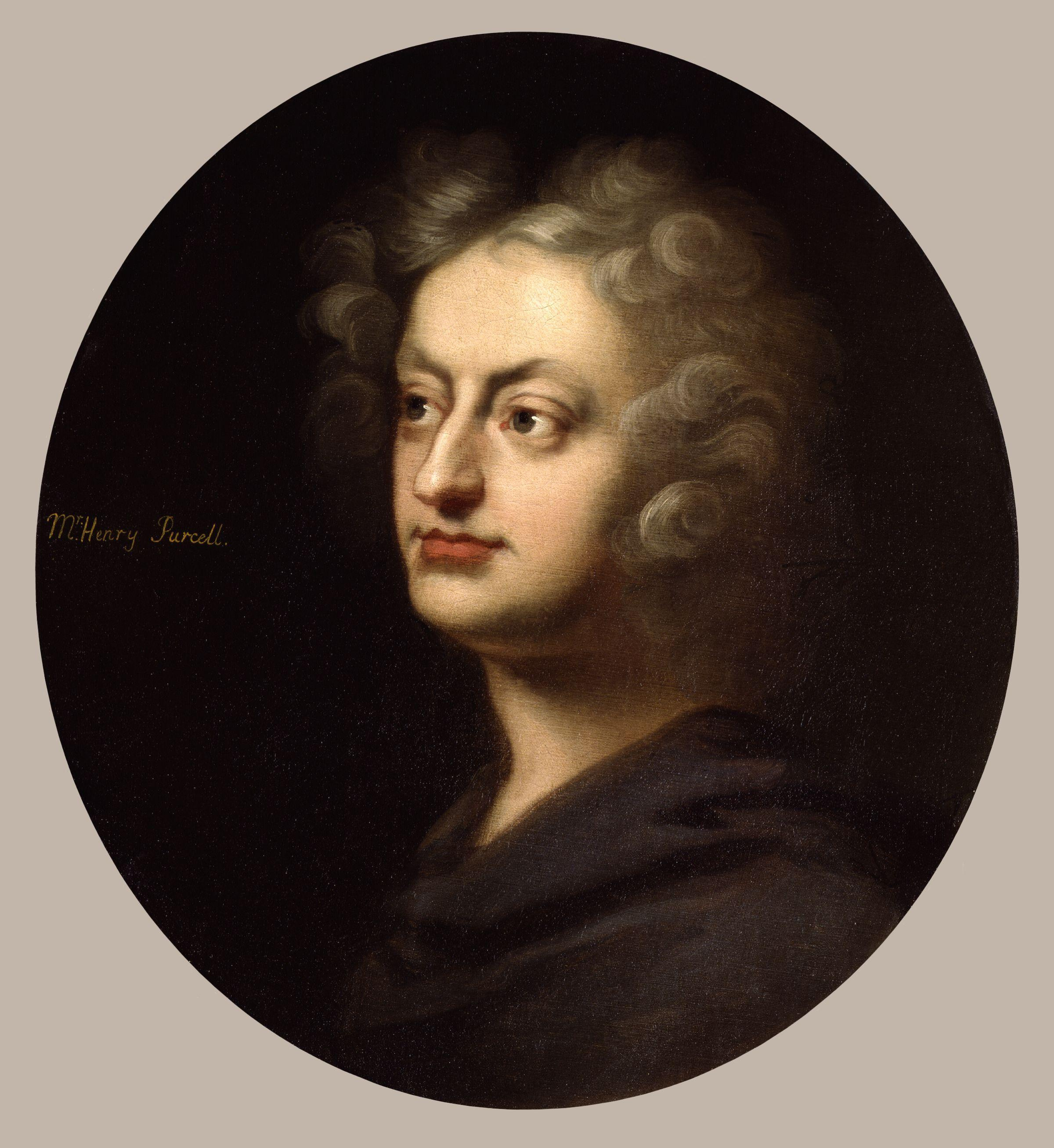
- The composer, portrait by John Closterman, c. 1695
- Based on: The Indian Queen (play) by Sir Robert Howard
- Premiere: 1695; Theatre Royal, Drury Lane, London

The Indian Queen (Z. 630) is a largely unfinished semi-opera with music by Henry Purcell. It was first performed at the Theatre Royal, Drury Lane, London, in 1695. The exact date is unknown, but Peter Holman estimates it may have been in June.

It was created as a revised version of the 1664 play The Indian Queen, in a prologue and five act form by John Dryden and his brother-in-law Sir Robert Howard. In 1694, Thomas Betterton was given £50 to transform the play into an opera, and he commissioned Purcell to compose the music. Purcell, who died in November 1695, left music only for the Prologue and Acts II and III. His brother Daniel completed a masque for Act V.

The Indian Queen is one of Purcell's less often performed stage works. This is probably more a reflection of the incomplete state of the score than of its quality.

== Commission and première ==
The Indian Queen was commissioned by the United Company. The managers, struggling with discontented actors who were threatening to leave, and advised by Lord Chamberlain, a theater monitor, asked Sir Robert Howard to revise his earlier 1664 play with added music by Henry Purcell. Howard however would support the actors to leave before the première, and the actors were successful in doing so, creating their own company. This caused the United Company to première The Indian Queen with amateur actors and to commission additional music from Purcell. The semi-opera would première with some success, but other than a brief revival with added music by Purcell's brother, Daniel, would quickly be forgotten from regular production.

== Sellars' 2013 production ==
The 2013 director Peter Sellars led a production of the Indian Queen with the Tchaikovsky Perm Opera and Ballet Theatre (Perm), Teatro Real (Madrid), and English National Opera (London). Sellars rewrote Howards and Dryden's plot to tell the story of the Spanish Conquista. Sellers drew on a book by the Nicaraguan writer Rosario Aguilar. Stage design was done by American Artist Gronk drawing on Mayan markings. The production received mixed responses from spectators. About these responses Sellars said, “[the spectators] don’t understand that a work like this is about trying to complete a journey together through difficult issues and history.”

== Characters ==
- Indian Boy and Girl
- King Inca
- Zempoalla, queen of the Aztecs
- Montezuma, general of Peru (based on Moctezuma II)
- Orazia, daughter of Inca
- Acacis, prince of the Aztecs
- Traxalla, general of Aztecs
- Hymen (based on Hymen (god))
- Ismeron, an Aztec conjurour
- Amexia, queen of Mexico
- Garucca, high priest
- Envy
- Fame
- God of dreams
- follower of Hymen
- follower of Envy
- follower of Cupid

== Synopsis ==
Some years before the Spanish Conquest in Mesoamerica—a war began between the Inca and the Aztecs.

=== Prologue ===
The prologue opens with two children discussing the Inca conquest of the Aztecs.

=== Act I ===
Montezuma, a young warrior, leads the Inca army in battle capturing Acais, the son of the mexican queen, Zempoalla. For his success Montezuma asks for the hand of Orazia, the princess of the Incas but is refused by King Inca. Acais also falls in love with Orazia, creating a love triangle between the three characters.

Meanwhile, in the Aztec lands Zempoalla believe Acais to be dead. This angers Zempoalla, who declares vengeance on the Incas. In his anger Montezuma joins the Atzec army, who begin to win the war.

=== Act II ===
Zempoalla sends her General Traxalla after Montezuma. Montezuma captures King Inca and Orazia, but the two are quickly stolen from Montezuma by Traxalla. Montezuma and Acias, though rivals, work together to try and save Orazia. Both men are fail however, and are stopped. Montezuma is captured.

These events are commented on by Fame, Envy, and the God of Dreams in song.

=== Act III ===
With Montezuma captured, Zempoalla falls deeply in love with him. This troubles Zempoalla who seeks the aid and advice of Ismeron, a conjuror, the God of Dreams, and the spirits. None of them give Zempoalla aid.

General Traxalla also falls in love with Orazia, further complicating the interpersonal drama.

=== Act IV ===
Zempoalla and Traxalla visiting Montezuma in prison. Zempoalla threatens Traxalla to keep him from killing Montezuma and Zempoalla confesses her love to Montezuma but is refused. Traxalla does the same to Orazia, who refuses him as well. Monzezuma and Orazia choose death over giving their lives to Zempoalla and Traxalla. Zempoalla and Traxalla leave and order Orazia, Montezuma, and King Inca to be ritually sacrificed.

After Zempoalla and Traxalla depart Acias arrives however to remove Orazia. In this conflict Acias challenges Montezuma to a duel over Orazia and Acias is given a fatal wound.

Traxalla and Zempoalla arrive back to the prison with the Aztec army and recapture Montezuma and Orazia. Orazia sings a love song to Montezuma.

=== Act V ===
Priests of the Aztecs arrive at the prison to sacrifice Orazia, Montezuma, and King Inca. During this, Zempoalla watches Acias bleed to death from and breaks down. In her grief Zempoalla tries to kill Montezuma but chooses to cut him free of his bindings instead. Montezuma then kills Traxalla.

In a shocking twist, Amexia arrives and is revealed as the rightful Queen of the Aztecs. Amexia describes all that happens and we learn that Montezuma is actually a prince of the Aztecs and heir to the throne. Zempoalla, now completely distraught, reveals a dagger and stabs herself, taking her own life in grief.

Now satisfied, King Inca gives Montezuma a blessing to marry. (In the 1695 premiere, the bodies of Acias, Traxalla, and Zempoalla are left on stage. In the 1696 production, which the added Masque, the bodies are cleared from the stage.)

=== Masque ===
A masque is held to celebrate the marriage of Montezuma and Orazia.

== Musical numbers ==
- Movt. 1, 1st Music, (Air and Hornpipe)
- Movt. 2, 2nd Music, (Air and Hornpipe)
- Movt. 3, Overture, (Grave and Canzon)
- Prologue
  - Movt. 4a, Trumpet Tune
  - Movt. 4b, Aria, "Wake Quivera, wake"
  - Movt. 4c, Prelude
  - Movt. 4d, Aria, "Why should men quarrel"
- Act 2
  - Movt. 5, Symphony
  - Movt. 6, Aria and Chorus, "I come to sing great Zempoalla's story"
  - Movt. 7, Trio, "What flatt'ring noise is this"
  - Movt. 8, Trumpet tune
  - Movt. 9, Symphony
  - Movt. 10, Dance
  - Movt. 11, 2nd Act Music (Trumpet Tune reprise)
- Act 3
  - Movt. 12, Dance
  - Movt. 13, Aria, "Ye twice ten hundred deities"
  - Movt. 14, Symphony
  - Movt. 15, Aria, "Seek not to know what must not be reveal'd"
  - Movt. 16, Trumpet Overture (Canzon and Adagio)
  - Movt. 17a, Duet and Quartet, "Ah! Ah! How happy are we!"
  - Movt. 17h, Aria, "I attempt from love's sickness to fly"
  - Movt. 18, 3rd Act Tune (Rondeau)
  - Movt. 19, Aria, "They tell us that you mighty powers above"
  - Movt. 20, 4th Act Tune
  - Movt. 21a, Prelude and Chorus, "While thus we bow before your shrine"
  - Movt. 21b, Aria, "You who at the altar stand"
  - Movt. 21c, Prelude
  - Movt. 21d, Chorus, "All dismal sounds thus on these off'rings wait"
  - Movt. 22, Air

== Recordings ==
- The Indian Queen Soloists, St. Anthony Singers, English Chamber Orchestra, conducted by Charles Mackerras (Decca L'Oiseau-Lyre, 1966)
- The Indian Queen Soloists, Deller Singers, King's Musick, conducted by Alfred Deller (Harmonia Mundi)
- The Indian Queen Soloists, Monteverdi Choir, English Baroque Soloists, conducted by John Eliot Gardiner (Erato, 1980)
- The Indian Queen Soloists, Academy of Ancient Music, conducted by Christopher Hogwood (Decca L'Oiseau-Lyre, 1995)
- The Indian Queen Soloists, The Purcell Simfony and the Purcell Simfony Voices (Linn, 1995)
- The Indian Queen Soloists, Scholars' Baroque Ensemble (Naxos, 1998)
- The Indian Queen Soloists, London Chamber Singers, London Chamber Orchestra. conducted by Anthony Bernard (Music Guild MS-124, 196x?)
