= John Downes (prompter) =

English theatre prompter

John Downes (died c. 1712) worked as a prompter at the Duke's Company, and later the United Company, for most of the Restoration period 1660–1700. His "historical review of the stage", Roscius Anglicanus (1708), is an invaluable source for historians both of Restoration and of Stuart theater.

Downes first enters the theatrical record in 1664, when he was registered by the Lord Chamberlain as a member of William Davenant's troupe under the patronage of the Duke of York. By his own admission, stage fright kept him from an acting career, although he is known to have played Haly in The Siege of Rhodes. Later in the 1660s, he is recorded as a member of Thomas Betterton's King's Company; his main work seems to have been as prompter. He continued in this function when the two companies united in 1682; when the companies split in 1694, he remained with Betterton until the middle of the next decade. He is the subject of a number of the Tatler; in this letter from Downes (presumably written by Steele), gives a brief account of Downes's life. He retired around 1706, and may be the John Downes recorded as buried in St Paul's, Covent Garden, in June 1712.

== Roscius Anglicanus ==
Downes wrote his history of the Restoration stage between his retirement and death. It was published in 1708, and has served as a valuable resource ever since. Unlike earlier historians of English theater, such as Gerard Langbaine and James Wright, Downes approached the topic as an experienced insider; his concerns are those of a practical person of business, and he provides information that would otherwise be lost, particularly in the details of theatrical practice. He provides cast lists for countless plays, information on the success or failure of many pieces, and incidental comments on his own preferences. His accuracy is sometimes open to question, particularly as regards casting for often-staged plays. Still, as Sidney Lee notes, his work along with two or three other memoirs, "is practically all to which we have to trust for our knowledge of the Restoration stage."
