= Claudio Casciolini =

Italian composer (1697–1760)

Claudio Casciolini (9 November 1697 – 18 January 1760) was an Italian composer.

== Life ==
The son of Agostino and Veronica Finocchiola, he was born in Rome on November. From April 1726 until his death, he sang as a bass at the church of San Lorenzo in Damaso where he may have also been maestro di cappella. On 14 January 1724, he married Maria Teresa Mazza in the basilica of S. Lorenzo in Damaso; he had numerous children and lived in poverty in a small house near the Piazza della Chiesa Nuova. He was a member of the Congregation of S. Cecilia, for which he wrote various compositions.

== Work ==
Casciolini wrote only church music. Although he lived during what's usually regarded as the late baroque, he wrote exclusively in the stile antico. This consisted of a cappella counterpoint in the style of Palestrina.

== Compositions ==
His compositions include a three-part Missa pro defunctis, and a Missa brevissima.

=== Other works for four voices ===
Venite comedite; Adiuva nos; Responsoria per il Mercoledi, Giovedi, Venerdi Santo; Benedictus; Christus factus est, Vexilla; Christe cum sit; Istorum est; Miserere; O vos omnes; Laude sagra ad honorem et gloriam Domini nostri Jesu Christi; Pange lingua; Stabat Mater; Viam mandatorum.

=== Other works for eight parts ===
Angelus Domini; Beatus vir; Dixit Dominus; Zachee festinans descende.
