= Samuel Akeroyde =

17th century British songwriter

Samuel Akeroyde (also Ackroyd, Ackroyde, Acroyd; fl. 1684-1706) was a popular and prolific composer of songs in the latter part of the 17th century. He was born in Yorkshire. He wrote more than 100 songs.

Many of his compositions are contained in collections of the period, including: Thomas d'Urfey's Third Collection of Songs (1685); The Theatre of Musick (1685-1687); Vinculum Societatis (1687); Comes Amoris (1687-1694); The Banquet of Musick (1688-1692); Thesaurus Musicus (1693-1696); and in The Gentleman's Journal (1692-1694). He was also a contributor to the Third Part of D'Urfey's Don Quixote (1696).
