= Daniel Purcell =

English composer; relative of Henry Purcell

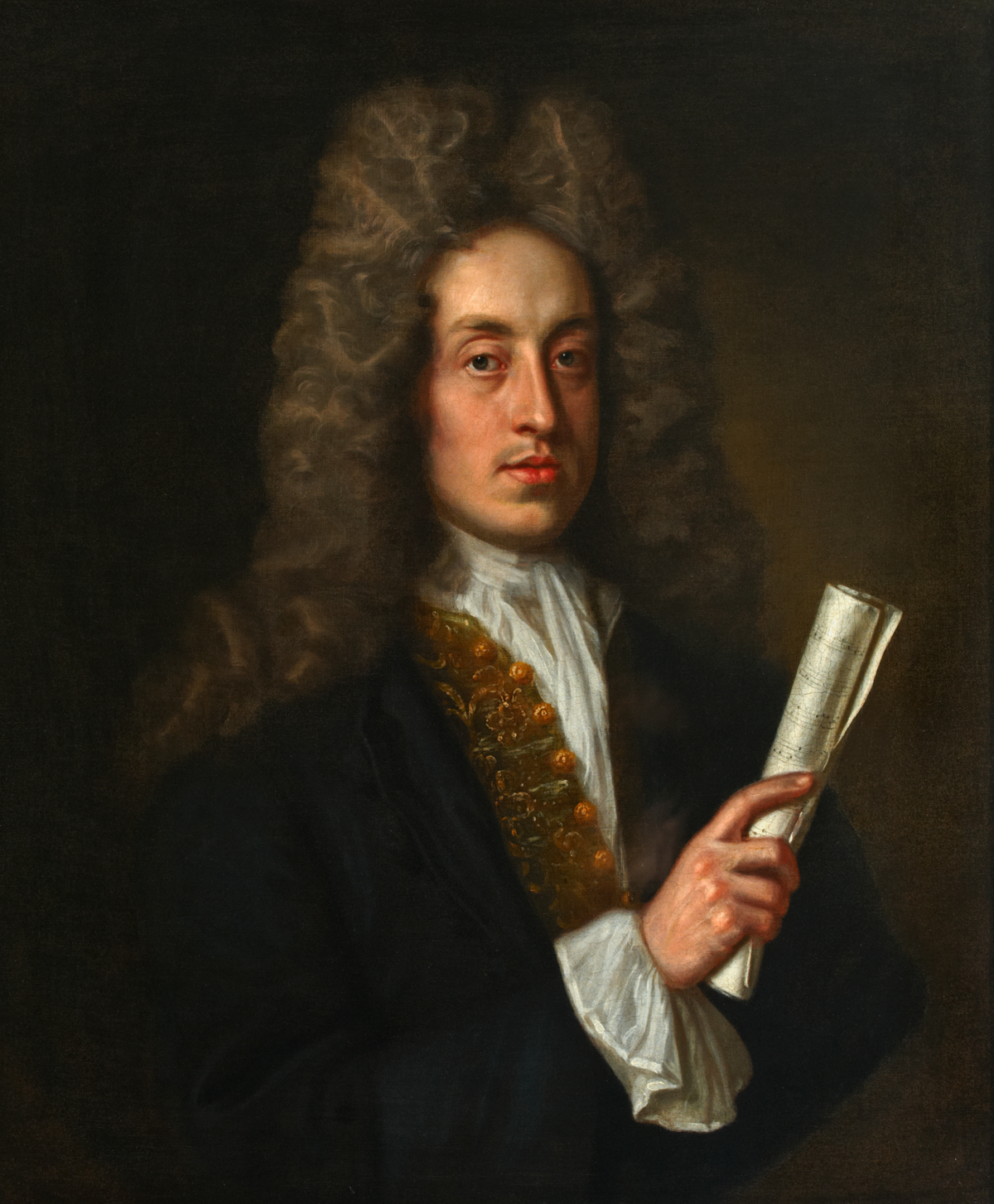
Daniel Purcell

Daniel Purcell (c. 1664 – buried 26 November 1717) was an English Baroque composer, the younger brother or cousin of Henry Purcell.

== Biography ==
Like Henry Purcell before him, Daniel Purcell joined the choir of the Chapel Royal at about the age of 14. In his mid-twenties he was appointed organist of Magdalen College, Oxford where he began to compose. In 1695 he moved to London to compose for the theatre providing incidental music for more than 40 plays. One of his first engagements was to complete the concluding Masque for Act V of the semi-opera The Indian Queen, the preceding music for which had been written by Henry Purcell during the early months of 1695. It is unclear whether Daniel Purcell had been engaged because of pressure to complete the score in time for the first performance or as a result of Henry Purcell's failing health and subsequent death. The performance history of the piece is uncertain, and the first performance may have gone ahead without Daniel Purcell's contribution.

In 1696 he composed the score for the semi-opera Brutus of Alba to a libretto by George Powell. In 1701, he came third in a competition for the best musical setting of William Congreve's masque, The Judgment of Paris. His instrumental compositions published c.1710 included sets of sonatas and trio sonatas for recorder in addition to works for violin. In 1713, at the age of 49 he was appointed organist of St Andrew's, Holborn, a position he held until his death. He was subsequently buried in St Andrew's Church where he had worked.

The most frequently performed of his compositions are probably the Magnificat and Nunc dimittis in E minor, liturgical pieces written for use in the Church of England service of Evensong.
