= Venice Preserv'd =

English Restoration play written by Thomas Otway

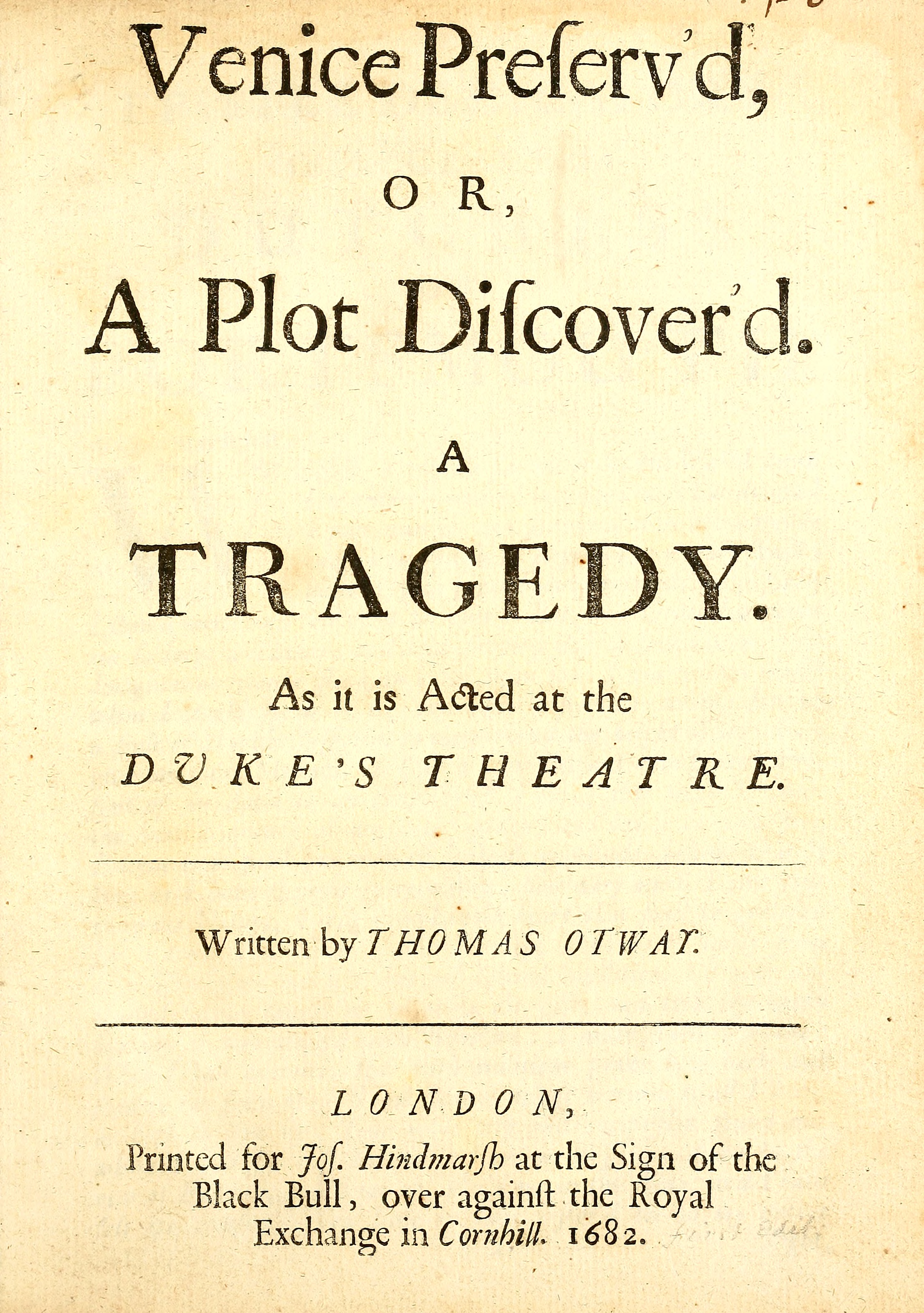
First edition title page

Venice Preserv'd is an English Restoration play written by Thomas Otway, and the most significant tragedy of the English stage in the 1680s. It was first staged in 1682, with Thomas Betterton as Jaffeir and Elizabeth Barry as Belvidera. The play was soon printed and enjoyed many revivals through to the 1830s. In 2019, the Royal Shakespeare Company staged a modern adaptation, Venice Preserved, at the Swan Theatre, Stratford-upon-Avon.

== Plot ==
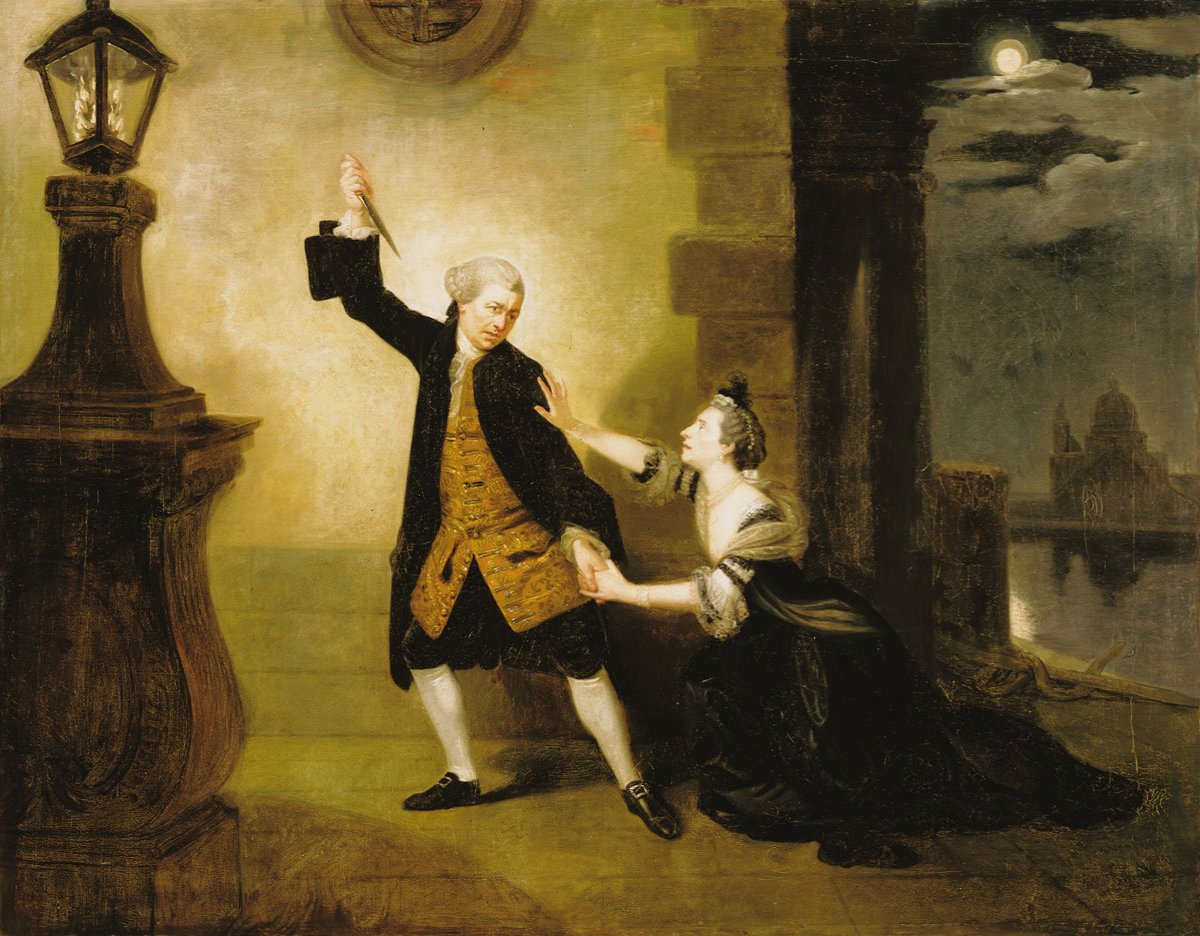
Venice Preserv'd by Johan Zoffany, 1763. Jaffeir and Belvidera as portrayed by David Garrick and Susannah Cibber

Jaffeir, a noble but impoverished Venetian, has secretly married Belvidera, the daughter of a proud senator named Priuli, who has cut off her inheritance. Jaffeir's friend Pierre, a foreign soldier, stokes Jaffeir's resentment and entices him into a plot against the Senate of Venice. Pierre's own reasons for plotting against the Senate revolve around another senator (the corrupt, foolish Antonio) paying for relations with Pierre's mistress, Aquilina. Despite Pierre's complaints, the Senate does nothing about it, explaining that Antonio has senatorial privilege.

Pierre introduces Jaffeir to the conspirators, led by bloodthirsty Renault. To get their trust, Jaffeir must put Belvidera in Renault's care as a hostage. That night, Renault attempts to rape Belvidera, but she escapes to Jaffeir. Jaffeir then tells Belvidera about the plot against the Senate. She devises a plan of her own: Jaffeir will reveal the conspiracy to the Senate and claim the lives of the conspirators as his reward. (Jaffeir would then choose to pardon some or all of the conspirators, notably his friend Pierre.)

Jaffeir follows Belvidera's plan, but when the Senate gives the conspirators the choice between confession (and the possibility of pardon) and death, they choose to die rather than sacrifice their pride. In remorse for betraying Pierre and losing his honor, Jaffeir threatens to kill Belvidera, unless she can obtain a pardon for the conspirators. She does so, but the pardon arrives too late. Jaffeir visits Pierre before his execution. Pierre is crestfallen because he is sentenced to die a dishonourable death by hanging, not the death of a soldier. He forgives Jaffeir and whispers to him (unheard by the audience) to kill him honourably before he is executed. Just as Pierre is about to be hanged, Jaffeir rushes up to the gallows and stabs him; as a form of atonement, he then commits suicide. Belvidera then goes insane and dies.

== Main characters ==
Eliza O'Neill as Belvidera by Arthur William Devis, 1816

=== Antonio ===
Antonio is a corrupt senator who is sexually involved with the courtesan Aquilina: in the prologue of Venice Preserv’d, Otway describes Antonio as “a Senator that keeps a whore/ In Venice none of a higher office bore. / To lewdness every night the lecher ran;/ Show me, all London, such another man, /”. Otway's invitation to find a “such another man” has allowed several critics to connect Senator Antonio with Anthony Ashley Cooper, 1st Earl of Shaftesbury, who was a Whig politician.

Antonio's key scene in Venice Preserv’d is the "Nicky Nacky" scene where Antonio attempts foreplay with Aquilina by pretending to be a bull, a toad, and a dog. According to Derek H. Hughes, Antonio's relationship with Aquilina mirrors other relationships in the play by portraying prostitution, submission, and self-abasement, which can be subtly seen in the relationships between Renault and Belvidera, Jaffeir and Pierre, and Jaffeir and Belvidera.

=== Aquilina ===
Aquilina is a courtesan who is romantically involved with Pierre and sexually involved with the senator Antonio. Aquilina allows Pierre to meet with the conspirators in her home (II.i.48.) Aquilina appears in the play three times: Act II, Act III, and Act V (8). When the Lyric Theatre performed Venice Preserv’d in 1920, Edith Evans performed as a successful Aquilina. Aquilina was played by Stephanie Beacham at the Lyttelton Theatre in 1984.

=== Belvidera ===
Belvidera is a noblewoman who is the daughter of Priuli and the wife of Jaffeir. “Belvidera is affectionate, constant, and pure” character who remains faithful to Jaffeir and gains pardon for the conspirators who were plotting to murder her father (1). According to Derek Hughes, Belvidera is a complex character; sometimes Belvidera is an admirable character, particularly in comparison to those who surround her. When Jaffeir tells Belvidera of the plot to destroy the senate, she recognises the corruption of the senate, but does not condone the plan of the conspirators (4): she says to Jaffeir, “Can thy great heart descend so vilely low, / Mix with hired slaves, bravoes, and common/ stabbers,… and take a ruffian's wages/ To cut the throats of wretches as they sleep?” (8). Her argument persuades Jaffeir to not partake in the conspirators’ plan, but to instead turn them in to the senate.

On the other hand, Derek Hughes also says, “Belvidera is not different in kind from the other characters. She is the highest product of the world of Venice Preserv’d, but she is of that world to the very end” (4). Belvidera is also resourceful and cunning when it comes to getting what she wants. Belvidera persuades Jaffeir to discontinue his association with the conspirators by telling him of Renault's assault towards her (III. ii. 181.) Belvidera calls upon the memories of her dead mother to convince her father to pardon the conspirators (Otway V. i. 44.)

Venice Preserv'd’s first performance was at the Duke's Theatre on 9 February 1682, with Elizabeth Barry as Belvidera. In 1782 at the Drury Lane Theatre, Sarah Siddons played the role of Belvidera; two years later, Siddons was Belvidera at the Covenant Garden (5). The Lyric Theatre in London filled the role of Belvidera with Cathleen Nesbitt in 1920. Barbara Leigh-Hunt played Belvidera in 1970 at Prospect Productions’ production of Venice Preserv’d. Jane Lapotaire was Belvidera in Lyttelton Theatre's production of Venice Preserv’d in 1984. In 2019, Jodie McNee played Belvidera at the RSC.

=== Jaffeir ===
Jaffeir is the husband of Belvidera, the son-in-law of Priuli, and the friend of Pierre.

Jaffeir is the tragic hero in Venice Preserv’d: he is expected to fulfill the roles of husband, friend, and activist. According to Michael DePorte, “Most readers seldom, if ever, admire Jaffeir for anything, they can sympathize with him only as a man torn on the horns of a terrible dilemma;” that dilemma being his divided loyalties between Belvidera and Pierre (1). Because of his friendship with Pierre, Jaffeir gives his loyalty to Pierre and the conspirators, but because of his love for Belvidera he betrays Pierre and the conspirators.

According to Bywaters, Jaffeir can be easily compared with the Popish betrayer Titus Oates due to the proximity of the Popish Plot with the production of Venice Preserv’d, as well as the Catholic terminology that Pierre uses in reference to Jaffeir (2). The religious tones in Venice Preserv’d allows Bettie Proffitt, in her article concerning religious symbolism in Venice Preserv’d, to compare Jaffeir with Adam.

For the opening showing of Venice Preserv’d on 9 February 1682 at the Duke's Theatre, William Smith played the character of Jaffeir. In 1782 John Kemble was Jaffeir. In London in 1953, John Gielgud filled the role of Jaffeir. Alan Bates was Jaffeir in 1969 at The Bristol Old Vic's production of Venice Preserv’d. More recently, John Castle was Jaffeir in 1970 during the Prospects Productions’ of Venice Preserv’d. (6) in 1984 Michael Pennington was Jaffeir (6). In 2019, Michael Grady-Hall played Jaffeir at the RSC.

=== Pierre ===
Pierre is the friend of Jaffeir, the lover of Aquilina, and a conspirator against the senate, as well as a soldier for Venice.

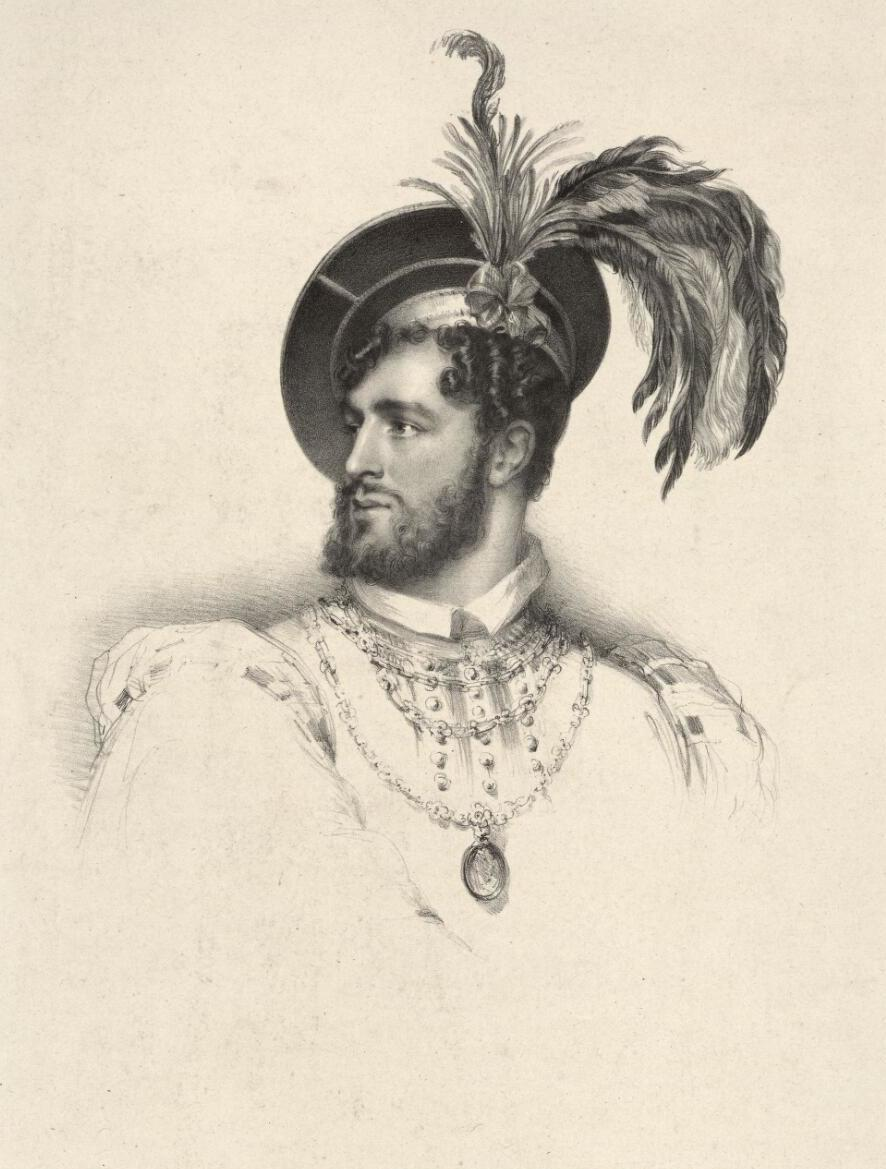
Pierre as portrayed by Charles Kemble

Pierre discovers that while he has been away (presumably at war) Senator Antonio has been sexually involved with his mistress Aquilina. Pierre brings this matter before the senate hoping for justice, but the senate excuses Antonio's behaviour as a privilege entitled to the senators (I. i. 206–217). This situation is what causes Pierre to become involved with the conspiracy against the State.

Pierre is the primary voice for the conspirators and delivers many eloquent speeches throughout the play. Pierre has little difficulty in recruiting Jaffeir to the plot against the senate because of his ability to transform Jaffeir's need for revenge against Priuli into a need for revenge against the corrupt senate (3)

Even though Pierre manipulates Jaffeir, Pierre is a loyal and devoted friend to Jaffeir (1). When Pierre presents Jaffeir to the conspirators, he says, “I’ve brought my All into the publick Stock, / I had but one Friend, and him I’ll share amongst you!” (II. 310–11) Not only faithful to Jaffeir, Pierre is also faithful to his cause with the conspirators until the very end.

Because of Pierre's political jargon, several of his speeches have been censored over the years. Bywaters believes that Venice Preserv’d is an attack on the Whig party and that Pierre's speeches are the primary vehicle for those attacks: “and Pierre’s accusation of a ‘new Tyranny’... turns the Whigs’ rhetoric of tyranny and arbitrary power against them." Pierre’s charismatic speeches encourage such a passionate response from the audience that The Times wrote, “the audience seemed enraptured with every development of rebel villainy." After an assassination attempt on George III, the performance of Venice Preserv’d that evening nearly caused a riot which caused the further performances to be cancelled. Venice Preserv’d was not seen in London for seven years until it returned in 1802; however, Pierre's part was censored and lacking its idealism.

At the Duke's Theatre in 1682, Pierre was performed by Thomas Betterton. In 1802 George Frederick Cooke played the role of Pierre. In London in 1920 at the Lyric Theatre, Baliol Holloway was Pierre. In 1953, Pierre was played by Paul Scofield. In the Prospect Production in 1970, Julian Glover was Pierre. (6) in 1984, Ian McKellen played Pierre at the Lyttelton Theatre. In 2019, Stephen Fewell played Pierre at the RSC.

=== Priuli ===
Priuli is the father of Belvidera and a senator of Venice. According to DePort, Priuli is a complex character because of the mixed signals he gives concerning Belvidera (1). Priuli calls Belvidera his “age's darling” who is “all that his heart holds dear,” but according to Jaffeir, Priuli protects himself before taking care of Belvidera: “Your unskilled pilot/ Dashed us upon a rock, when to your boat/ You made for safety, entered first yourself” (I. i. 36.). Priuli disowns his only child when she chooses and marries a man without her father's permission (8). In 1984, Brewster Mason played Priuli at the Lyttelton Theatre.

== Context ==
The play contains a number of political parallels. The character of Senator Antonio is a reference to Shaftesbury, and the grand plot resembles the Gunpowder Plot, among others. It alludes to the alleged Bedmar Conspiracy against Venice of 1618, around the Marquess of Bedmar and the Duke of Osuna. The subtext clear to contemporaries was the parallel with the Exclusion Crisis (see, for example, Dryden's Absalom and Achitophel).

Venice Preserv'd also has several feminist issues. As the play was written in the Restoration period, when the legal protections for women were few, the emotional heart of the play is the vulnerability of women. Aquillina, the play's courtesan, is shown very little regard by the men in the play. Her lover, Pierre, refuses to reveal the plot against the Senate to her, suggesting that women shouldn't talk out of bed, and Antonio never calls her by her name, but refers to her only as his "little Nacky" (a slang term for a woman's genitalia). Belvidera is reduced to collateral when she is left in the hands of men her husband barely knows. Jaffeir's honour takes precedence over Belvidera, and the tension over love and honour is the male characters' crisis. At the end of the play, Jaffeir chooses his devotion to his friend over his devotion to his wife, and the two men die honourably, whereas Belvidera is left to die an inglorious death resulting from her madness. Contemporary theatre-goers were sensitive to the tragic tension between the public and private obligations of the characters.

Venice Preserv'd was one of the first of the she-tragedy plays. Contemporary audiences responded to the pathos of the character of Belvidera, which was written for the tragedienne Elizabeth Barry and capitalised on Barry's phenomenal success in the role of the similarly helpless Monimia in Otway's The Orphan (1680). Of all of the characters, Belvidera is the most powerless in the face of overwhelming social and political turmoil. Each of the characters has a conflict between the social and personal laws of class and self. Belvidera has to struggle against duty to her father and to love. Jaffeir has to struggle against "honour" and love, as well as friendship and ideals. Priuli must decide between love of daughter and personal pride. Belvidera remained a starring role for actresses because her tragic situation was most affecting for audiences.

== Success of the play ==
Otway was the toast of London after Venice Preserv'd, and yet the financial situation of the theatre meant that he did not grow wealthy from his work. In 1692, Robert Gould (To Julian, Secretary of the Muses) wrote, "Otway, though very fat, starves." While Venice Preserv'd has not survived to the twenty-first century as a byword for tragedy, it was one of the best-known and most important of English tragedies for over 100 years.

On 10 April 1865, John Wilkes Booth told Louis J. Weichmann that he was done with the stage and that the only play he wanted to present henceforth was Venice Preserv'd. Although Weichmann did not understand the reference at the time, it was later assumed to be a veiled allusion to the plot to assassinate Abraham Lincoln.
