= Carlos, Prince of Asturias =

Heir apparent to Philip II of Spain (1545–1568)

Carlos
- Prince of Asturias
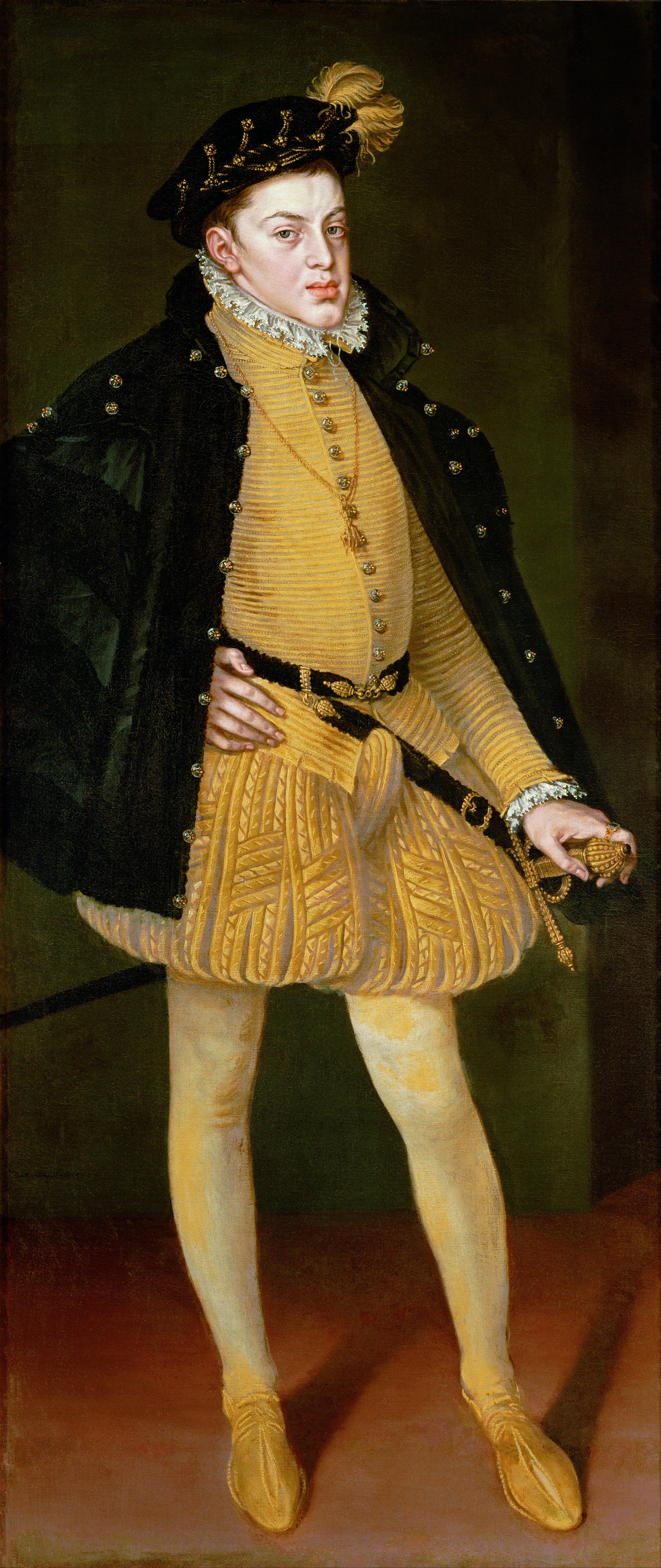
- Portrait by Alonso Sánchez Coello, 1564
- Born: 8 July 1545; Valladolid, Crown of Castile
- Died: 24 July 1568 (aged 23); Madrid, Crown of Castile
- Burial: El Escorial
- House: Habsburg
- Father: Philip II of Spain
- Mother: Maria Manuela, Princess of Portugal

Don Carlos, Prince of Asturias (8 July 1545 – 24 July 1568), was the eldest son and heir apparent of King Philip II of Spain. His mother was Maria Manuela of Portugal, daughter of John III of Portugal. Carlos was known to be mentally unstable and was imprisoned by his father in early 1568, dying after half a year of solitary confinement. His imprisonment and death were utilized in Spain's Black Legend. His life inspired the play Don Carlos by Friedrich Schiller and the opera Don Carlos by Giuseppe Verdi.

== Life ==
Carlos was born in Valladolid, Spain, on 8 July 1545 to double first cousins Philip of Spain and María Manuela of Portugal. His paternal grandfather, Emperor Charles V, was the reigning king of Spain. Carlos's mother, Maria, died four days after the birth of her son from a hemorrhage she had following the birth.

Carlos was born with unequal leg length and lordosis, resulting in asymmetrical shoulders and stance. His physical abnormalities and behavioral issues are often attributed to inbreeding, as he was a member of the House of Habsburg and the House of Aviz. (Note: The extent to which inbreeding contributed to Carlos's poor health, as well as that of other members within the Habsburg and Aviz families, remains ambiguous and subject to debate.) Carlos had only four great-grandparents (one of whom was likely mentally unstable herself, Joanna of Castile, a.k.a. Joanna the Mad) instead of the typical eight, and his parents had a coefficient of relationship of 25%, the same as if they had been half-siblings. He also had only six great-great-grandparents, instead of the maximum 16; his maternal grandmother and paternal grandfather were siblings, his maternal grandfather and paternal grandmother were siblings, and his two great-grandmothers were sisters.

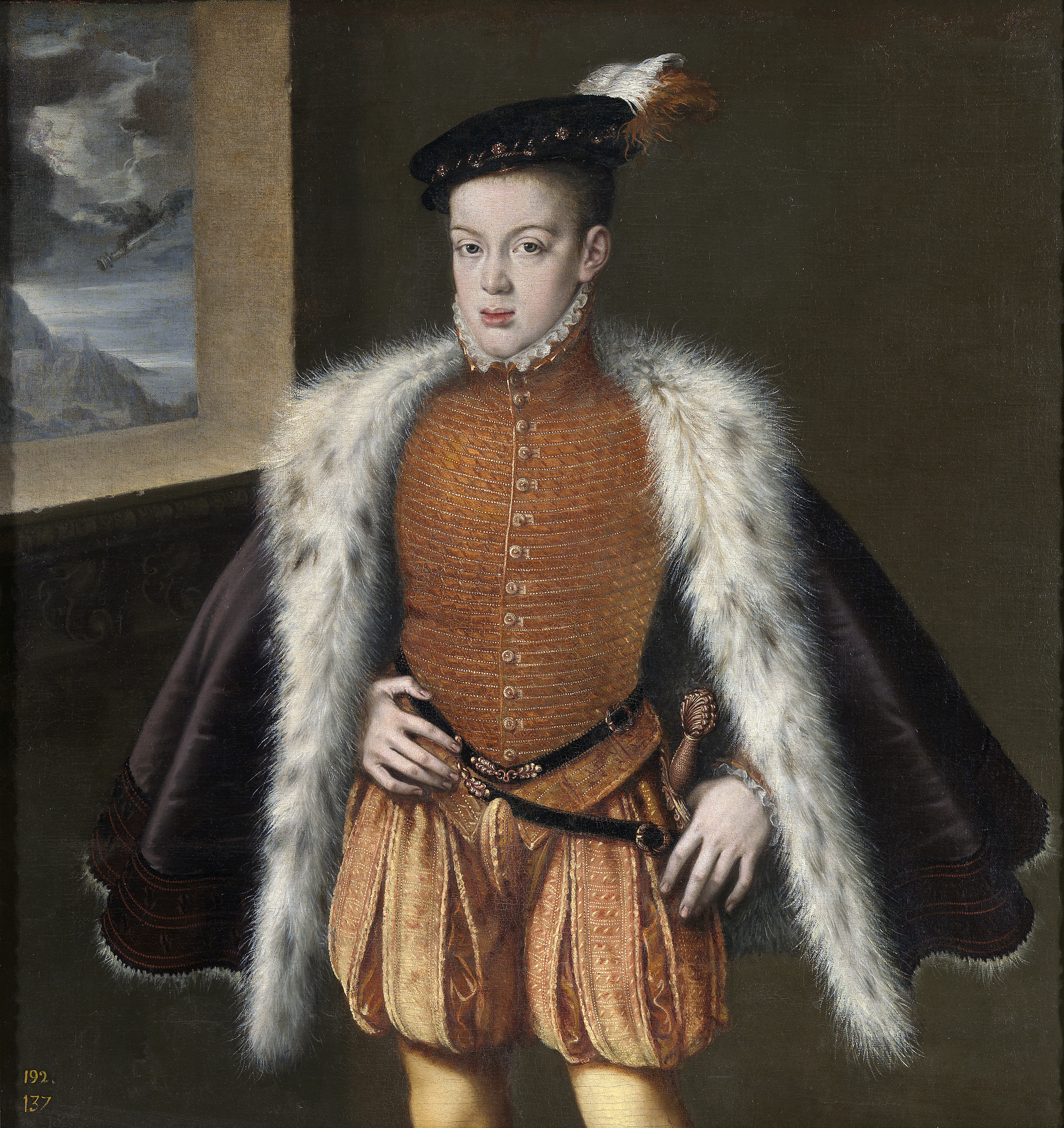
Portrait of Don Carlos by Alonso Sánchez Coello, 1560

=== Early years ===
Following the death of his mother, Carlos was raised by his paternal aunts, Maria and Joanna, until their marriages in 1548 and 1552. His childhood was "emotionally deprived." Philip II spent long periods abroad and, after Joanna's departure, Carlos endured a marked lack of affection. According to the courtier Gamiz, Carlos was spoiled and prone to tantrums. At some point, Philip appointed Honorato Juan as the prince's tutor, and later García Álvarez de Toledo y Osorio.

Carlos began exhibiting violent behavior at a young age, often directing his aggression towards servants and animals. He reportedly once tried to force a shoemaker to eat shoes that he found unsatisfactory. His conduct and character gained notoriety at court, drawing the attention of foreign ambassadors. The Venetian ambassador, Girolamo Soranzo, thought Carlos was "ugly and repulsive." Another Venetian, Paolo Tiepolo, wrote: "He [Prince Carlos] wished neither to study nor to take physical exercise, but only to harm others." It is unclear whether he had any intellectual disabilities.

In 1556, Emperor Charles V abdicated and retired to the Monastery of Yuste in southern Spain, leaving the Spanish holdings of his empire to Philip, Carlos's father. While en route to Yuste, the Emperor paused at Valladolid and met his grandson. Perceived as reckless and ill-mannered, Carlos left a poor impression. Charles was so displeased with the prince that he cautioned Philip against bringing him to Flanders for the homage ceremony from the states. In turn, the prince was fond of his grandfather and improved greatly his behavior during the time they passed together in an attempt to please him. Charles' death late into the year had a devastating effect on Carlos, who found himself without the only adult influence he respected.

In 1559, Carlos became engaged to Elizabeth of Valois, the eldest daughter of King Henry II of France. However, to hasten the reconciliation between Spain and France, Elizabeth married Philip instead. Three other brides were then suggested for the Prince: Mary, Queen of Scots; Margaret of Valois, youngest daughter of Henry II of France; and Anna of Austria, who was a daughter of Philip's cousin, Emperor Maximilian II and Philip's sister Maria. Although it was agreed in 1564 that Carlos should marry Anna, the marriage was continually postponed by Philip, much to Carlos's frustration. Anna would later become Philip's fourth wife.

Beginning in 1560, Carlos suffered recurrent feverish attacks, suspected to be caused by malaria. For the sake of his health, court physicians advised that the prince be moved to Alcalá de Henares. In 1561, Philip arranged for Carlos to be educated in the Universidad de Alcalá de Henares alongside his uncle, Juan of Austria, and cousin, Alexander Farnese.

=== Inheritance and head injury ===
The 15-year-old Carlos was recognised in 1560 as the heir apparent to the Castilian throne, and three years later as heir apparent to the Crown of Aragon. He was also heir presumptive to the throne of Portugal as a paternal cousin of King Sebastian. Because of his eminence, he often attended meetings of the Council of State (which dealt with foreign affairs) and corresponded with his aunt Margaret, who governed the Low Countries in his father's name.

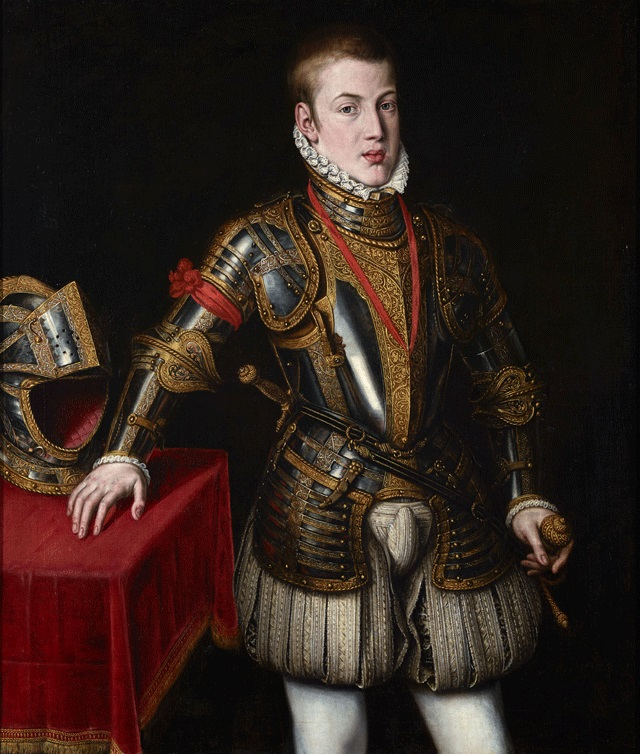
Portrait of Don Carlos by Jooris van der Straeten

In April 1562, while at the University of Alcalá, Carlos sustained a severe head injury after falling down a staircase. Initially deemed non-threatening, his condition rapidly deteriorated; within ten days, he was experiencing delusions and excruciating pain. Fearing for his son's life, Philip sought various remedies, consulting numerous physicians and resorting to placing the relics of Diego de Alcalá by the prince's bedside. By late May, Carlos's condition began to improve. While Philip credited the miraculous power of the Franciscan corpse, modern historians attribute the prince's recovery to either a trepanation of the skull performed by the anatomist Andreas Vesalius or the application of ointments by a Moorish doctor. After his recovery, Carlos became even wilder, more unstable in his temper and unpredictable in his behaviour.

=== Insanity ===
Allegedly, Carlos sympathized with Flemish rebels and contacted representatives of Count Egmont and Floris of Montmorency, leaders of the revolt against Philip in the Low Countries. There were purported plans of fleeing to the Netherlands and declaring himself king, with the support of the rebels. While it is known that Carlos harbored a strong desire to go to the Netherlands, most historians have dismissed the theory that he was involved with Flemish insurgents.

Throughout 1567, Carlos exhibited escalating emotional instability, marked by violent episodes. One notable incident involved his command to set a house on fire after he was accidentally splashed with water thrown from a window of the house.

Carlos often complained about his father's resistance to giving him positions of authority. Hoping to placate his son by increasing his sense of responsibility, Philip appointed Carlos president of the Council of State in 1567. However, the prince showed no interest in the Council or in familiarizing himself with political matters.

Although he initially promised Carlos rule over the Low Countries in 1559, Philip realized his son's inability to be trusted with positions of power. Consequently, instead of fulfilling his promise, Philip granted the position of Governor of the Netherlands to the Duke of Alba. Outraged at being robbed of his position, Carlos attempted to attack the duke but was quickly restrained.

In the autumn of 1567, he made another attempt to flee to the Netherlands by asking John of Austria to take him to Italy. John asked for 24 hours to decide, during which he revealed Carlos's plan to Phillip, who immediately denied permission for the trip.

After being denied, Carlos attempted to shoot John of Austria. A servant had unloaded Carlos's gun while he lured John into his room. After Carlos discovered his gun was unloaded, he attacked John with his bare hands. After hearing about the attack, Philip ordered that Carlos be confined in his room without contact with the outside world.

Just before midnight on 17 January 1568, Philip II, in armour, and with four councillors, entered Don Carlos' bedchamber in the Alcázar of Madrid, where they declared his arrest, seized his papers and weapons, and nailed up the windows. Carlos threatened to commit suicide, which then caused him to be banned from having sharp objects like knives or forks in his room.

=== Death ===
In addressing public opinion and other European courts, Philip attempted to justify Carlos's imprisonment without revealing the prince's actual transgressions or mental state. This absence of transparency fueled widespread speculation that Philip's enemies would later weaponize. (Note: Notably, rumors circulated in France and Flanders that Carlos was imprisoned for being a Protestant. For decades after his death, northern European literature depicted the prince as persecuted by Philip II and the Inquisition for rejecting Church doctrines. However, most evidence suggests that Carlos was a devout Catholic.) By July, Carlos's hunger strikes left him in an "appallingly thin" state. On 24 July 1568, the prince died in his room, possibly as a result of starvation. His death was used as one of the core elements of the Spanish Black Legend in the Netherlands, which needed to justify a revolt against the king, which subsequently caused the Eighty Years' War. It was later claimed that he was murdered by poison on the orders of King Philip, especially by William the Silent in his Apology, a 1581 propaganda work against the Spanish king. The idea of poisoning was held by central and northern European historians, based on the propaganda produced in the Netherlands, until the 20th century. In contrast, most Spanish and Italian historians kept claiming that evidence and documentation pointed to a death by natural causes.

== Legend and literature ==
His coat of arms as the Prince of Asturias (1560–1568).

Don Carlos is also portrayed in the novel "The Spanish Bridegroom" by English author Jean Plaidy, where the delusional and increasingly mad and dangerous prince forms a close relationship with his French stepmother, Elizabeth of Valois, defying all attempts by his desperate father to civilise him.

The idea of King Philip confining and murdering his own son later played a minor role in establishing the anti-Spanish Black Legend in England, and a major one in forming it in the Netherlands, Germany and central Europe. The propaganda created from it formed the basis for Friedrich Schiller's 1787 tragedy Don Karlos, Infant von Spanien.

Schiller based his work on a novel written in 1672 by the French Abbé César Vichard de Saint-Réal, which was also the source used by the English writer Thomas Otway for his play Don Carlos, Prince of Spain. In both works, romantic tragedies that combine nationalism and romantic love, Carlos incarnates the ideal of the romantic knight, noble and brave. He is presented as the lover of young Elizabeth of Valois, Philip's wife, as they both fight for freedom and their love against a cruel, despotic, merciless, and far-too-old-for-Isabel Philip II and his court of equally cruel and despotic Spaniards. Finally, the hero is defeated by treason due to his excess of nobility.

Schiller's play was adapted into several operas, most notably Giuseppe Verdi's Don Carlos (1867, also known under its Italian title, Don Carlo). Verdi's opera is probably the version of the story most familiar to modern audiences, as it is a mainstay of the operatic repertoire and is still frequently performed. In it, Carlos is portrayed sympathetically as a victim of court intrigues, and little reference is made to his mental instability or violent tendencies.

The story of a king jailing his own son is also the basis for the Spanish play La vida es sueño (Life Is a Dream) (1635), by Pedro Calderón de la Barca; however, this play does not explicitly refer to Don Carlos, starts with a different premise, and was likely inspired by a combination of religious reflection and Plato's cave, in the line of Spanish Neoplatonism.

== In popular media ==
Carlos's role is portrayed by Canadian actor Mark Ghanimé in the CW show Reign. He was portrayed as a sexual deviant who enjoyed being whipped and showed interest in ruling Scotland with a crown matrimonial. Reign does hold to the facts of brain damage, but instead of a fall, Don Carlos's head is impaled by a piece of wood from his "sex horse."

Carlos is portrayed by Joseph Cuby as a 14-year-old sadist betrothed to Princess Mariella (Francesca Annis) in the TV series Sir Francis Drake (1962) episode "Visit to Spain."

== In Foxe's Book of Martyrs ==
John Foxe, in Actes and Monuments, better known as Foxe's Book of Martyrs (2nd ed., 1570), wrote the following about Carlos:

One prince intended to abolish the inquisition, but he lost his life before he became king, and consequently before he had the power to do so; for the very intimation of his design procured his destruction.

This was that amiable prince Don Carlos, son of Philip the Second, king of Spain, and grandson of the celebrated emperor Charles V. Don Carlos, possessed all the good qualities of his grandfather without any of the bad ones of his father; and was a prince of great vivacity, admirable learning, and the most amiable disposition.—He had sense enough to see into the errors of popery, and abhorred the very name of the inquisition. He inveighed publicly against the institution, ridiculed the affected piety of the inquisitors, did all he could to expose their atrocious deeds, and even declared, that if he ever came to the crown, he would abolish the inquisition, and exterminate its agents. These things were sufficient to irritate the inquisitors against the prince: they, accordingly, bent their minds to vengeance and determined on his destruction. The inquisitors now employed all their agents and emissaries to spread abroad the most artful insinuations against the prince; and, at length, raised such a spirit of discontent among the people that the king was under the necessity of removing Don Carlos from court. Not content with this, they pursued even his friends, and obliged the king likewise to banish Don John, duke of Austria, his own brother, and consequently uncle to the prince; together with the prince of Parma, nephew to the king, and cousin to the prince, because they well knew that both the duke of Austria, and the prince of Parma, had a most sincere and inviolable attachment to Don Carlos. A few years later, the prince having shown great lenity and favour to the Protestants in the Netherlands, the inquisition loudly exclaimed against him, declaring that as the persons in question were heretics, the prince himself must necessarily be one, since he gave them countenance. In short, they gained so great an ascendency over the mind of the king, who was absolutely a slave to superstition, that, shocking to relate, he sacrificed the feelings of nature to the force of bigotry, and, for fear of incurring the anger of the inquisition, gave up his only son, passing the sentence of death on him himself.

The prince, indeed, had what was termed an indulgence; that is, he was permitted to choose the manner of his death. Roman-like, the unfortunate young hero chose bleeding and the hot bath; when the veins of his arms and legs were opened, he expired gradually, falling a martyr to the malice of the inquisitors, and the stupid bigotry of his father.

== Ancestry ==
Ancestors of Carlos, Prince of Asturias

8. Philip I of Castile
4. Charles V, Holy Roman Emperor
9. Joanna I of Castile
2. Philip II of Spain
10. Manuel I of Portugal
5. Isabella of Portugal
11. Maria of Aragon
1. Carlos, Prince of Asturias
12. Manuel I of Portugal (= 10)
6. John III of Portugal
13. Maria of Aragon (= 11)
3. Maria Manuel of Portugal
14. Philip I of Castile (= 8)
7. Catherine of Austria
15. Joanna I of Castile (= 9)

Unfortunately, the graphic understates his problems. Joanna Trastamara (also known as Joanna of Castille) was Catherine's mother as well.

== Male-line family tree ==
House of Habsburg

Original line
Albert; Count of Habsburg c. 1188–1239
Rudolf I of Germany c. 1218–1291
Albert I of Germany; 1255–1308	Hartmann; 1263–1281	Rudolf II; Duke of Austria; 1270–1290
Rudolf I of Bohemia; 1281–1307	Frederick the Fair c. 1289–1330	Leopold I Duke of Austria; 1290–1326	Albert II; Duke of Austria; 1298–1358	Henry the Friendly; 1299–1327	Otto; Duke of Austria; 1301–1339	John; Parricida c. 1290–1312/1313
Albertinian line	Leopoldian line
Rudolf IV; Duke of Austria; 1339–1365	Frederick III; 1347–1362	Albert III; Duke of Austria; 1349–1395	Leopold III; Duke of Austria; 1351–1386	Frederick II; Duke of Austria; 1327–1344	Leopold II; Duke of Austria; 1328–1344
Albert IV; Duke of Austria; 1377–1404	William; Duke of Austria c. 1370–1406	Leopold IV; Duke of Austria; 1371–1411	Ernest; Duke of Austria; 1377–1424	Frederick IV; Duke of Austria; 1382–1439
Albert II of Germany; 1397–1439	Frederick III; HRE; 1415–1493	Albert VI; Archduke of Austria; 1418–1463	Sigismund; Archduke of Austria; 1427–1496
Ladislaus the Posthumous; 1440–1457	Maximilian I HRE; 1459–1519
Philip I of Castile; 1478–1506
Spanish / Iberian line	Austrian / HRE line
Charles V HRE; 1500–1558	Ferdinand I HRE; 1503–1564
Philip II of Spain; 1527–1598	Maximilian II; HRE; 1527–1576	Ferdinand II; Archduke of Austria; 1529–1595	Charles II; Archduke of Austria; 1540–1590
Carlos; Prince of Asturias; 1545–1568	Philip III of Spain; 1578–1621	Rudolf II; HRE; 1552–1612	Ernest of Austria; 1553–1595	Matthias; HRE; 1557–1619	Maximilian III; Archduke of Austria; 1558–1618	Albert VII; Archduke of Austria; 1559–1621	Wenceslaus; Archduke of Austria; 1561–1578	Andrew; Margrave of Burgau; 1558–1600	Charles; Margrave of Burgau; 1560–1618	Ferdinand II; HRE; 1578–1637	Maximilian Ernest of Austria; 1583–1616	Leopold V Archduke of Austria; 1586–1632	Charles of Austria; 1590–1624
Philip IV of Spain; 1605–1665	Charles of Austria; 1607–1632	Ferdinand of Austria; 1609–1641	John-Charles of Austria; 1605–1619	Ferdinand III; HRE; 1608–1657	Leopold Wilhelm of Austria; 1614–1662	Ferdinand Charles; Archduke of Austria; 1628–1662	Sigismund Francis; Archduke of Austria; 1630–1665
Balthasar Charles; Prince of Asturias; 1629–1646	Charles II of Spain; 1661–1700	Ferdinand IV; King of the Romans; 1633–1654	Leopold I HRE; 1640–1705	Charles Joseph of Austria; 1649–1664
Joseph I HRE; 1678–1711	Charles VI; HRE; 1685–1740
Lorraine
Maria Theresa; HRE; 1740–1780	Francis I HRE; 1745–1765
Habsburg-Lorraine
Joseph II; HRE; 1765–1790	Leopold II; HRE; 1790–1792
Francis II; HRE; 1792–1806

== Sources ==
- Grierson, Edward (1974). King of Two Worlds: Philip II of Spain. New York: Putnam. ISBN 978-0-399-11384-0.
- Hume, Martin Andrew Sharp (1899). Philip II. of Spain. London, New York: Macmillan.
- Fernández Álvarez, Manuel (1998). Felipe II y su tiempo (in Spanish). Madrid: Espasa-Calpe. ISBN 978-84-239-9736-7.
- Kamen, Henry (1998). Philip of Spain. Yale University Press. ISBN 978-0-300-07800-8.
- Kamen, Henry (2017). Carlos Emperador: Vida del rey César (in Spanish). La Esfera de los Libros. ISBN 8490608741.
- Loth, David (1932). Philip II. New York: Brentano's.
- Marshall, Peter (2006). The Magic Circle of Rudolf II: Alchemy and Astrology in Renaissance Prague. Walker & Company. ISBN 978-0-8027-1551-7.
- Parker, Geoffrey (2002). Philip II (4th ed.). Open Court. ISBN 978-0-8126-9519-9.
- Parker, Geoffrey (2014). Imprudent King: A New Life of Philip II. Yale University Press. ISBN 978-0-300-196535.
- Petrie, Sir Charles (1964). Philip II of Spain. Readers Union.
- Walsh, William Thomas (1937). Philip II. New York: Sheed & Ward. ISBN 978-0-89555-327-0.

Carlos, Prince of Asturias House of Habsburg Born: 8 July 1545 Died: 24 July 1568
Spanish royalty
Preceded by Philip	Prince of Asturias; 1556–1568	Vacant Title next held by Ferdinand
