= Don Carlos, Prince of Spain =

1676 play

- Original language: English
- Written by: Thomas Otway
- Genre: Tragedy

Premiere
- Date: 8 July 1676
- Place: Dorset Garden Theatre, London

Don Carlos, Prince of Spain is a 1676 tragedy by the English writer Thomas Otway. It portrays the relationship between Philip II of Spain and his son and heir Don Carlos. The play is based on the novel by Abbe de Saint-Réal.

It was staged by the Duke's Company at the Dorset Garden Theatre. The cast featured Thomas Betterton as Philip II, William Smith as Don Carlos, Henry Harris as Don John, John Crosby as Marquis of Posa, Matthew Medbourne as Rui Gomez, Henry Norris as an Officer of the Guards, Mary Lee as the Queen of Spain, and Anne Shadwell as the Duchess of Eboli.

== Bibliography ==
- Van Lennep, W. The London Stage, 1660-1800: Volume One, 1660-1700. Southern Illinois University Press, 1960.
