= She-tragedy =

Type of tragedy play focusing on women

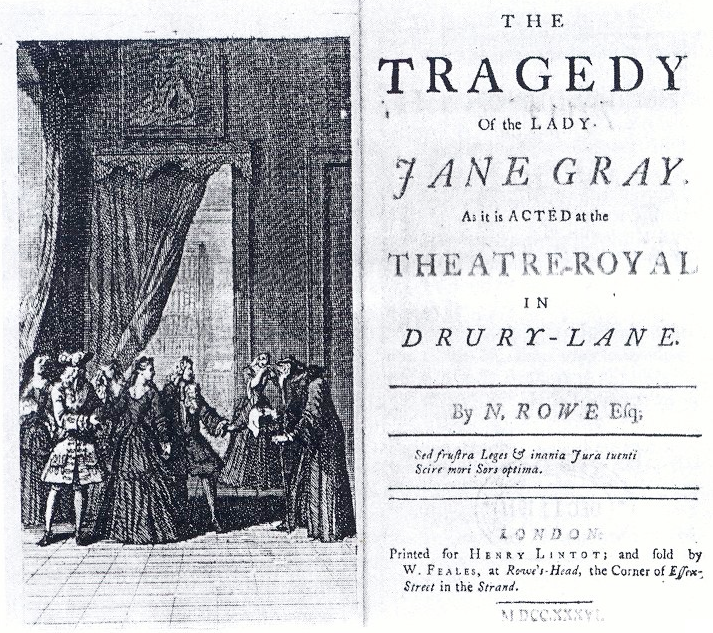
The Tragedy of Lady Jane Grey by Nicholas Rowe

The term she-tragedy, also known as pathetic tragedy refers to a vogue in the late 17th and early 18th centuries for tragic plays focused on the sufferings of a woman, sometimes innocent and virtuous but often a woman who had committed some sort of sexual sin. Prominent she-tragedies include Thomas Otway's The Orphan (1680), John Banks' Virtue Betrayed, or, Anna Bullen (1682), Thomas Southerne's The Fatal Marriage (1694), Mary Pix's Ibrahim, the Thirteenth Emperor of the Turks and Nicholas Rowe's The Fair Penitent (1703) and Lady Jane Grey (1715). Rowe was the first to use the term "she-tragedy," in 1714.

== Overview ==
When English drama was reborn in 1660 with the re-opening of the theatres, the leading tragic style was the male-dominated heroic drama which celebrated powerful, aggressively masculine heroes and their pursuit of glory, as rulers and conquerors as well as lovers. In the 1670s and 1680s, a gradual shift occurred from heroic to pathetic tragedy, where the subject was love and domestic concerns, even though the main characters might be public figures. After the phenomenal success of Elizabeth Barry in moving the audience to tears in the role of Monimia in Otway's The Orphan, she-tragedy became the dominant form of pathetic tragedy and remained highly popular for nearly half a century.

The realm of pathetic tragedy became an exploration of the female experience as the private female sphere, that of the domestic, was put on the stage and publicized. The she-tragedies demonstrated the psychology and behavior of women in their private sphere and presented it for public consideration, a new concept that emerged as women began to star in main roles instead of only supporting characters. For the first time, plays were written that had a woman as the main character and that followed her experiences and emotions. She-tragedies brought what was once solely internal (emotions and thoughts) out for external display. The rise of pathetic tragedy commodified the female experience and women themselves with the transition from men (dressed as women) playing the female roles to women acting on the stage themselves. Actresses, while not unusual in Continental Europe, were just beginning to be accepted as a novelty by the predominantly male audience. The idea of the woman, occupier of the private sphere, as a public figure was bizarre. As a result, actresses often had a bad moral reputation as before the Restoration, public women were immoral women. However, royal sanction gave actresses more opportunities and opened the way for new dramatic possibilities.

== Components of she-tragedy ==
She tragedies are known for having focused on the hardships of women rather than those suffered by men. A she-tragedy during the 1680s derived its power from the ability to create titillating scenes that portrayed the suffering of an innocent woman. Pathetic tragedies would begin by presenting the heroine and establishing that she was desirable. Unlike the other popular new genre, horror, the she-tragedy did not depend on violence and gore to become the spectacle of the heroine but rather used the physical suffering that was inflicted on the blameless female victims. The women, who were the subject of the play, would usually become victims of adversity and crimes that sexually exploited them such as rape or unsolicited adultery. During the scenes of rape the woman would be abducted and carried off stage. The act of rape, or adultery, would be conveyed to the audience by screams from the woman as the villain completed the evil deed. After the scene the woman would return onstage. Evidences of ravished womanhood such as disheveled hair, disordered clothing, and phallic dagger were trademark of Restoration rape and prominent in she-tragedy. Playwrights would utilize other ill fortune such as the loss of a husband or child and a single mother's struggle to raise her children as another means of causing hardship in the heroine's life. After suffering these hardships throughout the play the female protagonist would be overcome by madness, commit suicide or murder as a result of the burden with which she had suffered. The success of a she-tragedy was dependent upon the emotion that the actress conveyed to the audience, but the emotion that the audience felt as they watched the performance. She-tragedy also focused on making the heroine and not the hero the focus of the play. Attention would be placed on the female actress and her sexuality as playwrights used specific dialogue and devices to focus on the sexuality of the woman. One example of this is seen in The Orphan by Otway. In a scene Monimia is accompanied by a page who states to her

"Madam, Indeed I'd serve you with my soul;
But n the morning when you call me to you
As by your bed I stand and tell you stories,
I am asham'd to see your swelling Breasts,
It makes me blush, they are so very white." (1.221-25)

Here Otway is directing the audience's eyes to the actress' breasts, making her the focal point, and also sexualizing the actress and the character of Monima.

== Use in political propaganda ==
While she-tragedies were highly entertaining to the public, playwrights would also use them to voice political opinions. In Rowe's Jane Grey the character Jane represents a symbol of virtue whose desires are second to the political good. During the 1690s the rape in she-tragedies leaned towards Whig beliefs and became a symbol for the justification for displacing proper rule. The spectacle of rape within the tragedy was used to convey the belief that the sexual assault on the female victim was a visual representation of assault on the subjects' liberties.

== Actresses and royal support ==
One reason that the Carolinian court was more accepting of the addition of women to the world of theater was the experience of the new monarch, Charles II, before he ascended to the throne. Charles I was executed during the English Civil War, and his son (the future Charles II) went into exile. Charles II spent much of his exile living at the French court and learning French tastes and manners. Although practically unheard of in England, it was not uncommon for women to take part in French and Italian theater, and Charles II would have been exposed to this. As a result, after he returned to England in 1660, Charles II did not have the same qualms as his countrymen when it came to the more public presence of women.

In addition, in 1662, a law was passed that women's roles were to be played by women and no longer by men. It is speculated that this change was at least partially due to the influence of the Puritans, who "took offence" at men cross-dressing to play women, something that was seen as going against the biblical Book of Deuteronomy (22:5). Ironically, this attempt to reclaim morality in theater led to further scandals as the practice of "breeches roles" developed. These were roles played by woman while wearing men's clothing, either as part of a disguise required by the script or to give the actresses more license to behave as society allowed men to. These roles, while often part of elaborate plots, were sometimes used to exploit the physical aspects of women – as men's clothing did not disguise the body's form as much as the dresses traditionally worn by women.

== Women in tragedy ==
The new focus on women in tragedy may be linked with a growing political disillusion with the old aristocratic ideology and its traditional masculine ideals (see Staves). Other possible explanations for the great interest in she-tragedy are the popularity of Mary II, who often ruled alone in the 1690s while her husband William III was on the Continent, and the publication of The Spectator, the first periodical aimed at women. Elizabeth Howe has argued that the most important explanation for the shift in taste was the emergence of tragic actresses whose popularity made it unavoidable for dramatists to create major roles for them. With the conjunction of the playwright "master of pathos" Thomas Otway and the great tragedienne Elizabeth Barry in The Orphan, the focus shifted decisively from hero to heroine.

== Sources ==
- Canfield, J. Douglas (2001). "The Broadview Anthology of Restoration and Early Eighteenth-Century Drama". Broadview Press. (ISBN 978-1-55111-270-1)
- Howe, Elizabeth (1992). The First English Actresses: Women and Drama 1660–1700. Cambridge: Cambridge University Press. (ISBN 978-0-521-42210-9)
- Staves, Susan (1979). Player's Scepters: Fictions of Authority in the Restoration. Lincoln, Nebraska. (ISBN 978-0-8032-4102-2)
- Stewart, Ann Marie (2010). "The Ravishing Restoration: Aphra Behn, Violence, and Comedy". Susquehanna University Press. (ISBN 978-1-57591-134-2)
