= William Smith (actor, died 1696) =

British actor

- Died: 1696
- Occupation: Actor

William Smith (died 1696) was an English actor.

== Biography ==
Smith was a barrister of Gray's Inn, and joined the Duke of York's company, under Sir William D'Avenant, a year after its formation. He was a man of social position, and acknowledged as such in aristocratic circles and in his profession. At Lincoln's Inn Fields, at Dorset Garden, and ultimately at the Theatre Royal and the new house in Little Lincoln's Inn Fields, he held a position in the first rank, and created many original parts of primary importance. His name appears on 8 January 1663 to the part of the Corrigidor (sic) in Sir Samuel Tuke's ‘Adventures of Five Hours.’ He was on 28 May Lugo in Sir Robert Stapleton's ‘Slighted Maid;’ on 1 January 1664 he was Buckingham in a revival of ‘King Henry VIII,’ and on 13 August the Duke of Burgundy in ‘Henry V,’ by the Earl of Orrery. In Etherege's ‘Comical Revenge, or Love in a Tub,’ he was Colonel Bruce; in ‘The Rivals,’ D'Avenant's alteration of the ‘Two Noble Kinsmen,’ Polynices; and Antonio in a revival of Webster's ‘Duchess of Malfi.’ On 3 April 1665 he was Zanger in Lord Orrery's ‘Mustapha.’ After the cessation of performances on account of the plague, he distinguished himself on 7 March 1667 as Sir William Stanley in Caryl's ‘English Princess, or the Death of Richard the Third.’ On 14 Nov. preceding, Pepys writes: ‘Knipp tells me how Smith of the Duke's house hath killed a man upon a quarrel in play, which makes everybody sorry, he being a good actor, and, they say, a good man, however this happens. The ladies of the court do much bemoan him, she says’ (Diary, ed. Wheatley, vi. 62).

In ‘Sir Martin Marrall, or Feigned Innocence,’ by Dryden and the Duke of Newcastle, 16 August (second time), Smith was Sir John Swallow. On 6 February 1668 in ‘She would if she could,’ by Etherege, he was Courtall, and on 5 May Stanford in Shadwell's ‘Sullen Lovers.’ The piece had, says Downes, a wonderful success, and was played before the court at Dover. In Caryl's ‘Sir Solomon, or the Cautious Coxcomb,’ played in 1669, he was Young Single. Betterton's ‘Amorous Widow’ followed in 1670, showing Smith as Cunningham. Foscaris in Edward Howard's ‘Women's Conquest’ was seen in 1671, as was Sharnofsky in Crowne's ‘Juliana, or the Princess of Poland.’

The new theatre in Dorset Garden was opened by the Duke's company, under Lady D'Avenant, with ‘Sir Martin Marrall,’ on 9 November, when Smith presumably played his original part. He was here Prince of Salerne in Crowne's ‘Charles VIII, or the Invasion of Naples.’ At Dorset Garden Smith remained until the junction of the two companies in 1682. He was in 1672 Woodly in Shadwell's ‘Epsom Wells;’ Pisauro in Arrowsmith's ‘Reformation;’ Banquo, one of his great parts, in ‘Macbeth,’ converted into an opera; Don Antonio in Nevil Payne's ‘Fatal Jealousy;’ Philander in Mrs. Behn's ‘Forced Marriage.’ The year 1673 saw him as Ruffle in Nevil Payne's ‘Morning Ramble,’ Careless in Ravenscroft's ‘Careless Lovers,’ Muley Hamet in Settle's ‘Empress of Morocco,’ Horatio in a revival of ‘Hamlet;’ 1674 as Quitazo in Settle's ‘Conquest of China by the Tartars,’ and Tyridates in ‘Herod and Mariamne;’ and 1675 as Clotair in Settle's ‘Love and Revenge.’ In Settle's ‘Ibrahim the Illustrious Bassa,’ 1676, he was Ibrahim; in Etherege's ‘Man of the Mode, or Sir Fopling Flutter,’ Sir Fopling; in Otway's ‘Don Carlos, Prince of Spain,’ Don Carlos; in D'Urfey's ‘Fond Husband,’ Rashley; in Ravenscroft's Wrangling Lovers,’ Don Diego; in D'Urfey's ‘Madame Fickle,’ Manley; and in Settle's ‘Pastor Fido, or the Faithful Shepherd,’ Mirtillo, the faithful shepherd. Antiochus in Otway's ‘Titus and Berenice’ was apparently the first novelty in 1677, in which year Smith was also the first Cæsar in Sedley's ‘Antony and Cleopatra;’ Willmore the rover in Mrs. Behn's ‘Rover;’ Perdicas in Pordage's ‘Siege of Babylon;’ Philip in Mrs. Behn's ‘Abdelazer, or the Moore's Revenge.’ Ulysses in Banks's ‘Destruction of Troy’ belong to 1678, as do Lodwick Knowell in Mrs. Behn's ‘Sir Patient Fancy;’ Malagene in Otway's ‘Friendship in Fashion,’ Henry Raymond in D'Urfey's ‘Squire Oldsapp,’ Peralta in Leanerd's ‘Counterfeits,’ and Alcibiades in Shadwell's ‘Timon of Athens, or the Man-Hater.’ Genest, with some reason, supposes that he was Woodall in Dryden's ‘Limberham,’ the cast of which has not survived. To 1679 belong Adrastus in Dryden and Lee's ‘Œdipus;’ Hector in ‘Troilus and Cressida, or Truth found too late,’ altered by Dryden from Shakespeare; and Sir Harry Fillamour in Mrs. Behn's ‘Feigned Courtezans.’ In 1680 he was Machiavel in Lee's ‘Cæsar Borgia,’ Chamont in ‘The Orphan,’ Marius Junior in Otway's ‘History and Fall of Caius Marius’ (long the accepted adaptation of ‘Romeo and Juliet’), Beaufort in D'Urfey's ‘Virtuous Wife,’ Wellman in Mrs. Behn's ‘Revenge,’ and Marcian in Lee's ‘Theodosius.’ The year 1681 led off with the ‘First Part of Henry VI,’ altered by Crowne, in which Smith was the Duke of Suffolk. In the second part of the same play he was Edward Plantagenet. He was, besides, Edgar in Tate's alteration of ‘Lear,’ Willmore in the second part of Mrs. Behn's ‘Rover,’ Titus in Lee's ‘Lucius Junius Brutus,’ Courtine in Otway's ‘Soldier's Fortune,’ and Lorenzo in Dryden's ‘Spanish Friar.’ The following year (1682) witnessed the junction of the two companies. Before this event occurred Smith was, at Dorset Garden, the original Pierre in Otway's ‘Venice Preserved,’ Sir Charles Kinglove in D'Urfey's ‘Royalist,’ King Harry in Banks's ‘Virtue Betrayed, or Anna Bullen,’ Don Carlos in Mrs. Behn's ‘False Count,’ and Ramble in Ravenscroft's ‘London Cuckolds.’ After the union he was, at the Theatre Royal, Grillon in Dryden's ‘Duke of Guise.’

In the memorandum of agreement, 14 October 1682, the name of Smith is joined with those of Dr. Charles D'Avenant and Thomas Betterton on the one side, as against Charles Hart and Edward Kynaston on the other. Smith's connection with the united companies was soon severed, though the retirement of Harris left none but Betterton to dispute his supremacy. He played, at the Theatre Royal, Leon in ‘Rule a Wife and have a Wife,’ and Cassius in ‘Julius Cæsar,’ neither of them original parts; and was the first Constantine in Lee's ‘Constantine the Great,’ Courtine in Otway's ‘Atheist,’ and Lorenzo in Southerne's ‘Disappointment.’

After James II's accession his name disappears from the bills for eleven years. Cibber mentions the circumstances under which his retirement took place. Smith, ‘whose character as a gentleman could have been no way impeached had he not degraded it by being a celebrated actor,’ was struck behind the scenes by a man of fashion with whom he had a dispute. James II, on hearing a full account of the circumstances, forbade the offender his presence. This was resented by the mohocks of the court, and a party was formed to humble the actor. On his appearance Smith was received with a chorus of cat-calls. Convinced that he would not be allowed to proceed, he composedly ordered the curtain to be lowered, and ‘having a competent fortune of his own, thought the conditions of adding to it by his remaining on the stage even too dear, and from that day entirely quitted it’ (Cibber, Apology, ed. Lowe, i. 79). Smith is said to have been greatly attached to James II, whose army, according to Chetwood, the actor joined as a volunteer upon the outbreak of the revolution, in company with two attendants.

On the secession of the actors from the Theatre Royal in 1695, Smith was prevailed on by Betterton and Mrs. Barry, his old associates, as well as by friends of high rank, and at the direct intercession of Congreve, to return to the stage. On the opening of the theatre in Little Lincoln's Inn Fields, with Congreve's ‘Love for Love,’ Smith took the part of Scandal. He was received with much enthusiasm. In 1696 he played Warner in a revival of ‘Sir Martin Marrall,’ and was the original Cyaxares in Banks's ‘Cyrus the Great.’ On the day of the fourth representation he was taken ill, and died shortly afterwards (Genest, ii. 96).

Smith is believed to have had a commanding figure. What Otway says in ‘Venice Preserved’ of the figure of Pierre is supposed to depict Smith, who was intended for this part. Don Carlos, another of Smith's original parts, is described as a ‘tall able slave’ Barton Booth wrote a Latin epitaph on Smith, placed under ‘his picture.’ What portrait is referred to, however, cannot now be ascertained. Booth's lines describe him as an excellent player in the reign of Charles II, the friend of Betterton, and almost his equal; a man of no ignoble family nor destitute of polite learning. Smith's unbroken friendship with Betterton reflects high credit upon him, as does indeed all that is known concerning him. He is one of the most interesting and distinguished figures of the Restoration stage.
