= Prince Balthasar Charles with a Dwarf =

Painting by Diego Velázquez

Prince Balthasar Charles With a Dwarf
- El príncipe Baltasar Carlos con un enano (Spanish)
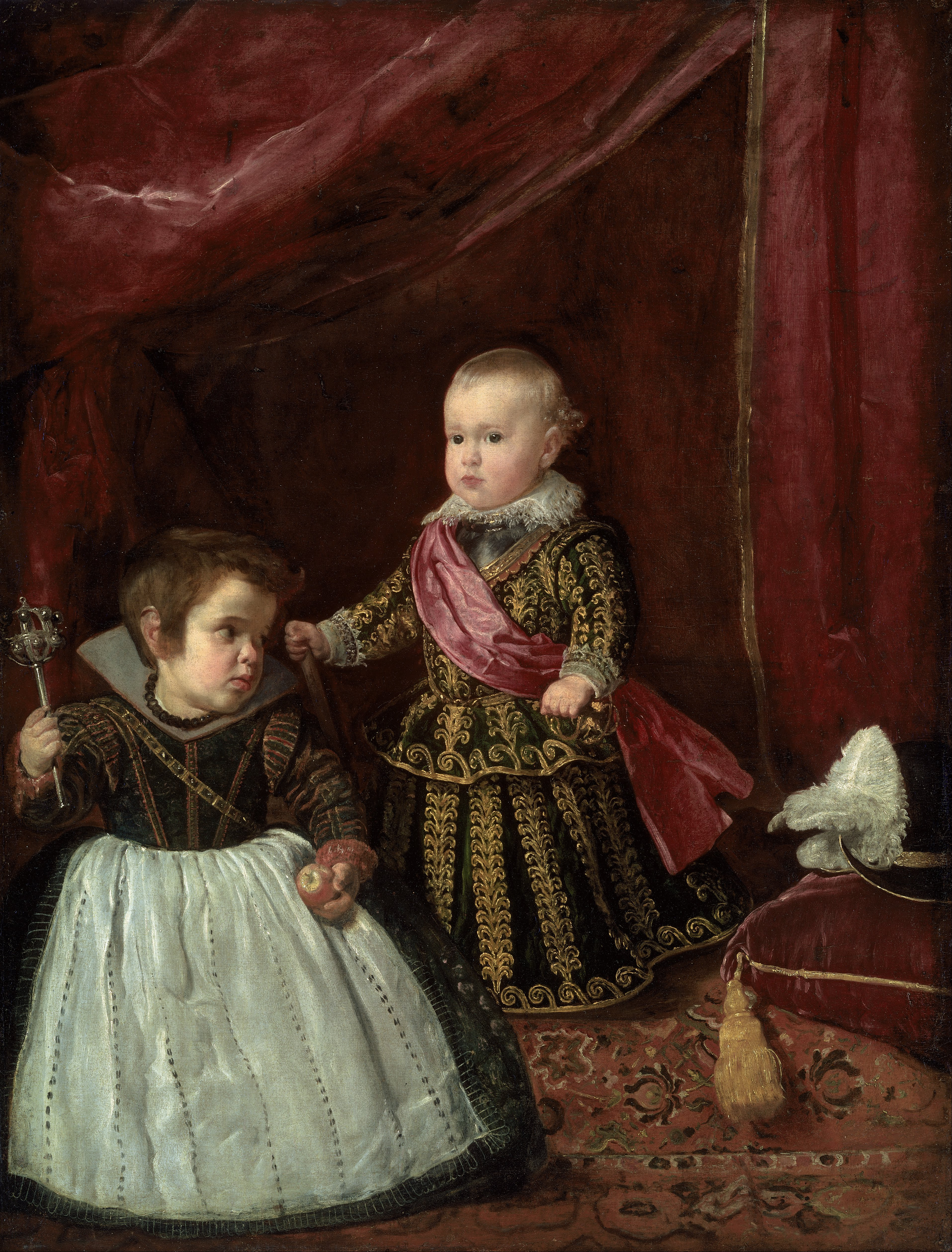
- Artist: Diego Velázquez
- Year: 1631
- Medium: Oil on canvas
- Dimensions: 128 cm × 102 cm (50 in × 40 in)
- Location: Museum of Fine Arts, Boston

Prince Balthasar Charles With a Dwarf is a 1631 portrait by Diego Velázquez of Balthasar Charles, Prince of Asturias and a court dwarf. It is now in the Museum of Fine Arts in Boston. It is the first of several portraits Velázquez painted of the young prince.

== Provenance ==
The piece was originally acquired by Henry Howard, the 4th Earle of Carlisle, in the city of Parma in the mid-eighteenth century. After the painting was held by the family for over a century, it was sold by George James Howard, the 9th Earle of Carlisle, to Knoedler and Co. in 1900. The company received shipment of the work in October 1900 before it was sold to the Museum of Fine Arts in Boston for the amount of $80,000 in 1901. The piece officially entered the MFA's collection on February 2, 1901, and has remained in the collection since.

== Interpretation and debate over the dwarf ==
The debate surrounding the dwarf in Velázquez's portrait of Prince Baltasar Carlos hinges on conflicting interpretations of the figure's role, identity, and even the timing of its inclusion in the composition. Scholars like Bernardino de Pantorba argue that the dwarf was a later addition, painted separately from the original portrait of the prince. Pantorba suggested the dwarf's dynamic presence is stylistically distinct from the prince's meticulously detailed figure, implying it may have been added after 1634, when the documented dwarf Francisco Lezcano entered the prince's service. José Camón Aznar, however, argued the dwarf is female, noting the “feminine attire,” including a lace-trimmed collar and skirt-like garment.

Julián Gállego interprets the dwarf as a symbolic counterpoint to the prince's Habsburg gravitas. Gállego also speculates that the prince may actually represent a "picture within the picture." He posits that the dwarf may stand in front of a painted replica of an earlier 1631 portrait of the prince, citing the horizontal line dividing the carpet: the dwarf occupies a “real” space, while the prince's carpet, rendered in vertical perspective with finer details, appears illusionistic, as if part of a separate artwork. If correct, the dwarf's looser style reflects his placement in the “real” world, while the prince exists within a framed artifice—a conceptual game that reconciles the painting's proposed 1631–1632 date with the dwarf's later stylistic flourishes.

== See also ==
- List of works by Diego Velázquez
