= César Vichard de Saint-Réal =

French polyglot

César Vichard de Saint-Réal (1639–1692) was a Savoyard polyglot.

== Life ==
He was born in Chambéry, Savoy, (then in the Savoyard state) but educated in Lyon by the Jesuits. He used to work in the royal library with Antoine Varillas, a French historiographer who influenced the way Saint-Réal that wrote history. He used to be a reader and friend of Hortense Mancini, duchesse de Mazarin, who took him with her to England (1675).

== Works ==
Saint-Réal was a polygraph writer. His works belong to different genres, but he always had an interest in history.

After some minor works written in order to win the protection of Louis XIV, he wrote De l'usage de l'histoire in 1671. In this essay, he speaks about the good way of writing history and explains that understanding of facts is more important than facts themselves. In 1672, he published Dom Carlos, subtitled "nouvelle historique". The short novel or a long short story relates the love story of a forbidden passion between Dom Carlos, the son of Philip II of Spain, and his father's wife Elisabeth of Valois. Saint-Réal mixes politics and love, but love appears much more important. The novel was a hit with high society. French critics now see it as an important text in the construction of the French psychological novel. It announces the style of Madame de La Fayette novels. Dom Carlos was the basis for Friedrich Schiller’s play Don Carlos (which in turn became the source material for several operatic works, including Giuseppe Verdi’s opera of the same name). Saint-Réal’s book was also the basis of the English writer Thomas Otway’s play Don Carlos, Prince of Spain.

However, Saint-Réal wanted to be a serious writer. He needed to write texts that were not fiction and so he published in 1674 la Conjuration des Espagnols contre la République de Venise en l'année M. DC. XVIII. It relates a Spanish conjuration against Venice. The historical work is not serious by modern criteria, but it was regarded by contemporaries as an example of classicist style in historical writing. In Le Siècle de Louis XIV, Voltaire calls Saint-Réal the "French Sallust" because of this work.

The authorship of the duchess's Mémoires has been ascribed to Saint-Real, but no proof exists. He also wrote a Vie de Jésus Christ in 1678, a summary of the gospels. He took part in the literary arguments of his time with the short treatise De la critique (1691), directed against Andry de Boisregard's Réflexions sur la langue française. There were many editions of hisŒuvres complètes from the 17th to the 19th centuries, some of which were longer than others by including some works falsely attributed to him.

== Bibliography ==
- Dom Carlos, nouvelle historique, Amsterdam, 1672, In-12.
- Conjuration des Espagnols contre la République de Venise en l'Année M. DC. XVIII, 146 pp., Paris, Claude Barbin, 1674. (Reedition, 1683)
- Dom Carlos et La Conjuration des Espagnols contre la République de Venise, facsimile of original editions, Genève, Droz, 1977, 675 p., 18 cm.
- Conjuración de los españoles contra la República de Venecia, de C. Vichard de Saint-Réal, Encarnación Medina Arjona (Traducción, introducción y notas), Jaén, Instituto de Estudios Giennenses - Diputación Provincial de Jaén, 2010.
- Gustave Dulong, L'abbé de Saint-Réal, Étude sur les rapports de l'histoire et du roman, thèse, Paris, Honoré Champion, 1921. Slatkine Reprints, 1980.
- Père Lelong, Bibliothèque historique de la France, No. 48, 122;
- Andrée Mansau, Saint-Réal et l'humanisme cosmopolite, Lille, Atelier de reproduction des thèses, 1996.
- Barolo, Memorie spettanti ella vita di Saint-Rial (1780; Saint-Real was an associate of the Academy of Turin).
- Chisholm, Hugh, ed. (1911). "Saint-Réal, César Vichard de" . Encyclopædia Britannica. Vol. 24 (11th ed.). Cambridge University Press. p. 43.
