= The Cheats of Scapin =

1676 play

- Original language: English
- Written by: Thomas Otway
- Genre: Restoration Comedy

Premiere
- Date: December 1676
- Place: Dorset Garden Theatre, London

The Cheats of Scapin is a 1676 comedy play by the English writer Thomas Otway. It is an adaptation of the French play Scapin the Schemer by Molière. It premiered at the Dorset Garden Theatre performed by the Duke's Company as an afterpiece to Otway's new tragedy Titus and Berenice.

The original cast included Anthony Leigh as Scapin, Samuel Sandford as Thrifty, James Nokes as Gripe, Henry Norris as Octavian, Thomas Percival as Leander, John Richards as Shift, Elizabeth Barry as Lucia and Anne Shadwell as Clara.

== Bibliography ==
- Canfield, J. Douglas. Tricksters and Estates: On the Ideology of Restoration Comedy. University Press of Kentucky, 2014.
- Van Lennep, W. The London Stage, 1660-1800: Volume One, 1660-1700. Southern Illinois University Press, 1960.
