= Prince Balthasar Charles as a Hunter =

Painting by Diego Velázquez

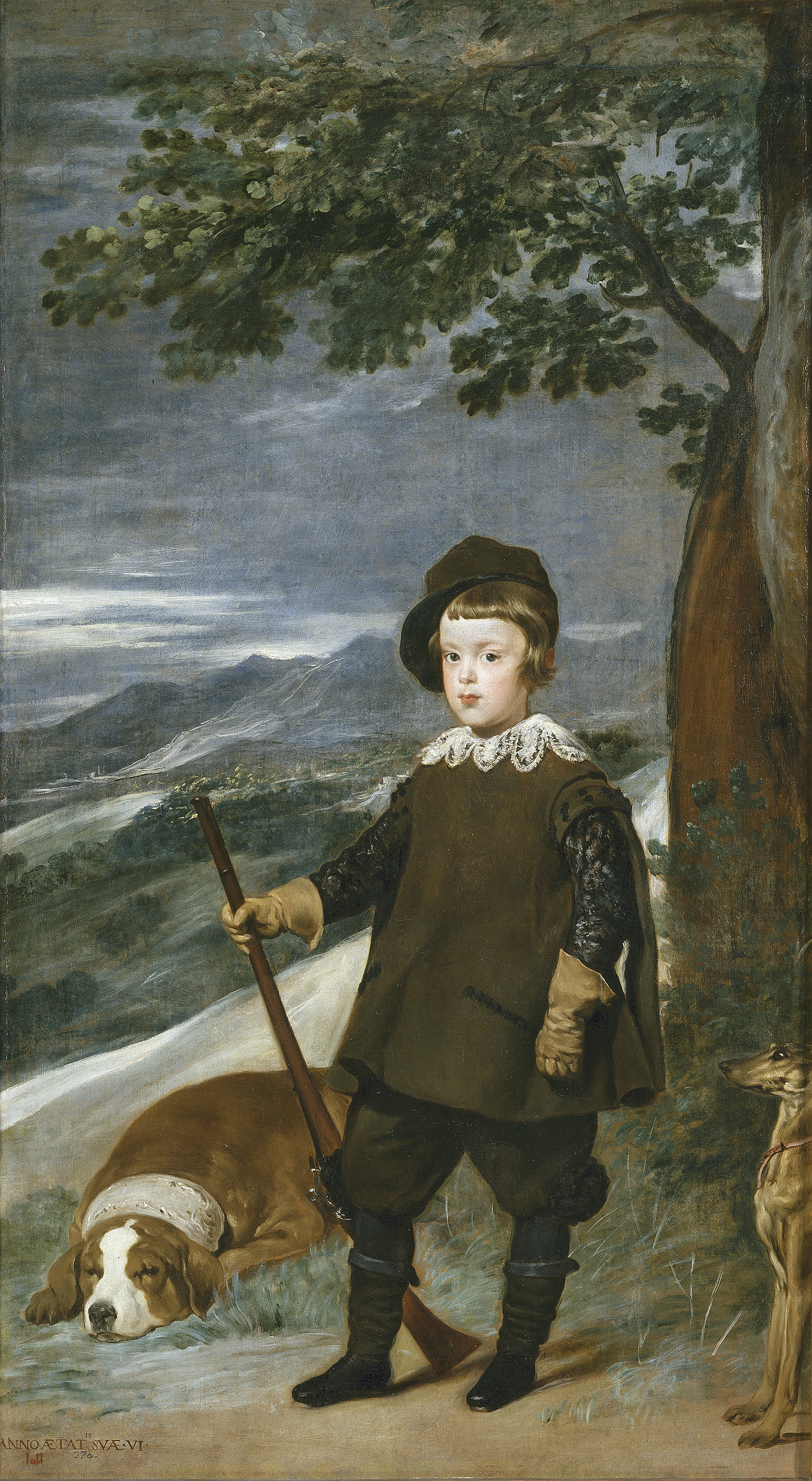
- Artist: Diego Velázquez
- Year: 1635
- Medium: Oil on canvas
- Dimensions: 191 cm × 103 cm (75 in × 41 in)
- Location: Museo del Prado, Madrid

Prince Balthasar Charles as a Hunter is a 1635 portrait of Balthasar Charles, Prince of Asturias by Diego Velázquez. It is now held at the Museo del Prado.

== Theme ==
King Phillip IV commissioned Velázquez to paint a series of portraits on the theme of the hunt, all of which were to adorn the hunting lodge that was built in the mountain of Pardo, close to Madrid, called Torre de la Parada. This pavilion was later converted into an art museum with a long series of Ovid's Metamorphosis, painted by Rubens. This pavilion was reserved exclusively for the Court, and no one else had access to it. It became one of the most important collections on the subject of mythology and a variety of nudes.

Velázquez painted two other works for this location on the theme of the hunt: El cardenal infante don Fernando de Austria cazador and Felipe IV cazador. The three works have something in common: a long format, the figure presented in three quartes, hunting weapon in hand and hunting clothes on the protagonists. It is known the painter created many more works on this subject but none of them are in Spain.

== Description ==
The prince is dressed in adequate clothing for this sport. A dark cloak with sleeves, wide jodhpurs, a grey embroidered blouse, a lace collar, knee-high boots, and a rifle of the appropriate size for a child.

In the painting there are two dogs, which are never missing from a hunting scene. One of these is very large, so much so that the painter decided to represent him sleeping so that he would not detract from the slight figure of the prince; it has large ears and its head is lying on the ground. The other is a little dog that is leaving the painting, a cinnamon colored greyhound with lively eyes, whose head reaches the height of the child's hand.

The landscape is represented by the presence of an oak that accompanies the figure. One appreciates the forest of Pardo and in the background the blue mountains of Madrid, in the distance. The sky is gray, as if it were an autumn day, and it is full of clouds.

The critics agree in assuring that the head of the prince is an example of the skill of the painter.

== See also ==
- List of works by Diego Velázquez
- Charles Balthasar

== Bibliography ==
- Historia general del arte, Tomo XIII, colección Summa Artis, La pintura española del siglo XVII. Autor, José Camón Aznar. Editorial Espasa-Calpe. Madrid 1977
- La pintura en el barroco José Luis Morales y Marín Espasa Calpe S.A. 1998. ISBN 84-239-8627-6
- Museo del Prado. Pintura española de los siglos XVI y XVII, Enrique Lafuente Ferrari Aguilar S.A. 1964
