= Balthasar Charles, Prince of Asturias =

Prince of Asturias (1629–1646)

Balthasar Charles
- Prince of Asturias; Prince of Portugal
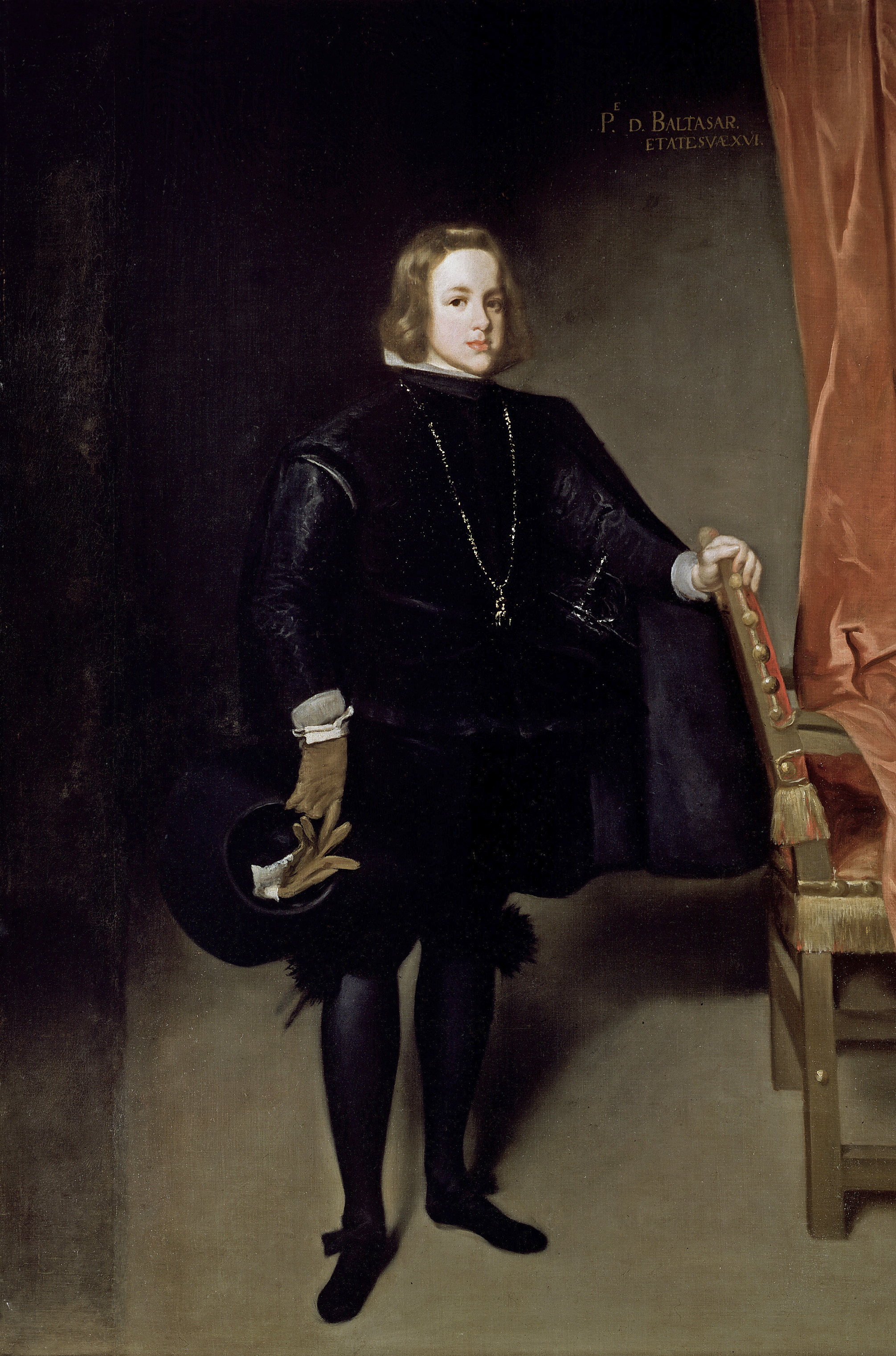
- Portrait c. 1645-46
- Born: 17 October 1629; Royal Alcázar, Madrid, Spain
- Died: 9 October 1646 (aged 16); Zaragoza, Spain
Names
- Baltasar Carlos de Austria y Borbón
- House: Habsburgs of Spain
- Father: Philip IV of Spain
- Mother: Elisabeth of France

Balthasar Charles (Spanish: Baltasar Carlos de Austria; 17 October 1629 - 9 October 1646), Prince of Asturias, Prince of Girona, Prince of Viana, Prince of Portugal, Duke of Montblanc, Count of Cervera, and Lord of Balaguer was heir apparent to all the kingdoms, states and dominions of the Spanish monarchy from his birth until his death.

== Life ==
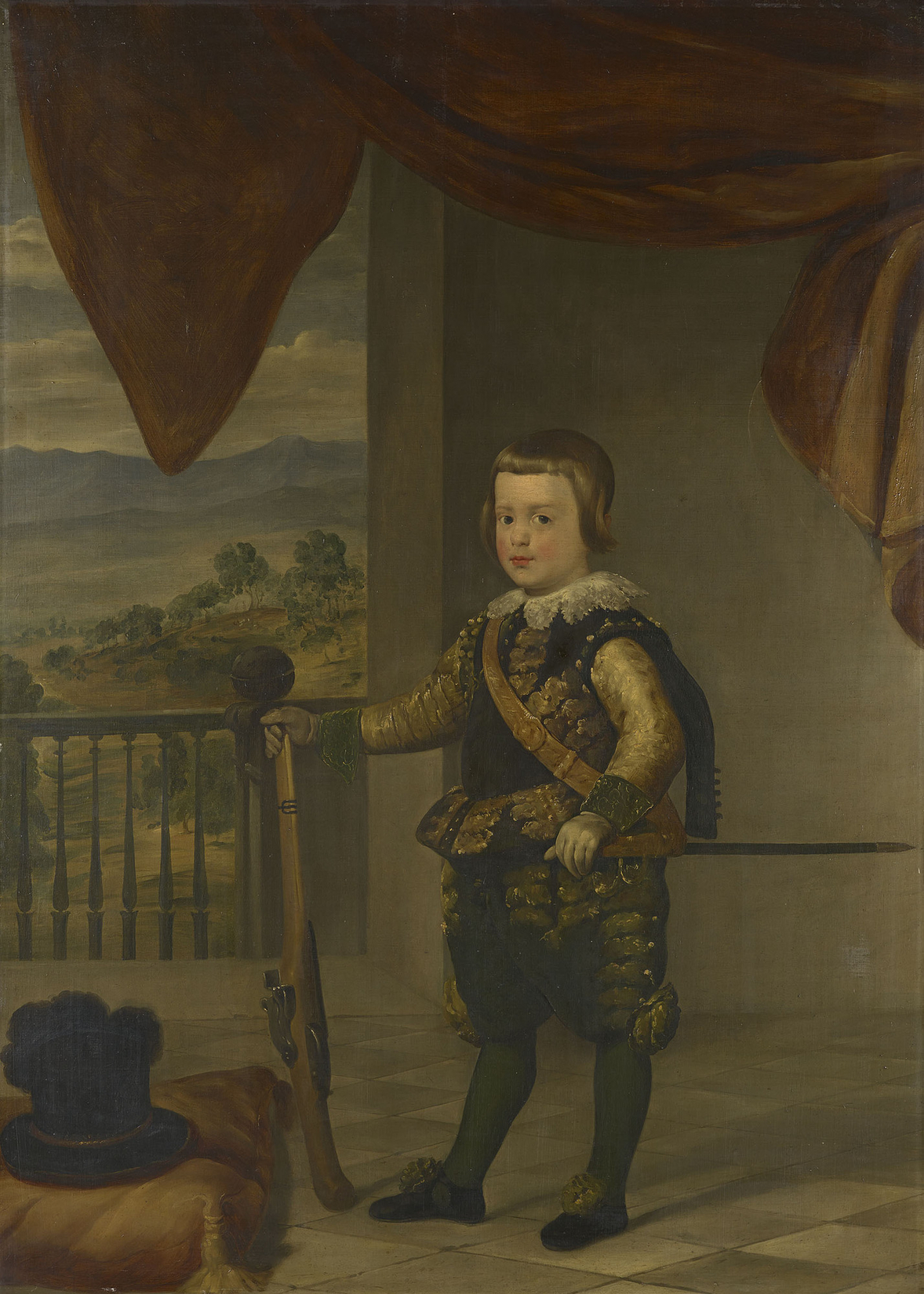
Prince Balthazar Carlos, after Diego Velázquez c. 1633

The only son of King Philip IV of Spain and his first wife, Elisabeth of France, Balthasar Charles was born in the Royal Palace of Madrid on 17 October 1629. He was baptized on 4 November 1629 in the Parish of San Juan, Madrid. His godparents were Maria Anna, Holy Roman Empress and Infante Charles, aunt and uncle of the newborn.

On 7 March 1632, Balthasar Carlos was sworn in before the Nobility of Castile as "His Majesty's Heir" and "Prince of these kingdoms of Castile and Leon, and others that are subject to these Crowns, united and incorporated", in a ceremony held at the Monastery of San Jerónimo el Real of Madrid.

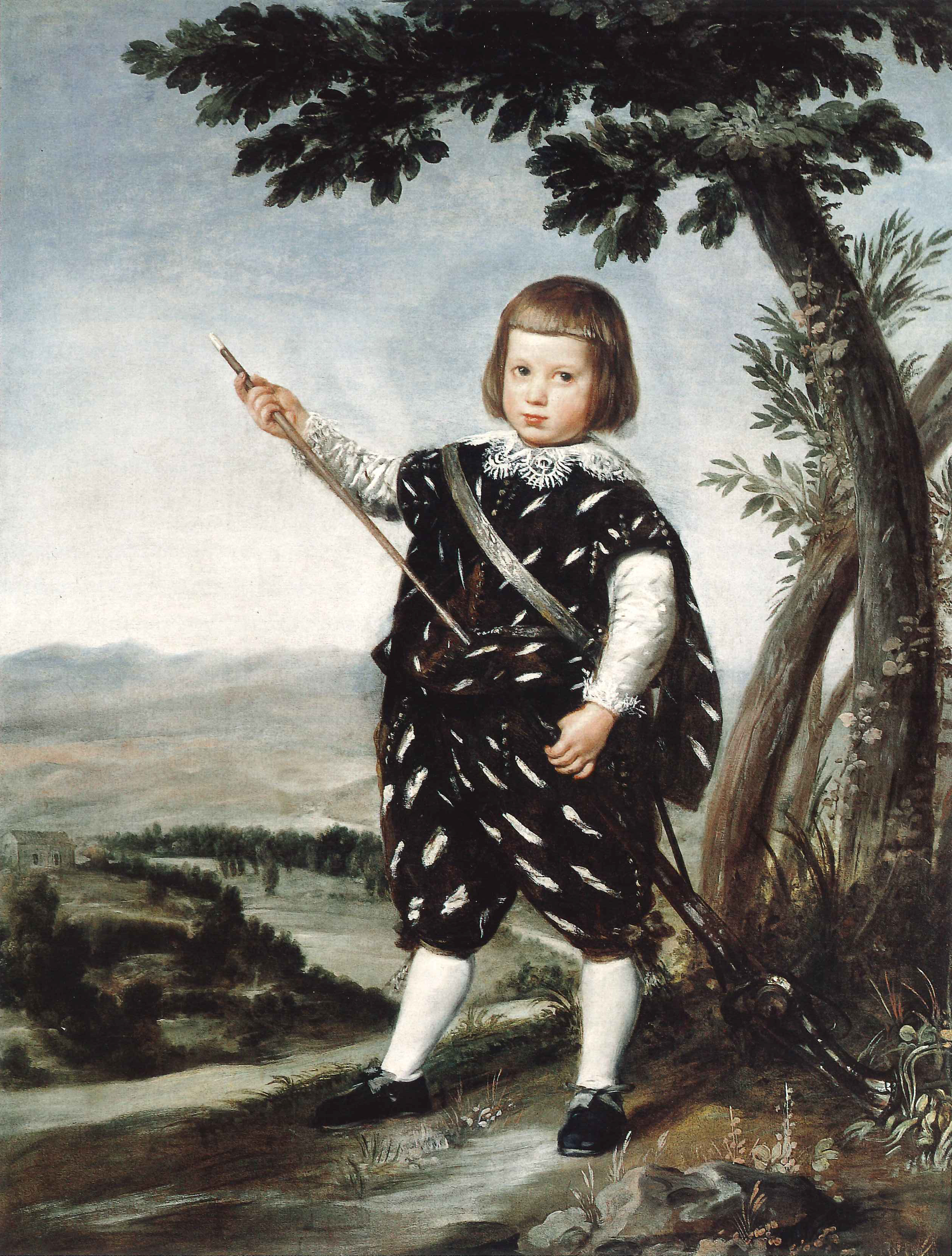
Portrait by Alonso Cano, 1633-1634

Inés de Zúñiga y Velasco, Countess of Olivares (wife of the Count-Duke of Olivares), who was also chief lady-in-waiting to the Queen, served as the prince's governess. Later, his father appointed Juan de Isasi Idiáquez, a noble from Salamanca, as the prince's governor and tutor. Balthasar Charles received a humanist education, as well as instruction in military arts. Alonso Martínez de Espinar trained him in hunting, while Juan Bautista Martínez del Mazo gave him drawing lessons. He was reportedly an outstanding pupil, with an aptitude for languages.

Queen Elisabeth played a significant role in Balthasar Charles's upbringing and education, encouraging the prince to develop interests in music and theatre. She adored her son, and he was "devotedly attached" to his mother. She fell ill in October 1644 and would not allow Balthasar Charles or his sister, Maria Theresa, to approach her on her deathbed, stating, "There are plenty of Queens for Spain, but Princes and Princesses are rare". She died a day later, on 6 October 1644.

Since his childhood, his mother, Queen Elisabeth, and Infanta Maria Anna, Holy Roman Empress, made the project of a marriage between Balthasar Charles and his cousin Archduchess Mariana of Austria, daughter of Holy Roman Emperor Ferdinand III and Infanta Maria Anna. Therefore, Emperor Ferdinand III wrote to Philip IV expressing his desire to offer the hand of his daughter Mariana in marriage to Prince Balthasar Charles and the king accepted. On the other hand, in 1638, the French noblewoman Marie de Rohan, duchess of Chevreuse, suggested a marriage between Balthasar Charles and his cousin Mary, Princess Royal, the daughter of his mother's sister, Henrietta Maria and her husband, King Charles I of England, but nothing materialized due to religious differences and because the Habsburgs were not even aware of this proposal, because Marie de Rohan made the suggestion only to the English monarch.

After the Catalan revolt of 1640, Philip IV tried to win over Aragon to raise money and men for the new war front. One of the steps taken towards this end was to bring Balthasar Charles to be sworn as Crown Prince of the Kingdom of Aragón. The oath was held on 20 August 1645, when the Prince was fifteen years old, in the Cathedral of the Savior, Zaragoza, and he was titled as Prince of Gerona, Governor General of Aragon, Duke of Montblanc, Count of Cervera and Lord of the City of Balaguer. Shortly after, on 13 November 1645, Balthasar Charles was also sworn as heir to the Kingdom of Valencia.

In April 1646, Philip IV, wanting his son to be sworn in as heir apparent to the throne of Navarre, as he had been in Aragon the previous year, moved with him from Madrid to Pamplona, where, after recognizing the privileges of the kingdom of Navarre, the ceremony was solemnly celebrated on 3 May 1646.

== Death ==
After the ceremony, the royal family moved to Zaragoza. On October 5, the eve of the second anniversary of the death of Queen Elisabeth, Philip IV and Balthasar Charles attended Vespers in her memory. The prince fell ill that evening and stayed in bed on October 6 while the king attended the funeral. On October 7, the king wrote to his spiritual advisor, Sister María de Ágreda, that the prince was suffering from severe fever and delirium, believed to be symptoms of smallpox. The disease spread rapidly, and two days later the Archbishop of Saragossa administered the Last Sacraments.

Prince Balthasar Charles died on 9 October 1646, a few days before his seventeenth birthday. His remains were kept in Zaragoza until October 16, when they were transferred to the Monastery of San Lorenzo de El Escorial.

Because Philip IV was left without a son or a wife and had only one legitimate daughter, Balthasar Charles's death was "a shattering blow to the monarchy". The king, facing mounting pressure to remarry for the sake of securing a male heir, consented to a second marriage with his son's former bride-to-be, Mariana of Austria.

== Depictions in art ==
The enduring image of Prince Balthasar Charles in art primarily stems from renowned portraits created by artists like Velázquez and Mazo. Notable among Velázquez's portrayals are "Prince Balthasar Charles on horseback," "Prince Balthasar Charles as a hunter," and "Prince Balthasar Charles with a dwarf" (located in the Museo del Prado and Museum of Fine Arts, Boston).

Moreover, many authors dedicated their work to the young prince. Examples include Diego de Saavedra Fajardo's most famous work, Idea of a Christian Political Prince represented in a Hundred Enterprises (1640), Cristóbal de Benavente y Benavides's Warnings for kings, princes and ambassadors (1643), and Baltasar Gracián's The Discreet (1646).

=== Gallery ===
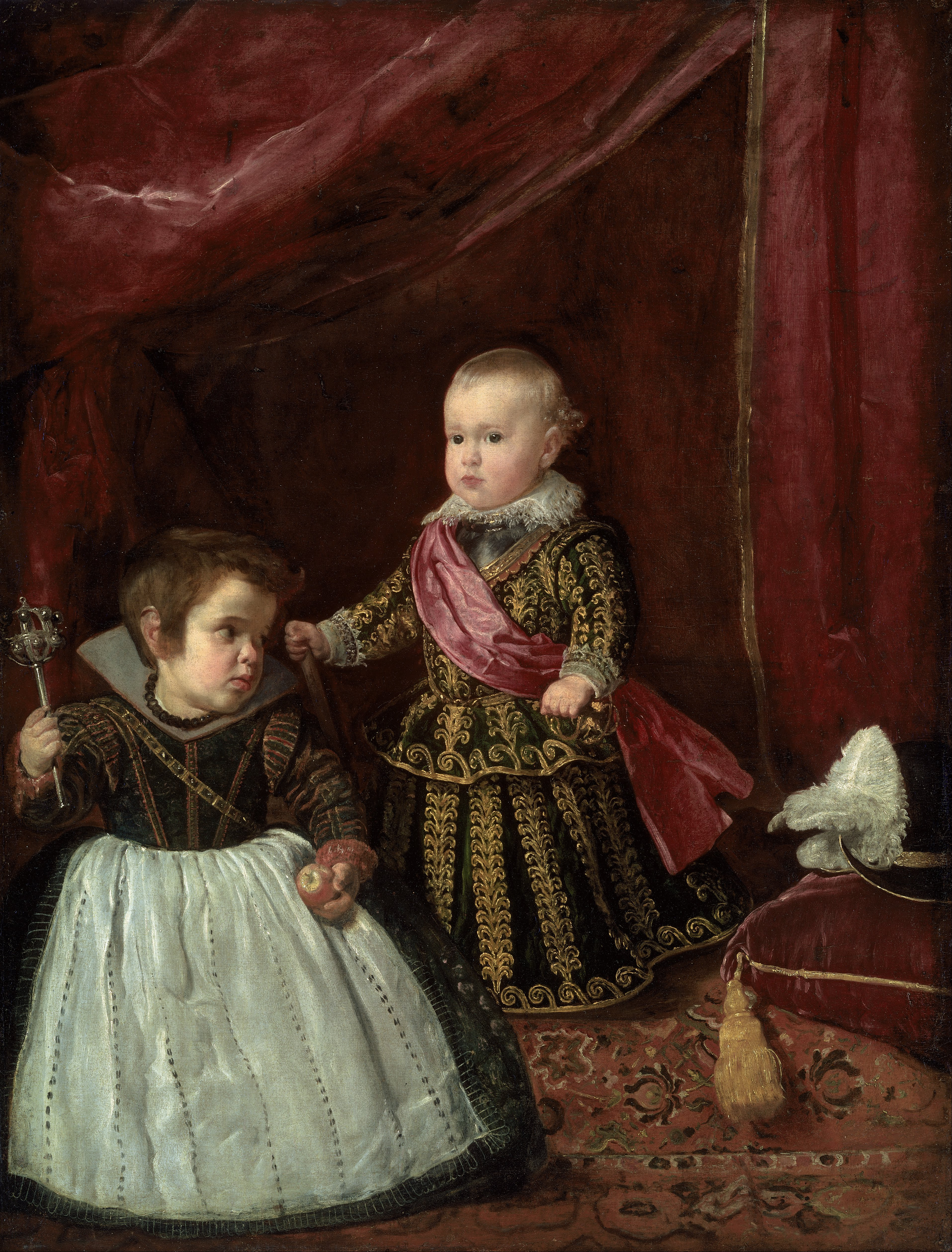
Balthasar Charles with a court dwarf, by Velázquez, 1631

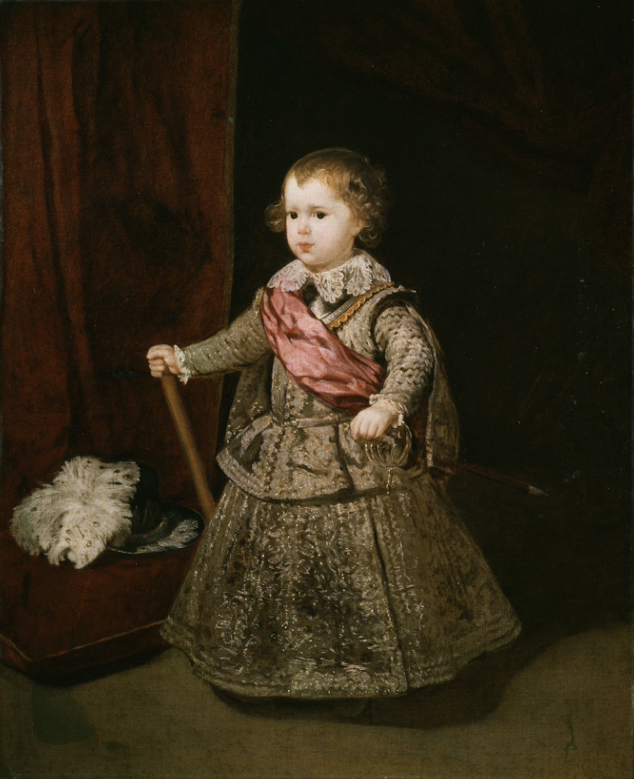
Balthasar Charles, with a sword, Marshall's baton and armour gorget, by Velázquez, 1633

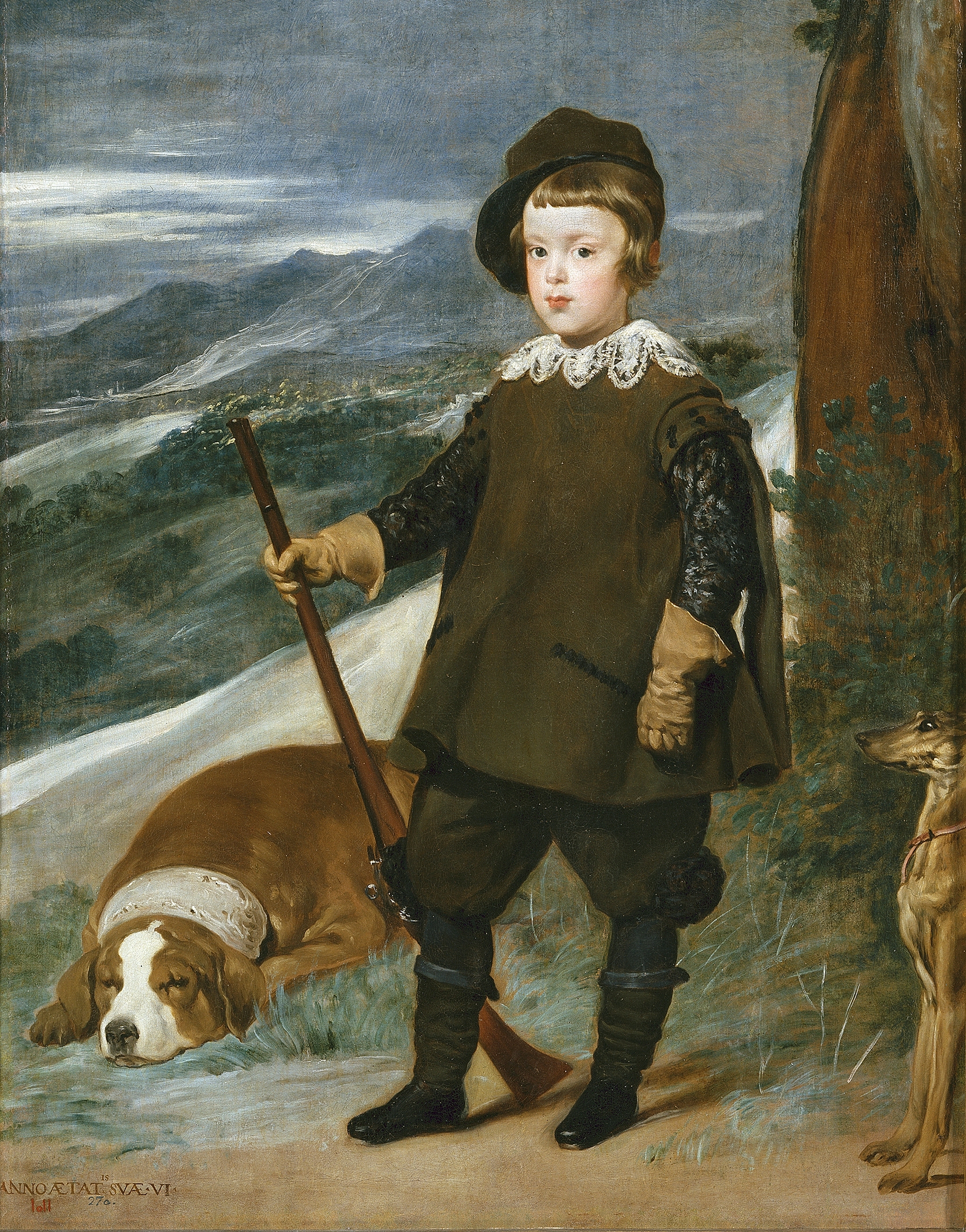
Balthasar Charles, in hunting attire, by Velázquez, 1635

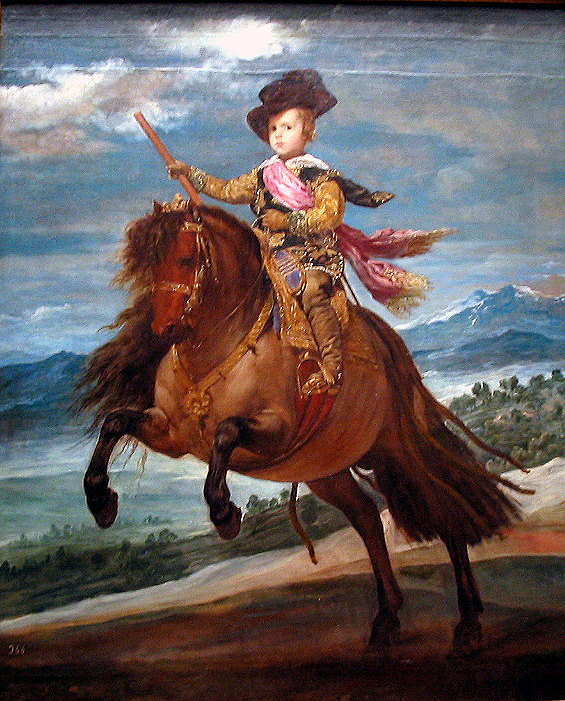
Balthasar Charles, in riding pose, by Velázquez, c. 1635

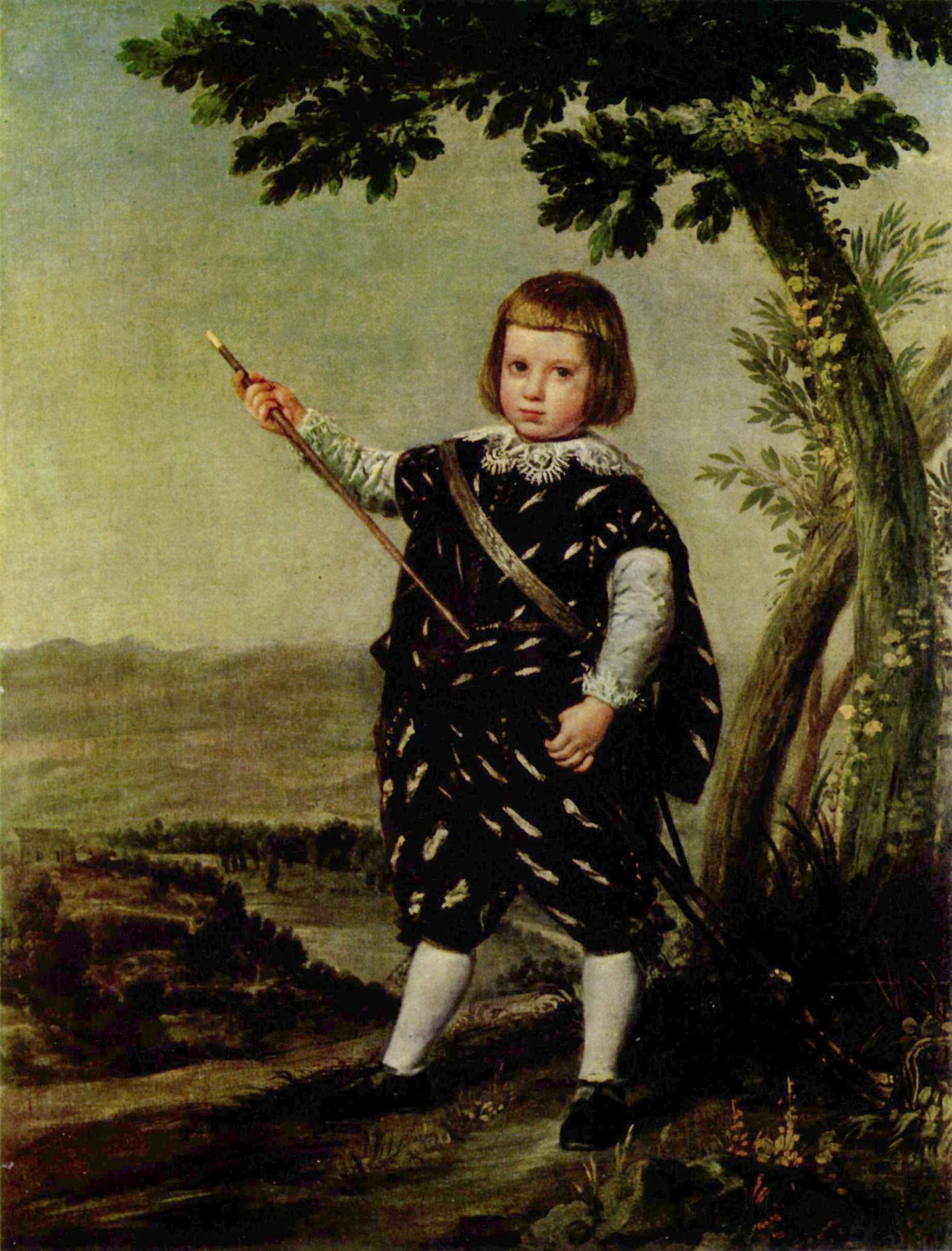
Balthasar Charles, in hunting attire, by Martínez del Mazo, 1635

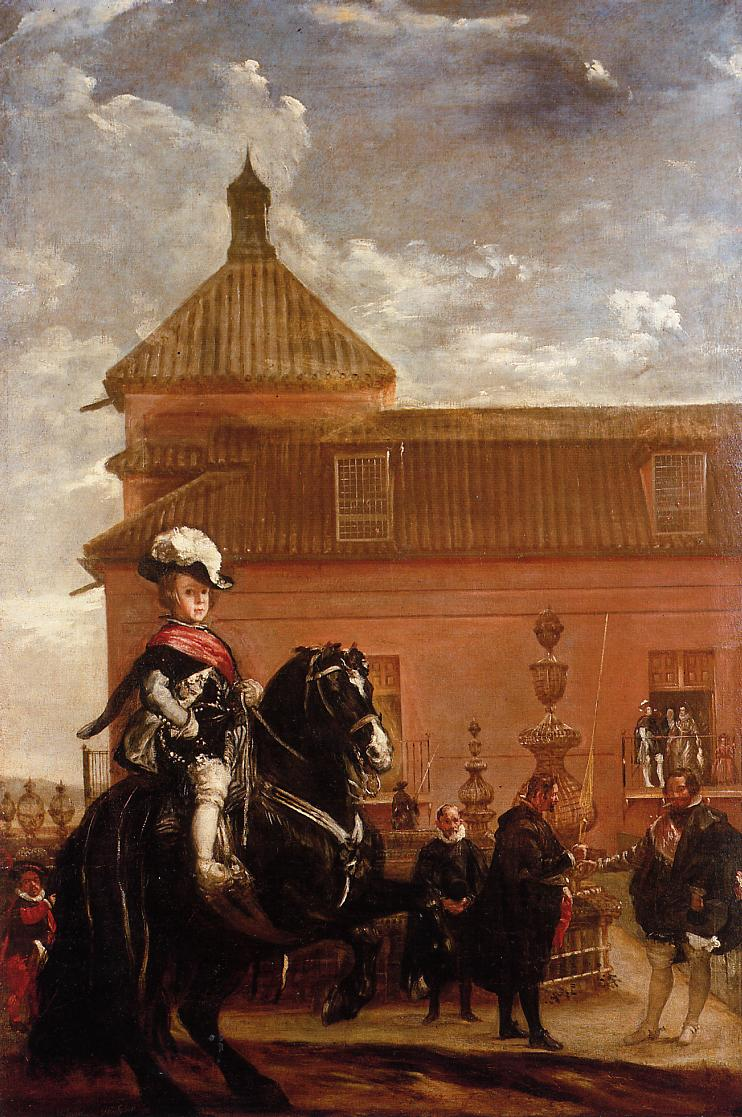
Prince Baltasar Carlos in the Riding School with the Count-Duke of Olivares outside Buen Retiro Palace, by Velázquez, c. 1636

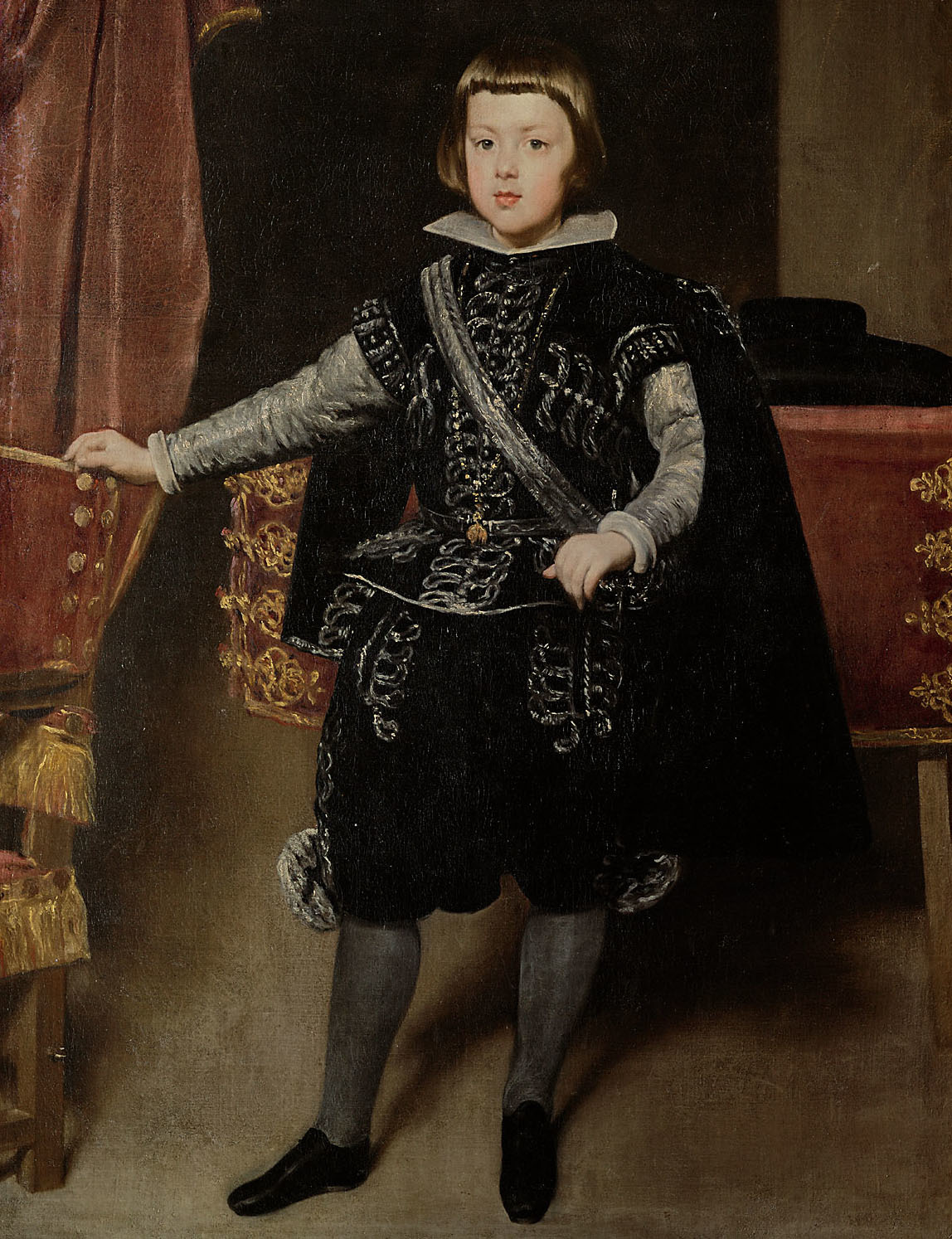
Balthasar Charles, by Velázquez, c. 1640

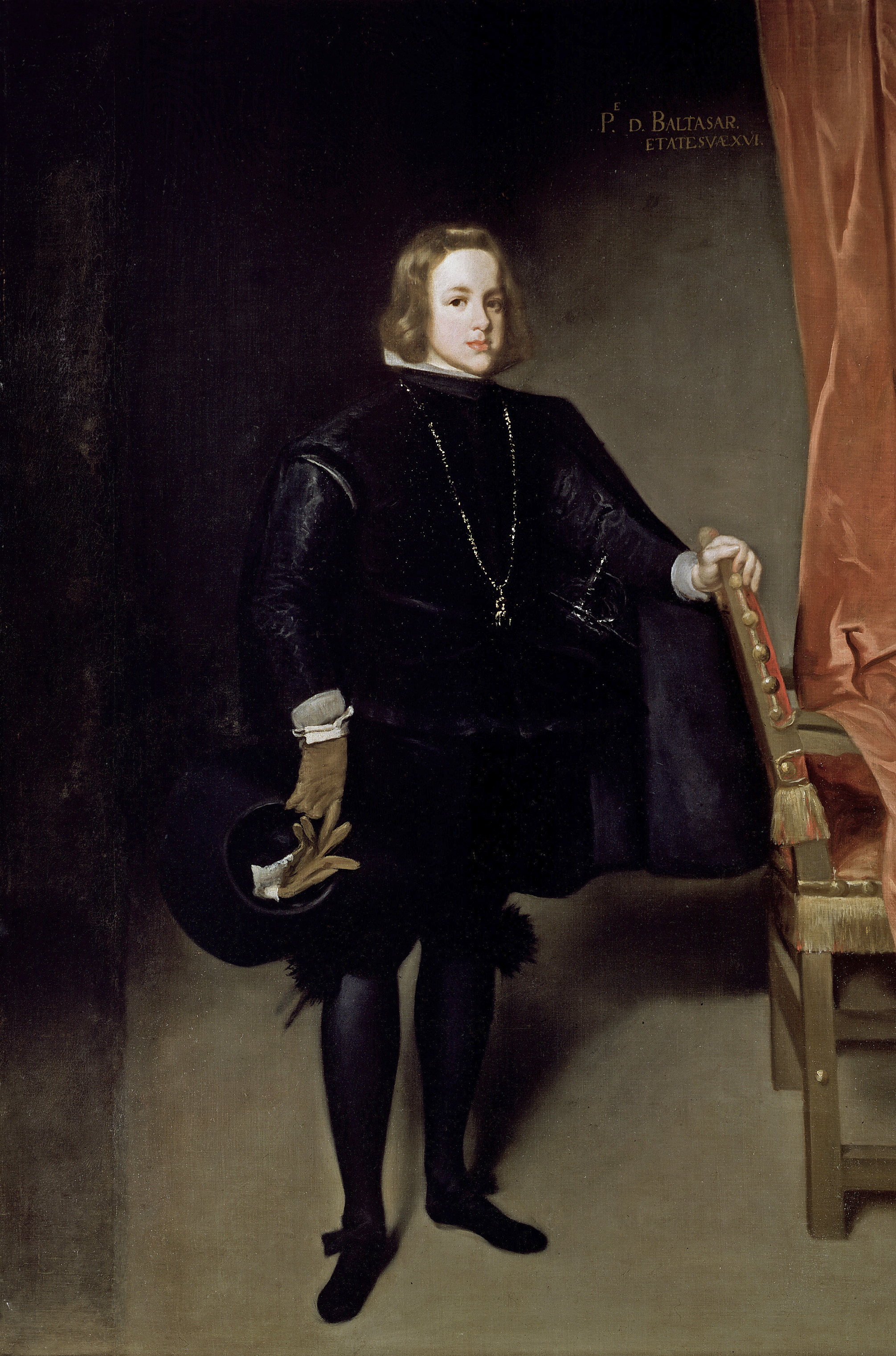
Portrait of Prince Baltasar Carlos, by Juan Bautista Martínez del Mazo, c. 1645-46

== Ancestry ==
Ancestors of Balthasar Charles, Prince of Asturias

8. Philip II of Spain
4. Philip III of Spain
9. Anna of Austria
2. Philip IV of Spain
10. Charles II, Archduke of Austria
5. Margaret of Austria
11. Maria Anna of Bavaria
1. Balthasar Charles, Prince of Asturias
12. Anthony of Navarre
6. Henry IV of France
13. Joan III of Navarre
3. Elisabeth of France
14. Francesco I de' Medici, Grand Duke of Tuscany
7. Marie de' Medici
15. Johanna of Austria

== Male-line family tree ==
House of Habsburg

Original line
Albert; Count of Habsburg c. 1188–1239
Rudolf I of Germany c. 1218–1291
Albert I of Germany; 1255–1308	Hartmann; 1263–1281	Rudolf II; Duke of Austria; 1270–1290
Rudolf I of Bohemia; 1281–1307	Frederick the Fair c. 1289–1330	Leopold I Duke of Austria; 1290–1326	Albert II; Duke of Austria; 1298–1358	Henry the Friendly; 1299–1327	Otto; Duke of Austria; 1301–1339	John; Parricida c. 1290–1312/1313
Albertinian line	Leopoldian line
Rudolf IV; Duke of Austria; 1339–1365	Frederick III; 1347–1362	Albert III; Duke of Austria; 1349–1395	Leopold III; Duke of Austria; 1351–1386	Frederick II; Duke of Austria; 1327–1344	Leopold II; Duke of Austria; 1328–1344
Albert IV; Duke of Austria; 1377–1404	William; Duke of Austria c. 1370–1406	Leopold IV; Duke of Austria; 1371–1411	Ernest; Duke of Austria; 1377–1424	Frederick IV; Duke of Austria; 1382–1439
Albert II of Germany; 1397–1439	Frederick III; HRE; 1415–1493	Albert VI; Archduke of Austria; 1418–1463	Sigismund; Archduke of Austria; 1427–1496
Ladislaus the Posthumous; 1440–1457	Maximilian I HRE; 1459–1519
Philip I of Castile; 1478–1506
Spanish / Iberian line	Austrian / HRE line
Charles V HRE; 1500–1558	Ferdinand I HRE; 1503–1564
Philip II of Spain; 1527–1598	Maximilian II; HRE; 1527–1576	Ferdinand II; Archduke of Austria; 1529–1595	Charles II; Archduke of Austria; 1540–1590
Carlos; Prince of Asturias; 1545–1568	Philip III of Spain; 1578–1621	Rudolf II; HRE; 1552–1612	Ernest of Austria; 1553–1595	Matthias; HRE; 1557–1619	Maximilian III; Archduke of Austria; 1558–1618	Albert VII; Archduke of Austria; 1559–1621	Wenceslaus; Archduke of Austria; 1561–1578	Andrew; Margrave of Burgau; 1558–1600	Charles; Margrave of Burgau; 1560–1618	Ferdinand II; HRE; 1578–1637	Maximilian Ernest of Austria; 1583–1616	Leopold V Archduke of Austria; 1586–1632	Charles of Austria; 1590–1624
Philip IV of Spain; 1605–1665	Charles of Austria; 1607–1632	Ferdinand of Austria; 1609–1641	John-Charles of Austria; 1605–1619	Ferdinand III; HRE; 1608–1657	Leopold Wilhelm of Austria; 1614–1662	Ferdinand Charles; Archduke of Austria; 1628–1662	Sigismund Francis; Archduke of Austria; 1630–1665
Balthasar Charles; Prince of Asturias; 1629–1646	Charles II of Spain; 1661–1700	Ferdinand IV; King of the Romans; 1633–1654	Leopold I HRE; 1640–1705	Charles Joseph of Austria; 1649–1664
Joseph I HRE; 1678–1711	Charles VI; HRE; 1685–1740
Lorraine
Maria Theresa; HRE; 1740–1780	Francis I HRE; 1745–1765
Habsburg-Lorraine
Joseph II; HRE; 1765–1790	Leopold II; HRE; 1790–1792
Francis II; HRE; 1792–1806

== Sources ==
- Alonso de la Higuera, Gloria (2013). "El ceremonial de la muerte en la monarquía hispánica. El príncipe don Baltasar Carlos de Austria (1629-1646)". In Serrano, Eliseo (ed.). De la tierra al cielo. Líneas recientes de investigación en Historia Moderna ["From Earth to Heaven. Recent Lines of Research in Modern History] (PDF) (in Spanish). Zaragoza: Institución Fernando el Católico. pp. 585–599. ISBN 978-84-9911-234-3.
- Brown, Jonathan (1980). A Palace for a King: The Buen Retiro and the Court of Philip IV. New Haven and London: Yale University Press.
- Coxe, William (1847). History of the House of Austria ... 1218-1792. Vol. II (third ed.). London: Henry G. Bohn. p. 349.
- John Dunlop (1834). Memoirs of Spain During the Reigns of Philip IV and Charles II, from 1621 to 1700. Vol. 1. Edinburgh: Thomas Clark.
- Elliott, John Huxtable (1986). The Count-Duke of Olivares, The Statesman in an Age of Decline. New Haven and London: Yale University Press. ISBN 0-300-03390-7.
- Franganillo, Alejandra (2014). "The Education of an Heir to the Throne: Isabel de Borbón and Her Influence on Prince Baltasar Carlos". In Coolidge, Grace (ed.). The Formation of the Child in Early Modern Spain. Ashgate. pp. 143–163.
- Hume, Martin (1907). Court of Philip IV: Spain in Decline. New York: G. P. Putnam's Sons.
- Pearce, Dominic (2015). Henrietta Maria. Amberley Publishing. ISBN 978-1-4456-4555-1.
- Piquer, Henri (1998). Francesco Antonio del Carretto, marquis de Grana, ambassadeur impérial en Espagne et conseiller de Philippe IV (Doctoral thesis). Paris: Université Paris X Nanterre.
- Monferrer, Serrano (2013). "Imagen e iconografía en las exequias del príncipe Baltasar Carlos en Zaragoza en 1646" [Image and Iconography in the Funeral Rites of Prince Baltasar Carlos in Zaragoza in 1646]. IMAGO Revista de Emblemática y Cultura Visual (in Spanish). pp. 101–109.
- Orso, Steven (1986). Philip IV and the Decoration of the Alcazar of Madrid. Princeton: Princeton University Press. ISBN 978-0-691-04036-3.
- Orso, Steven (1989). Art and death at the Spanish Habsburg Court: The Royal Exequies for Philip IV. Columbia: University of Missouri Press. ISBN 978-0-8262-0710-4.

Balthasar Charles, Prince of Asturias House of Habsburg Born: 17 October 1629 Died: 9 October 1646
Spanish royalty
Preceded by Philip	Prince of Asturias; 1629–1646	Succeeded by Philip Prospero
Preceded by Philip	Prince of Portugal; 1629–1640	Succeeded by Theodosius
