= Titus and Berenice =

1676 play

- Original language: English
- Written by: Thomas Otway
- Genre: Tragedy

Premiere
- Date: December 1676
- Place: Dorset Garden Theatre, London

Titus and Berenice is a 1676 tragedy by the English writer Thomas Otway. It portrays the relationship between the Roman Emperor Titus and the Jewish Queen Berenice. It premiered at the Dorset Garden Theatre, staged by the Duke's Company. It was inspired by Jean Racine's 1670 French work Bérénice.

The original cast included Thomas Betterton as Titus Vespatian, William Smith as Antiochus, Matthew Medbourne as Paulinus, John Crosby as Arsaces, Thomas Gillow as Rutilius, Mary Lee as Berenice and Elizabeth Barry as Phaenice. Another new work by Otway, a farce The Cheats of Scapin was performed as an afterpiece. Both plays were published together the following year and dedicated to the Earl of Rochester.

== Bibliography ==
- Van Lennep, W. The London Stage, 1660-1800: Volume One, 1660-1700. Southern Illinois University Press, 1960.
