= The Orphan (play) =

1680 play

The Orphan or The Unhappy Marriage is a domestic tragedy, written by Thomas Otway in 1680. It was first produced at the Dorset Garden Theatre, and starred Elizabeth Barry as Monimia, Thomas Betterton as Castalio, Thomas Gillow as Acasto, John Wiltshire as Paulino, Henry Norris as Ernesto, William Smith as Chamont, Thomas Percival as Chaplain, Margaret Osborne as Florella and Joseph Williams as Polydore. It precedes Venice Preserv'd and is therefore the first of Otway's two famous tragedies. Written in blank verse, it is the play that made Otway famous. The Orphan remained a stock piece on the stage until the 19th century. Thomas Otway was purported to have been deeply in love with Mrs. Barry, and it has been suggested that this play was inspired by this unrequited love.

== Plot ==
Half the youth of Europe is at war but Acasto, a nobleman retired from court and living in the country, encourages his sons Castalio and Polydore to stay home, study art and politics, and avoid the company of women. As well as having a daughter, Serina, Acasto is the guardian of a young girl, Monimia. Both Castalio and Polydore are in love with Monimia but Castalio, being the first-born twin, claims to have the right to woo her first. He secretly contracts himself to Monimia in marriage but Polydore overhears and makes plans to replace Castalio on the wedding night. Using the wedding-night signal of "three soft strokes on the chamber door" he is allowed access to Monimia's bedroom. When Castalio then attempts to enter the room using the same signal he is believed to be Polydore, and turned away. When everything is discovered and explained the next day, there is only the prospect of death for those involved. In the end, Polydore provokes Castalio into a duel and runs into his brother's sword on purpose, after which Monimia takes a fatal draught of poison and Castalio stabs himself.

== Prologue ==
In the prologue, Otway praises the Duke of York and congratulates him on his safe return from Scotland:

The baneful cloud's withdrawn,
And happiness again begins to dawn;
Since back with joy and triumph he is come,
That always drove fears hence, ne'er brought 'em home.
Oft has he ploughed the boist'rous ocean o'er,
Yet ne'er more welcome to the longing shore,
Not when he brought home victories before;
For then fresh laurels flourished on his brow,
And he comes crowned with olive branches now.
Receive him! Oh, receive him as his friends;

and dedicates the published edition of the play to the Duchess of York, suggesting strong Tory sympathies.

== Legacy ==
The song "Bad Review" on the 1997 album Voyage to the Bottom of the Road by English post-punk band Half Man Half Biscuit includes the line "Left to pick dry sticks and mumble to myself", a near-quote of "Picking dry sticks, and mumbling to herself" from The Orphan Act II Scene I.
