= Thomas Otway =

17th-century English writer and dramatist

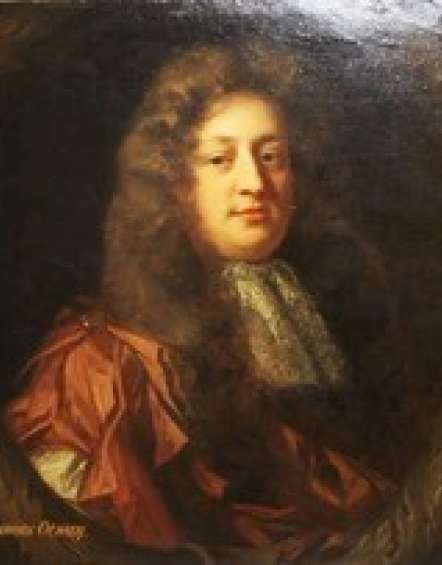
- Portrait of Thomas Otway by John Riley, c. 1680–85
- Born: 3 March 1652; Trotton, Sussex, England
- Died: 14 April 1685 (aged 33); London, England
- Burial place: St Clement Danes
- Occupation: Dramatist
- Years active: 1672–1685
- Known for: Venice Preserv'd

Thomas Otway (3 March 1652 – 14 April 1685) was an English dramatist of the Restoration period, best known for Venice Preserv'd, or A Plot Discover'd (1682).

== Life ==
Otway was born at Trotton near Midhurst, the parish of which his father, Humphrey Otway, was at that time curate. Humphrey later became rector of Woolbeding, a neighbouring parish, where Thomas Otway was brought up and expected to commit to priesthood. He was educated at Winchester College, and in 1669 entered Christ Church, Oxford, as a commoner, but left the university without a degree in the autumn of 1672. At Oxford he made the acquaintance of Anthony Cary, 5th Viscount Falkland, through whom, he says in the dedication to Caius Marius, he first learned to love books. In London he made acquaintance with Aphra Behn, who in 1672 cast him as the old king in her play, Forc'd Marriage, or The Jealous Bridegroom, at the Dorset Garden Theatre. However, due to severe stage fright, he gave an abysmal performance and never returned to the stage, instead opting to write what was being performed. The same year as the performance, his father died, triggering Otway to officially abandon any thoughts of priesthood and move to London to become a playwright, where he discovered his muse.

The muse he had fallen in love with was Elizabeth Barry, who played many of the leading parts in his plays. Six letters to her survive, the last of them referring to a broken appointment in the Mall. She seems to have flirted with Otway, but had no intention of permanently offending Rochester, her lover. In 1678, driven to desperation, Otway obtained a commission through Charles, Earl of Plymouth, a natural son of Charles II, in a regiment serving in the Netherlands. The English troops were disbanded in 1679, but were left to find their way home as best they could. They were paid with depreciated paper, and Otway arrived in London late in the year, ragged and dirty, a circumstance utilized by Elkanah Settle in his Sessions of the Poets.

Upon his return, he apparently ceased to struggle against his poverty and misfortunes. At one point in attempts to make money, he tutored the son of famed Restoration actress Nell Gwyn. The generally accepted story regarding the manner of his death was first given in Theophilus Cibber's Lives of the Poets. He is said to have emerged from his retreat at the Bull on Tower Hill to beg for bread. A passer-by, learning who he was, gave him a guinea, with which Otway hastened to a baker's shop. He ate too hastily, and choked on the first mouthful. Whether this account of his death is true or not, it is certain that he died in the utmost poverty, and was buried on 16 April 1685 in the churchyard of St. Clement Danes.

== Writing career ==
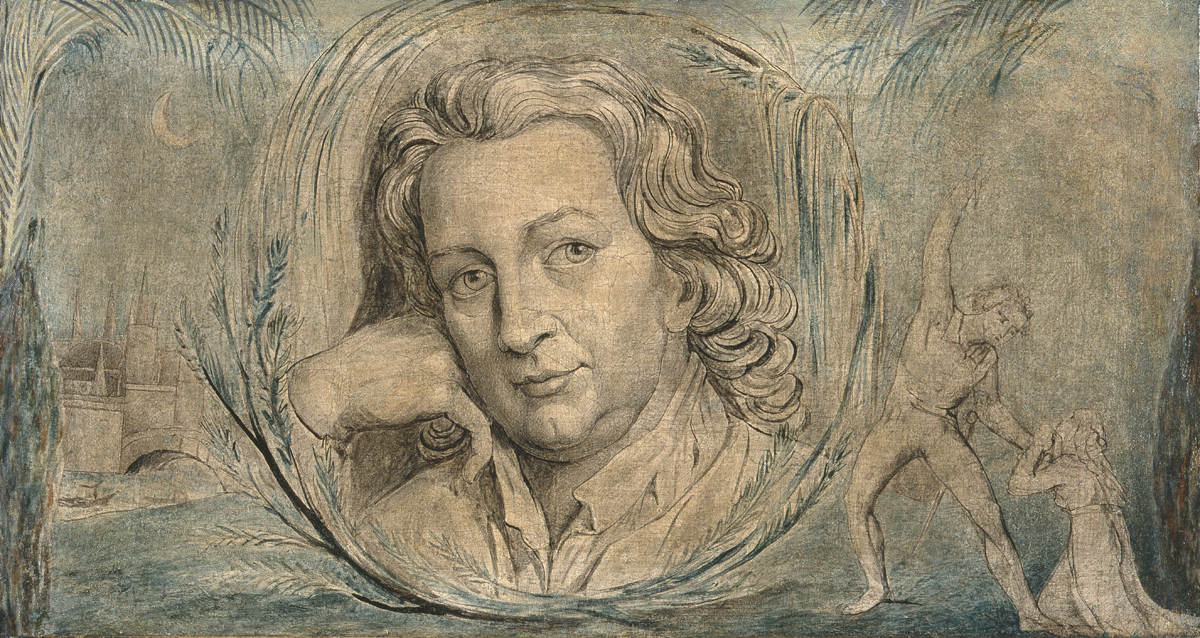
Portrait by William Blake, c. 1800

Otway was a prolific verse dramatist, writing in both rhyming couplets and blank verse. In 1675 Thomas Betterton produced Otway's first play, Alcibiades at the Dorset Garden Theatre, where all but one of his plays would eventually be produced. It is a tragedy, written in heroic verse, saved from absolute failure only by the actors. Elizabeth Barry took the part of Draxilla, and her lover, John Wilmot, 2nd Earl of Rochester, recommended Otway to the Duke of York (later King James II). He made a great improvement in Don Carlos, Prince of Spain (licensed 15 June 1676). The material for this rhymed tragedy came from the novel of the same name, written in 1672 by the Abbé de Saint-Real, the source from which Friedrich Schiller also drew his tragedy of Don Carlos. In it the two characters familiar throughout his plays make their appearance. Don Carlos is the impetuous, unstable youth, who seems to be drawn from Otway himself, while the queen's part is the gentle pathetic character repeated in his more celebrated heroines, Monimia and Belvidera. It got more money, says John Downes (Roscius Anglicanus, 1708) of this play, than any preceding modern tragedy.

In 1677 Betterton produced two adaptations from the French by Otway, Titus and Berenice (from Racine's Bérénice), and The Cheats of Scapin (from Molière's Scapin the Schemer). These were printed together, with a dedication to Rochester. In 1678 he produced an original comedy, Friendship in Fashion, which was very successful.

In February 1680, the first of Otway's two tragic masterpieces, The Orphan, or The Unhappy Marriage, was produced at the Dorset Garden, with Mrs. Barry playing the part of Monimia. Written in blank verse, modeled upon Shakespeare, its success was due to Otway's mastery of tragic pathos found in the characters of Castalio and Monimia. The History and Fall of Caius Marius, produced in 1679 and first printed in 1680, is a curious grafting of Shakespeare's Romeo and Juliet on the story of Marius as related in Plutarch's Lives. Caius Marius was incredibly popular during its time, outperforming Romeo and Juliet for at least seventy years following its initial release.

In 1680, Otway also published The Poets Complaint of his Muse, or A Satyr against Libells, in which he retaliated against his literary enemies and critics. An indifferent comedy, The Soldier's Fortune (1681), was followed in February 1682 by Venice Preserv'd, or A Plot Discover'd. The story is founded on the Histoire de la conjuration des Espagnols contre la Venise en 1618, also by the Abbé de Saint-Réal, but Otway modified the story considerably. The character of Belvidera is his own, and the leading part in the conspiracy, taken by Bedamor, the Spanish ambassador, is given in the play to the historically insignificant Pierre and Jaffeir. The piece has a political stance, with the narrative influenced by the fictitious conspiracy of the Popish Plot, which heightened anti-Catholic sentiments in England in favor of political advancement. His frustrations with such political scandals are evident in a caricature of Anthony Ashley Cooper, 1st Earl of Shaftesbury, a founder of the Whig party in the character of Antonio and in the play's "Prologue", in the following lines:

"Poland, Poland! Had it been thy Lot,
T'have heard in time of this Venetian Plot;
Thou surely chosen hadst one King from thence,
And honour'd them as thou hast England since."

The allusion is to rumours current at the time that Shaftesbury had planned to make himself King of Poland. Because of this, and the silver pipe John Locke had inserted into him to drain an abscess, he was popularly referred to as "Count Tapski".

Venice Preserv'd also contains an allusion to Rochester's famous deathbed conversion, as reported in Gilbert Burnet's Some Passages of the Life and Death of.. Rochester (1680). The conversion was doubted by many, and Otway is obviously skeptical, for when Pierre is on the scaffold, attended by a priest, he is made to say the following to his executioner (Act V, scene ii): "Captain, I'd have hereafter / This fellow write no Lies of my Conversion."

The play won instant success. It was translated into almost every European language, and even Dryden said of it: "Nature is there, which is the greatest beauty."

The Orphan and Venice Preserved remained stock pieces on the stage until the 19th century, and the leading actresses of the period played Monimia and Belvidera. His last and most obscure play is The Atheist (1684), although many see it as a way to cash in on his previous comic success with The Soldier's Fortune, some see it not as a weak sequel but as a "brilliant experiment." One of the aims of the play is to show what happens after the wedding as sentimental conclusion in plays of the period through the figures of Courtine and Sylvia. The bleakness of their relations taint those of Beauregard and Porcia. The complexity of the plot, some of which derives from the "Invisible Mistress," the first interpolated story in Paul Scarron's Roman comique, speak of the maze of human life, a meaningless world left for the audience to decipher. One or two prefaces, and two posthumous pieces, a poem, Windsor Castle (1685), a panegyric of Charles II, and a History of the Triumvirates (1686), translated from the French, complete the list of Otway's works. A tragedy entitled Heroick Friendship was printed in 1686 as Otway's work, but the ascription is unlikely.

The Works of Mr. Thomas Otway with some account of his life and writings, published in 1712, was followed by other editions (1722, 1757, 1768, 1812). Through the 19th century the standard edition was that by T. Thornton (1813).
