= Bembo (disambiguation) =

Bembo is a serif typeface.

Bembo may also refer to:

== People ==
- Bembo (family), a Venetian noble family
- Bernardo Bembo (1433 – 1519), Italian humanist and statesman
- Pietro Bembo (1470 – 1547), Italian scholar, poet, and cardinal
- Giovanni Bembo (1543 – 1618), Doge of Venice
- Antonia Bembo (c. 1640 – c. 1720), Italian singer and composer
- Giovanni Francesco Bembo (fl. 1515 – 1543), Italian painter

== Buildings ==
- Palazzo Bembo, a place in Venice
