= Antonio Foscarini =

Venetian ambassador

- Born: 1570; San Polo, Venice
- Died: 22 April 1622 (aged 51–52); Venice,
- Buried: Foscarini Chapel, San Stae, Venice
- Father: Nicolò di Alvise
- Mother: Maria Barbarigo di Antonio
- Occupation: Venetian ambassador to Paris and London

Antonio Foscarini (c. 1570 in Venice – 22 April 1622) belonged to the Venetian nobility and was Venetian ambassador to Paris and later to London. He was the third son of Nicolò di Alvise of the family branch of San Polo and Maria Barbarigo di Antonio. In 1622 he was sentenced to death for high treason by the Council of Ten and executed.

Ten months later, the same council rehabilitated Antonio Foscarini and explicitly informed the European courts of his posthumous exoneration, and the revocation of the guilty verdict and death sentence. Notwithstanding the about turn, mystery still remains as to why an art-loving nobleman was embroiled in a Venetian tale of political intrigue, that involved factional infighting, institutional disputes between Church and State, and religious hostilities over Protestantism and Catholicism at the beginning of the Thirty Years' War, that led to the death of an innocent man.

== Background and early political career ==
Antonio Foscarini had two brothers, Alvise (1560–1617) and Girolamo (1561–1580), and three sisters, Caterina, Agnesina, and Lucia Contarini. The Foscarini family lost a substantial part of their wealth, from the Ottoman–Venetian War (1570–1573) and only the sons received financial support. His father Nicolò died in 1575, and his mother died in 1582, probably by suicide.

Antonio studied in Padua, where he made several lifelong friendships. From 1590 he and his remaining brother Alvise led the household, and in 1592 they agreed to share the considerable fortune of about 70,000 ducats that remained. The family property included estates in Padua, Mestrino, Verona and Venice, including the family home in San Polo. In 1595 Foscarini gained a seat in the Grand Council and in September 1597 was elected to the 'Savio agli Ordini', - the lowest level in the council of ministers the 'Collegio' - where he was witness to the factional infighting between 'conservatives' and 'innovators', the two opposing groups of the nobility. He became a supporter of the 'innovator' Paolo Sarpi.

== Diplomatic career ==
Foscarini began his political career as an envoy to the court of Henry IV of France in 1601 and was present at the king's marriage to Maria de Medici. On 26 May 1607 he was appointed as ambassador to France but did not assume the role until February the next year. He reported the activities of English diplomats, including "Signor Ghintrot" (Henry de Gunderot), an envoy who received a letter in July 1608 suggesting that Anne of Denmark was displeased with Henry IV. In July 1610, Foscarini was made ambassador to England, but here too he delayed taking up the position until 4 May the following year.

These delays in taking up his two appointments formed part of the accusations against him during his two trials, but it was found that he otherwise behaved fittingly. Accusations that he dressed poorly and was stingy were not trivial matters in the estates society. His opposition to the Pope and the Jesuit order was no secret.

In June 1611 Foscarini wrote that Anne of Denmark had received a jewel with the initials "C4" set in diamonds from her brother Christian IV of Denmark. She gave the outgoing Venetian ambassador Marc' Antonio Correr a box with pearls, a diamond ring with the royal portraits, and jewels to his son Vincenzo. He had a private audience with Anne of Denmark in a gallery at Hampton Court in July. There was music, and she talked of her family. In November he watched a tournament from a palace window with Anne of Denmark. King James rode by and called him down, and showed animals in his menagerie.

Sir John Throckmorton reported Foscarini's arrival at Vlissingen in May 1612, on his way to Brussels. Throckmorton said he was "an honest proper man, for he speaketh well of us (the English), and seemeth not to be much affected to the Spaniards". Anne of Denmark and Honora, Lady Hay enjoyed the company of Foscarini's secretary Giulio Muscorno, an accomplished musician who joined him in England in June 1612. In August 1612 Foscarini followed the king on his progress and went to Apethorpe, Burleigh, and Belvoir Castle, where the 5 August anniversary of the Gowrie House Conspiracy was celebrated. He visited Walter Cope at Holland House and hunted with him at Hyde Park. Cope was a cousin of Dudley Carleton, ambassador in Venice.

Foscarini attended the wedding of Princess Elizabeth and Frederick V of the Palatinate on 14 February 1613 at Whitehall Palace and wrote a full description.

An Italian poet, Antimo Galli, wrote of an embarrassing incident while Foscarini was at a play. At the end of the performance, it was customary for the audience to shout out the name of the play they next wanted to see. Foscarini joined in, but his costume and shouts drew attention to himself. The audience thought he was Spanish and began to whistle at him.

=== Visiting Scotland ===
Foscarini had an audience with King James at Beaulieu in August 1613 and discussed his forthcoming visit to Scotland, and James was delighted that he would see the country where he was born. Muscorno was sent to London to fetch money for the Scottish journey. Foscarini went to see Anne of Denmark at Wells and discussed her love of Scotland. He had a Scottish servant, William Lumsden. In September he took leave from his post and went to Scotland, and saw Newcastle-upon-Tyne busy with ships and the deserted fortifications of Berwick-upon-Tweed on the way. He visited Haddington, Edinburgh, Glasgow, Stirling, Falkland, and Linlithgow. Business recalled him to Edinburgh, where he met Alexander Seton, 1st Earl of Dunfermline. He returned to King James at Theobalds on 10 October full of enthusiasm for the beauty and strength of the northern kingdom. In August 1614 he met Christian IV of Denmark in London, who was dressed in the French fashion.

=== Leaving London ===
Lewis Lewknor took Foscarini to hunt deer for two days in September 1615 in Waltham Forest. Foscarini described an audience with Anne of Denmark in October 1615 at Greenwich Palace. She told him she preferred that Prince Charles would marry a French princess rather than a Spanish infanta. Foscarini said farewell to King James on 20 November, and waited to take his leave of Anne of Denmark who was unwell. He introduced his successor as ambassador, Gregorio Barberigo, to her at Greenwich. This was a grand occasion and the ambassadors were escorted to the palace by the Queen's Master of Horse Thomas Somerset. Foscarini met the Queen again in a gallery at Greenwich on 4 December for a more private audience, accompanied only by the Mistress of the Robes, Audrey Walsingham, and his secretary, Giovanni Rizzardo. Anne of Denmark sent him a diamond ring. King James allowed him to add the lion of England to his coat of arms and gave him some silver gilt plate. Although he had made his formal farewells, King James summoned him for an audience at Newmarket on 12 December. On his return to London he was laid low with a cold for a few days and then sailed home.

== First Arrest ==
Foscarini and his secretary Giulio Muscorno quarrelled in 1613, perhaps over the favour Muscarno received from Anne of Denmark. Muscorno beat William Lumsden, Foscarini's Scottish servant, and accused Foscarini of inciting Lumsden to murder him. A manuscript the Sayings and Doings of Antonio Foscarini circulated in London damaging his character, which was thought to be the work of Muscorno and Giovanni Francesco Biondi.

On 20 February 1615 Muscorno wrote to the Council of Ten, accusing Foscarini of selling state secrets to Spain. When Muscorno returned to Venice in August he was arrested. His replacement, Giovanni Rizzardo, was requested to secretly gather evidence against Foscarini. Rizzardo was unable to secure a copy of the manuscript libel. He seems to have sided with Foscarini and reported that Anne of Denmark and Lady Hay had helped their friend Muscarno to cast shade on the ambassador.

Foscarini was arrested on his arrival in Venice. Three years later he was released without charge and formally absolved on 30 July 1618. In London between January 1616 and June 1617 his successor as ambassador to England, Gregorio Barbarigo, and his secretary Lionello, had searched in vain for evidence against him. In 1620 Foscarini was elected to the senate.

== Countess of Arundel and the Second Arrest ==
In 1621, Alethea Howard, Countess of Arundel, reached Venice. She was the granddaughter of Elizabeth of Hardwick, a goddaughter of Queen Elizabeth I, and wife of Thomas Howard, 21st Earl of Arundel, a leading person at the court of King James I of England. Foscarini was a friend of the art-loving couple from London and visited the pair at the Palazzo Mocenigo on the Grand Canal where they were staying.

On 8 April 1622 Foscarini was arrested leaving the Senate. The Council of Ten accused him of meeting with ministers of foreign powers, both in Venice and abroad, and of betraying in words and in writing the most intimate secrets of the Republic. Foscarini was accused of disclosing state secrets to the secretary of Emperor Ferdinand II and to the nuncio of the Pope at the Arundel residence. The agents of the State Inquisition, Domenico and Girolomo Vano were the key witnesses. These, in turn, had received their information from Gian Battista, the servant of the Spanish Ambassador.

Sir Henry Wotton, England's ambassador to Venice, wrote to Arundel that the Senate would declare her an 'unwanted person' and advised her to leave the city immediately. Instead, she hurried to Wotton and requested an audience with Doge Antonio Priuli. She threatened the ambassador, whom she suspected of being involved in the action of the Council of Ten to call for her removal. In fact, she was not only admitted to the Doge, but he assured her that no one wanted to banish her, and promised to restore the honor of Foscarini by writing to London. Six months later she left Venice, bestowed with gifts from the Doge.

== Trial ==
The account of the advocate Andrea Querini: The case against Foscarini was preceded by about twelve processes of small consequence that began with letters from England in 1605 written to the Supreme Tribunal by his secretary Giulio Muscorno. Foscarini was said to have incurred the hatred of the King and Court by imprudent discourse to the detriment of public affairs. He wrote to defend himself and Muscorno replied that he went in danger of his life from the ambassador. Subsequently, Foscarini was accused of corresponding with foreigners, and the greater part of the process turned upon this, but in the absence of real proof, only a caution was issued. In 1622, informers declared to the tribunal to have repeatedly seen Foscarini talking with the Spanish ambassador under a certain 'sottoportico in Canareggio'. When questioned Foscarini did not deny the place or the hour but the person and the fact. A presumption of his guilt being established, he was condemned. Giovan Battista Nani describes these events in his Historia della Republica Veneta, published in the latter half of the century, but his account contains inaccuracies, as Foscarini's arrival in England was after the beginning of May 1611 and Muscorno's letters were sent in 1613.

Despite the assurances of the Doge given earlier to the Countess Arundel, Foscarini was convicted on 22 April. He was strangled in jail and his body was, in the manner usual for those convicted of high treason, hung head down between the pillars in the Piazzetta. Before being so hung, his body had been dragged along the ground, from morning to dusk by one leg.

== Rehabilitation ==
Meanwhile, one of the inquisitors was suspicious and had interrogated the Spanish servant further, whereby he confessed to not having seen Foscarini in the Spanish ambassador's house. Girolamo, who had received a salary on 23 May for services not mentioned, and Domenico Vano, were both summoned and interviewed in August. They confessed to a conspiracy to discredit Foscarini, but the redacted court records reveal no motive, nor who may have been behind the conspiracy.

The Vano pair were convicted but before they were executed, the Foscarini nephews, Nicolò and Girolamo Foscarini, had petitioned the Council of Ten for further interrogation to reveal any co-conspirators, but this was declined. The English ambassador suspected this suggested either the statements of the convicted were of no value, or there were reasons of state.

On 16 January 1623, ten months after the Council of Ten had convicted Antonio Foscarini of high treason, he was exonerated of all charges by the same council.

The prosecutors were brought before the State Inquisition and the Council of Ten. The latter publicly acknowledged their error. Copies of the corresponding letters were sent to the Foscarini family and to all the estates in Europe.

Foscarini was exhumed and reburied with a state funeral. A statue was erected in the Foscarini Chapel in the church of San Stae on the Grand Canal. The Doge Marco Foscarini (1762-1763), a descendant of Antonio's brother Alvise, praised the Council of Ten for revoking its earlier judgment.

== Background ==
Antonio Foscarini was a follower of the so-called 'Giovani', a group in the Venetian nobility with sympathy for the Protestant rulers who supported them during the Thirty Years' War. When Foscarini was an ambassador to London, he made friends with Sir Henry Wotton (later to become British ambassador to Venice) and formed a formal alliance with England.

In addition, Venice had drawn the consequences in a lawsuit since 1605 and banished Theatines, Capuchins and Jesuits from its dominion. In return, the Pope had imposed on 17 April 1606, the Interdict on Venice. When this was abolished in 1607, the Jesuits were not allowed to return. The Venetian Republic challenged Papal authority and mistrusted the Jesuit order, with its strong Spanish ties. Venice resented Spanish power and her league with Florence, Milan and Naples. Savoy was the only other Italian state not subject to Spanish supremacy. Paolo Sarpi led an anti-papal group, opposing temporal privileges of the Pope.

The conflict between the 'Giovani' (the boys), and their opponents, the 'Vecchi', (the ancients), also Papists was an important background to Foscarini's conviction. Until the death of Doge Leonardo Donato (1606-1612), 'the boys' dominated, but until 1631 they had intermittent influence.

The Habsburgs, leaders of the Counter-Reformation forces, involved Venice in a war under the leadership of Archduke Ferdinand, who in 1617 entered into the Treaty of Madrid. The Spanish Viceroy in Naples, the Duke of Osuna, allowed his ships to continue attacks against Venetian merchants in the Adriatic Sea. The allegations about the supposed Bedmar Conspiracy and coup attempt saw three men executed summarily, and the courts condemned more than a hundred more for treason. Giambattista Bragadino, a member of the impoverished nobility, the so-called Barnabotti, having confessed to contact with the Spanish ambassador, was also executed.

The denunciation of Antonio Foscarini by his secretary Giulio Muscarno, and subsequent arrest in 1615 had come in the midst of this crisis. He was eventually acquitted of selling information to the Spaniards but only after three years in detention. Muscarno was stripped of his office and sentenced to two years in prison.

Foscarini's second denunciation in 1622 may have arisen from first indictment, his Protestant sympathies, the antipathy of his secretary Muscarno, or the general fear of Spain's intrigue, but which of these, is impossible to ascertain.

Since 1310 the Council of the Ten dealt with cases of high treason. For both important dates, the day of the conviction (22 April 1622) and day of the rehabilitation (16 January 1623), the composition of the Council of the Ten is known. This Council of Ten, which had six councilors in addition to the Doge, consisted of ten senators, although a total of 17 men participated at the meetings. From their circle these determined three administrators of state, or 'Avogadori di Commun', one of whom would be a council of the Doge, the other two were elected by the senators. The three 'Avogadori' retained numerous informers, informants and henchmen, paid for from their own cash funds, and kept no records. The senate election to the council were for one year terms, but the term commencement dates varied, so the Council composition changed monthly, but gradually.

Doge Antonio Priuli, Alvise Contarini, Francesco Molin and Battista Nani were all possible Papists, but the number of Papist members of the Council in 1622 cannot be determined.

In 1623, the presidents, (Capi), were Anzolo da Mosto, Marcantonio Mocenigo and Nicolò Contarini. According to Sarpi, Contarini was one of the brains of the Giovani, and Mocenigo supported them. Only Battista Nani, the third to sign the rehabilitation, was not one of them. Nani had been in the Council of Ten at the time of the sentencing of 1622, but had been one of four who voted for imprisonment and not execution.

Vincenzo Dandolo, like Nani, was present at both sessions. He was an old acquaintance of Contarini and probably owed him his Senate seat, and they had fought together in the Gradisca War 1615–1617. He had sought the harshest condemnation, and in 1623, voted for rehabilitation.

Whether the 'Giovani' and 'Papalisti' rivalry was behind the execution and rehabilitation is unknown. In 1622 Foscarini was so discredited that Paolo Sarpi had publicly declined the 100 ducats from the legacy of Foscarini, provided in his Will, on the eve of the execution for Sarpi's prayers. Sarpi may have rejected the inheritance in the belief of his guilt, or he may have feared for himself and his group.

== Literature ==
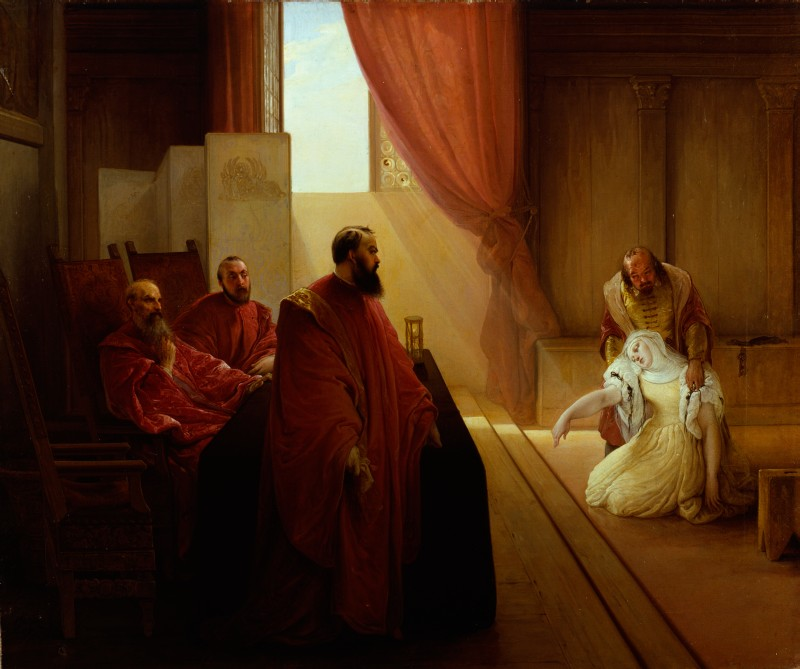
Valenza Gradenigo before the Inquisition, by Francesco Hayez (1791–1882)

- Giovanni Battista Niccolini: Antonio Foscarini: tragedia, Florence 1823. The play was inspired by strong anti-tyrannical and patriotic spirit of the times. It was first performed on 8 February 1827 at Teatro Niccolini (formerly 'Teatro Cocomero') in Florence.
- Ida von Reinsberg-Düringsfeld : Antonio Foscarini, 4 vols, Stuttgart 1850.
- Jonathan Walker: "Antonio Foscarini in the City of Crossed Destinies", in: Rethinking History, Vol. 5, No. 2, 2001, pp. 305–334.
- Murray Brown: "The Myth of Antonio Foscarini's Exoneration", in: Renaissance and Reformation / Renaissance et Reforms. Société Canadienne d'Etudes de la Renaissance 25/3 (2001) 25–42.
