= Tallemant =

Tallemant may refer to:

- François Tallemant l'Aîné
- Gédéon Tallemant des Réaux (1619-1692), French writer
