= Tendre =

Tendre can refer to:

- Map of Tendre, French map of fictional country Tendre
- Mont Tendre, mountain in Jura, Switzerland
- In musical directions, tenderly; see Glossary of musical terminology#T
