= Nicolò Donato =

Doge of Venice in 1618

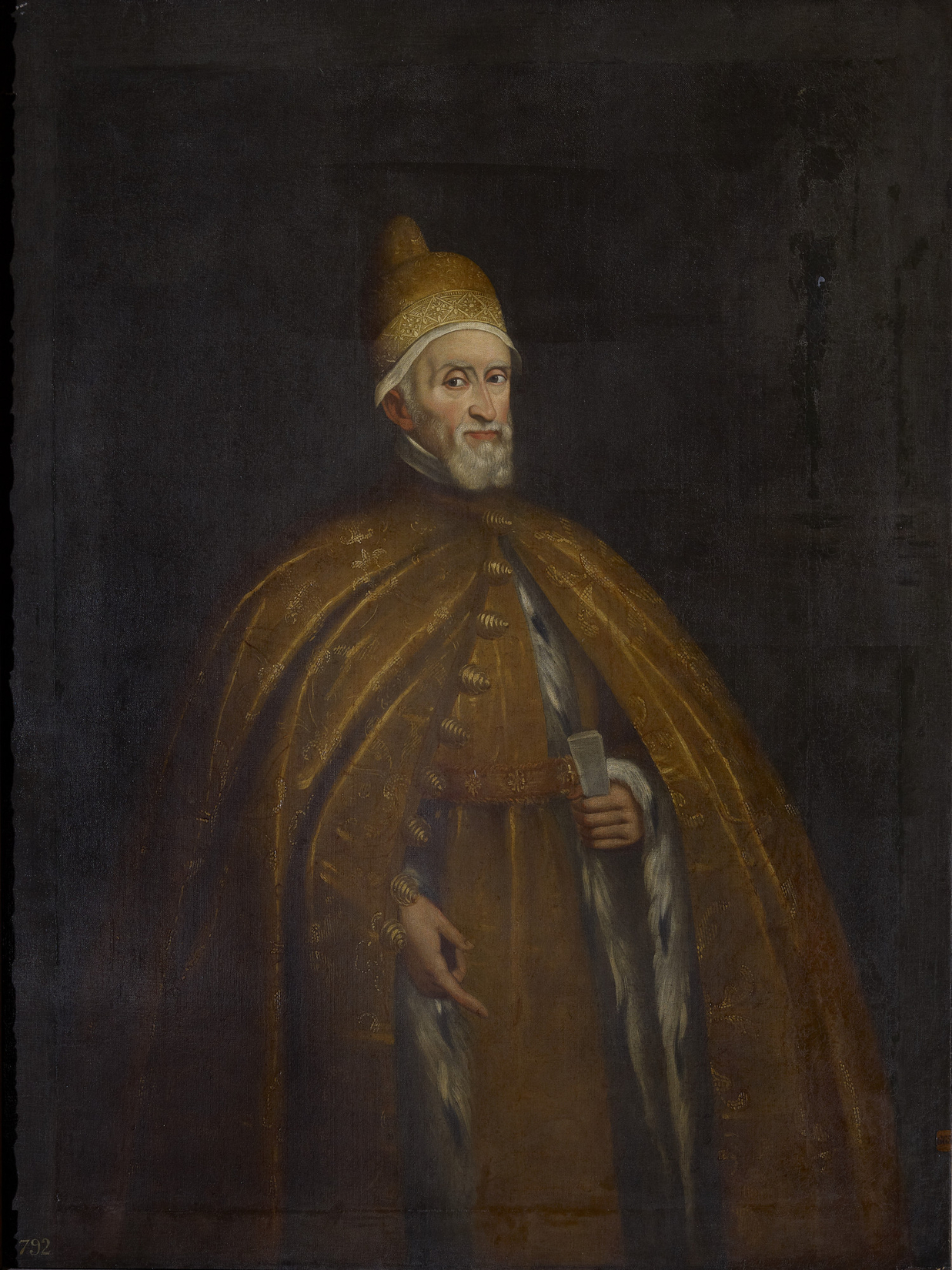
Nicolò Donato

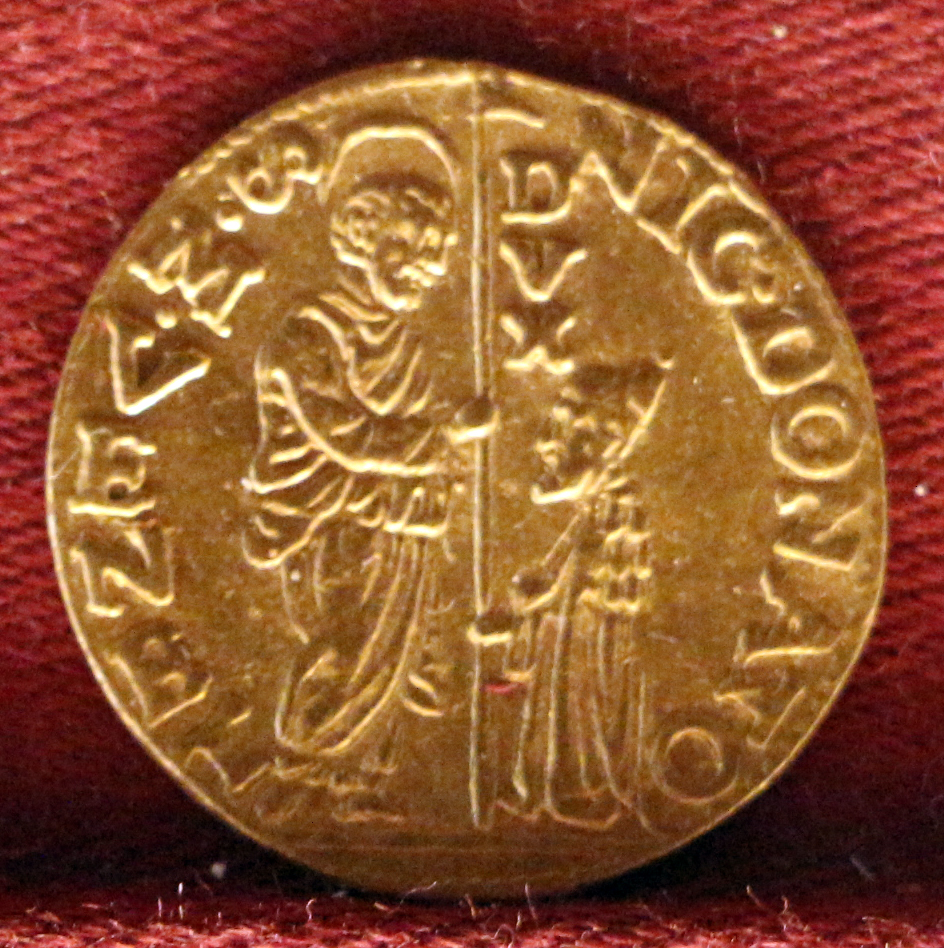
Nicolò Donà zecchino

Nicolò Donà or Nicolò Donato (28 January 1539 – 8 May 1618) was the 93rd Doge of Venice, reigning for just over a month, from his election on 5 April 1618 until his death.

== Biography ==
The son of Giovanni Donà and Isabetta Morosini, Donato was born in Venice and studied for a time in Padua before going into trade. He gained a huge fortune, but remained stingy his entire life. He never married, and ultimately left his fortune to his brother Francesco and nephew Pietro.

Donato was initially unwilling to spend the money required to gain high office in the Republic of Venice, but after the Doge Giovanni Bembo died on 16 March 1618, Donato was elected his successor on 5 April 1618. He tried to eliminate his reputation for stinginess by throwing the traditional lavish banquet to celebrate his election, but this proved unavailing when his parents turned a number of his relatives away from the feast in order to save money. He died in Venice 35 days after his election, and the position was vacant at the outset of the Bedmar Conspiracy allegations.

Political offices
| Preceded by Giovanni Bembo | Doge of Venice; 1618 | Succeeded by Antonio Priuli |
