= Paul Tallement the Younger =

French writer (1642–1712)

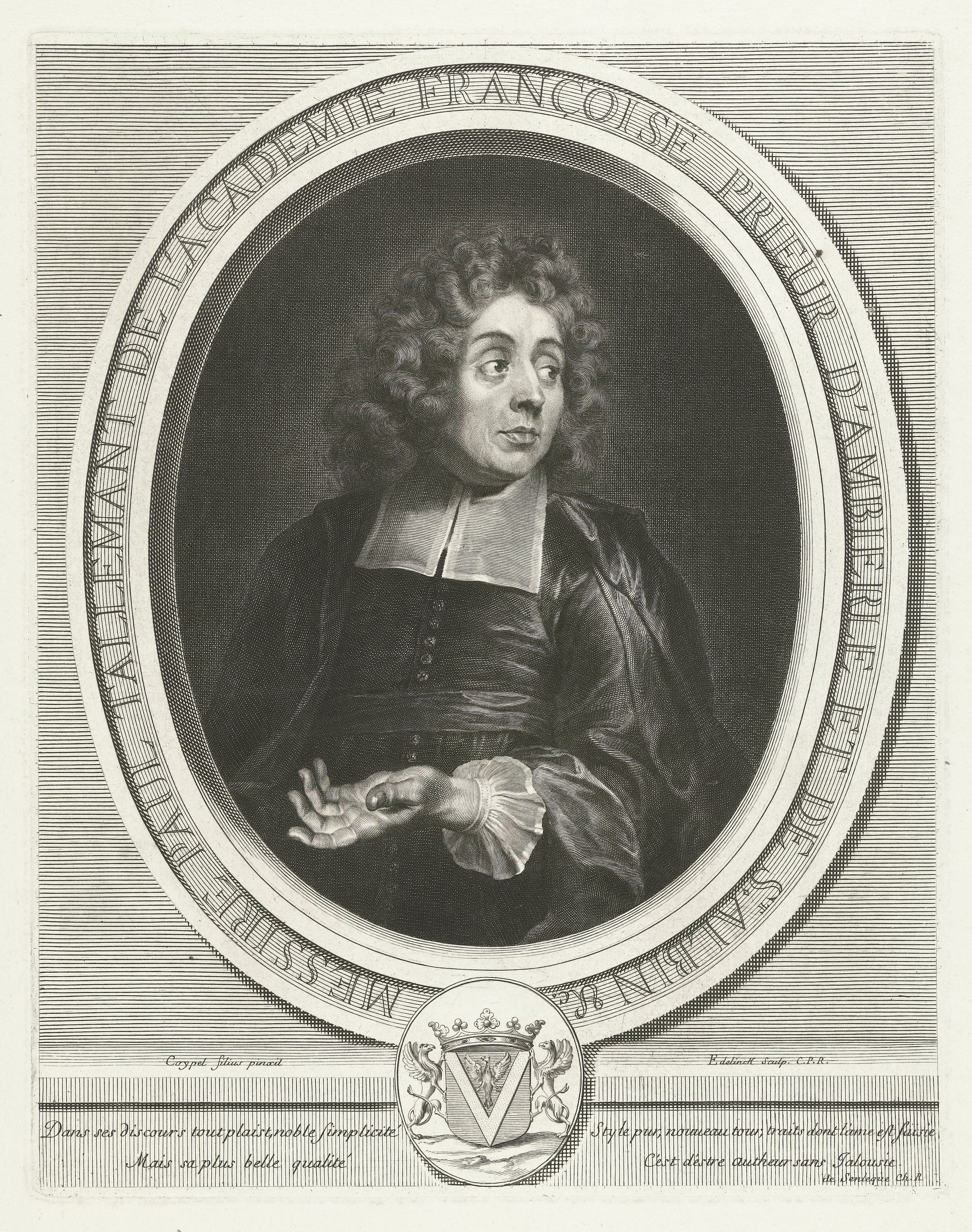
Portrait of Paul Tallement (c. 1666–1707)

Paul Tallement (18 June 1642, in Paris – 30 July 1712, in Paris), known as Paul Tallemant le Jeune (the Younger), was a French churchman and scholar.

== Biography ==
Inspired by the then-fashionable style of sentimental cartography (as exemplified by the Carte de Tendre or Gulliver's Travels), in 1663 he published an imaginary allegorical travel-memoir Voyage de l'isle d'amour (Voyage to the isle of love), where the places are ruled by figures such as Respect, Concern, Pride, Warmth, Modesty and (in the second part) Coquetry and Gallantry. He also wrote divertissements, panegyrics and funeral elogies.

He was elected a member of the Académie française in 1666 and of the Académie des inscriptions et belles-lettres in 1673. Claude Gros de Boze said Tallement was "more to be recommended for his virtues than for his talents".

Paul Tallement was the cousin of François Tallemant l'Aîné and Gédéon Tallemant des Réaux.

== Works ==
- Voyage de l'isle d'amour (1663) (later translated into Russian by Vasily Trediakovski) Online text
- Le Second voyage de l'isle d'amour (1664)
- Recueil de quelques pièces nouvelles et galantes, tant en prose qu'en vers (1664)
- Panégyriques et harangues à la louange du roi, prononcés dans l'Académie française en diverses occasions (1677)
- Remarques et décisions de l'Académie françoise recueillies par M. L. Tallemant (1698). Réédition : Slatkine, Genève, 1972. Online text
