= George Wharton (died 1609) =

17th-century British politician

Sir George Wharton KB (1583 – 8 November 1609), of Wharton Hall, Westmorland, was a Member of Parliament for Westmorland in 1601.

Wharton was known for his disputes with other courtiers. In September 1608 he argued with the Earl of Pembroke over a game of cards. On the next day while hunting, Wharton hit Pembroke's page with a stick. Pembroke and Wharton argued over this insult. Later the same day Wharton rode towards Pembroke, and Pembroke hit him. The King intervened to prevent a duel.

On 8 November 1609, another argument over playing cards escalated between Wharton and Lord Blantyre's son Sir James Stewart, Master of Blantyre, and husband of Dorothy Hastings. They fought in a duel and killed each other in Islington and were buried in the same grave.

The Venetian ambassador Marc' Antonio Correr wrote that King James moved out of London in response to the duel, to avoid any bad feeling against his Scottish courtiers. He identified Wharton as a brother of the sister-in-law of Henry Wotton, the English ambassador in Venice. (Margaret Wharton was the wife of Edward Wotton, 1st Baron Wotton).
