= Bembo family =

Venetian noble family

- Coat of arms of the House of Bembo
- Current region: Italy
- Distinctions: Doge of Venice
- Estate: Palazzo Bembo

The Bembo family was a noble Venetian family, part of the Venetian noble families of most ancient origins (the Longhi).

== History ==
Although there is no precise information about the origin of the Bembo (there are only late traditions with no historical foundation), the "pseudo-Giustinian" Chronicle of the 1350s lists them in a group of twelve families located just below the duodecim nobiliorum proles Venetiarum. They were therefore one of the most important families already in ancient times, and maintained this prestige until the end of the Republic.

The first records date back to the 10th century when they appeared in the public life of the Duchy of Venice giving some maggiorenti (the so-called "judges"). However, it will be necessary to wait until the second half of the 13th century to see them fully active in public life.

== Notable members ==
- Marco Bembo (c.1230–1296), politician, diplomat and military man. He was at the head of the crusading squad gathered in Ancona by Giovanni Dandolo. While he was bailo of Constantinople, he was imprisoned and murdered by the Genoese after Ruggero Morosini attacked their colony of Pera.
- Francesco Bembo († post 1427), politician and military man. Captain of the general army in the Po in 1426, he was the architect of the memorable naval action of Cremona against Filippo Maria Visconti.
- Francesco Bembo († 1416), clergyman. He was primicerius of San Marco and in 1412 opened the process of canonization of Catherine of Siena, authorizing the preaching in honor of the saint.
- Beata Illuminata Bembo († 1493), abbess of the monastery of Corpus Domini in Bologna, wrote Specchio d'illuminazione, biography of Saint Catherine of Bologna, in which she described, among other things, the prodigious events she was present at during the exhumation of the saint.
- Bernardo Bembo (1433–1519), humanist and politician.
- Pietro Bembo (1470–1547), son of Bernardo, cardinal and famous scholar.
- Giovanni Bembo (1543–1618), doge of Venice from 1615 to his death.
- Dardi Bembo (?–?), politician and man of letters. Captain of Vicenza in 1580 and mayor of Treviso in 1589, he was known as a translator of Plato. For him Tiberio Tinelli painted a Presentazione e disputa al tempio and a triptych on canvas with the Birth of the Baptist, the Baptist in the Desert, and the Baptism of Christ (Nascita del Battista, il Battista nel Deserto, Battesimo di Cristo).
- Antonia Padoani Bembo (1640–1720), singer and composer at the court of Louis XIV.
- Giovanni Francesco Bembo (1659–1720), clergyman. He was bishop of Belluno from 1694 to his death.
- Pier Luigi Bembo Salamon (1823–1882), politician. He was senator of the Kingdom of Italy and mayor of Venice.
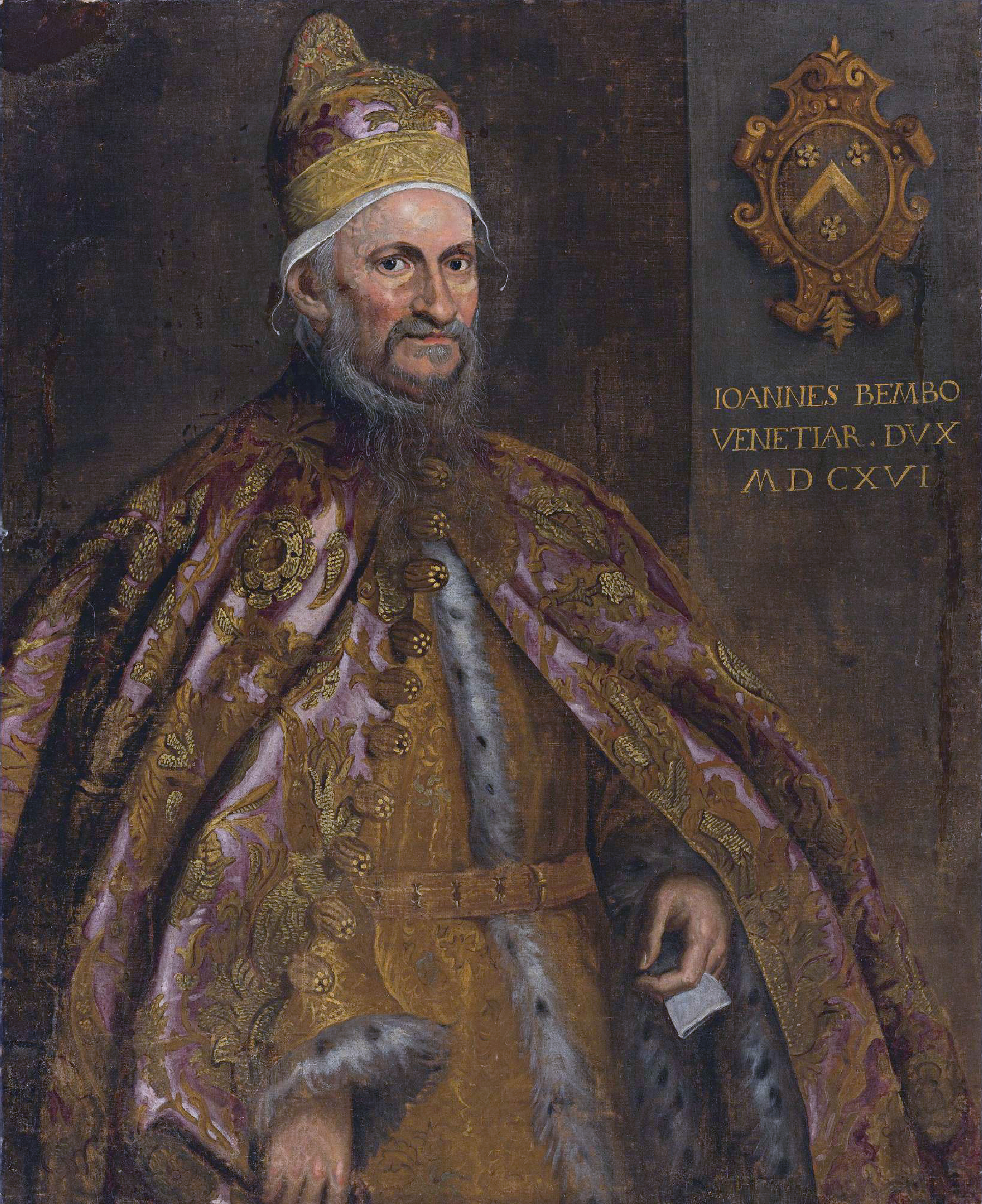
The doge Giovanni Bembo

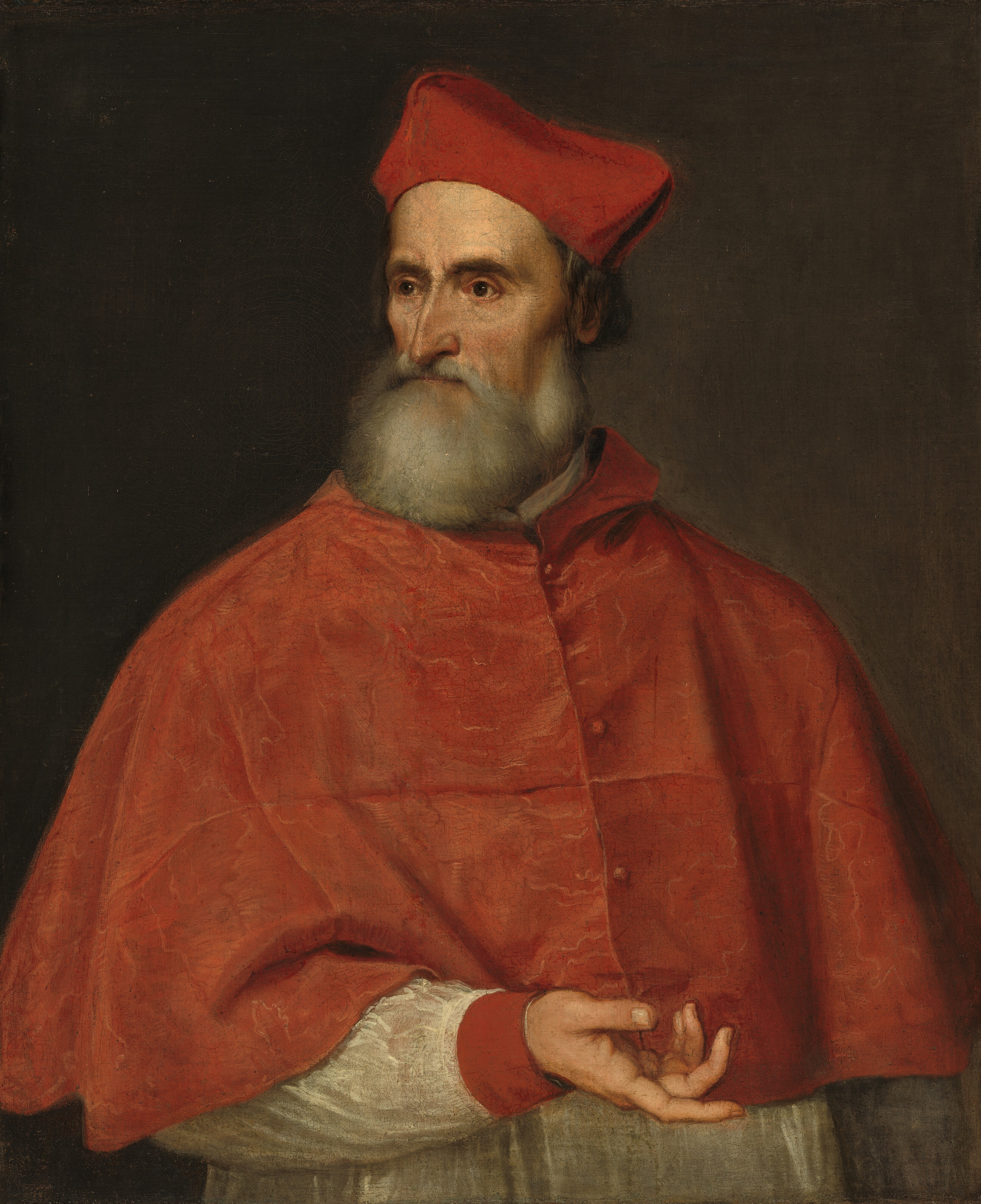
Cardinal Pietro Bembo

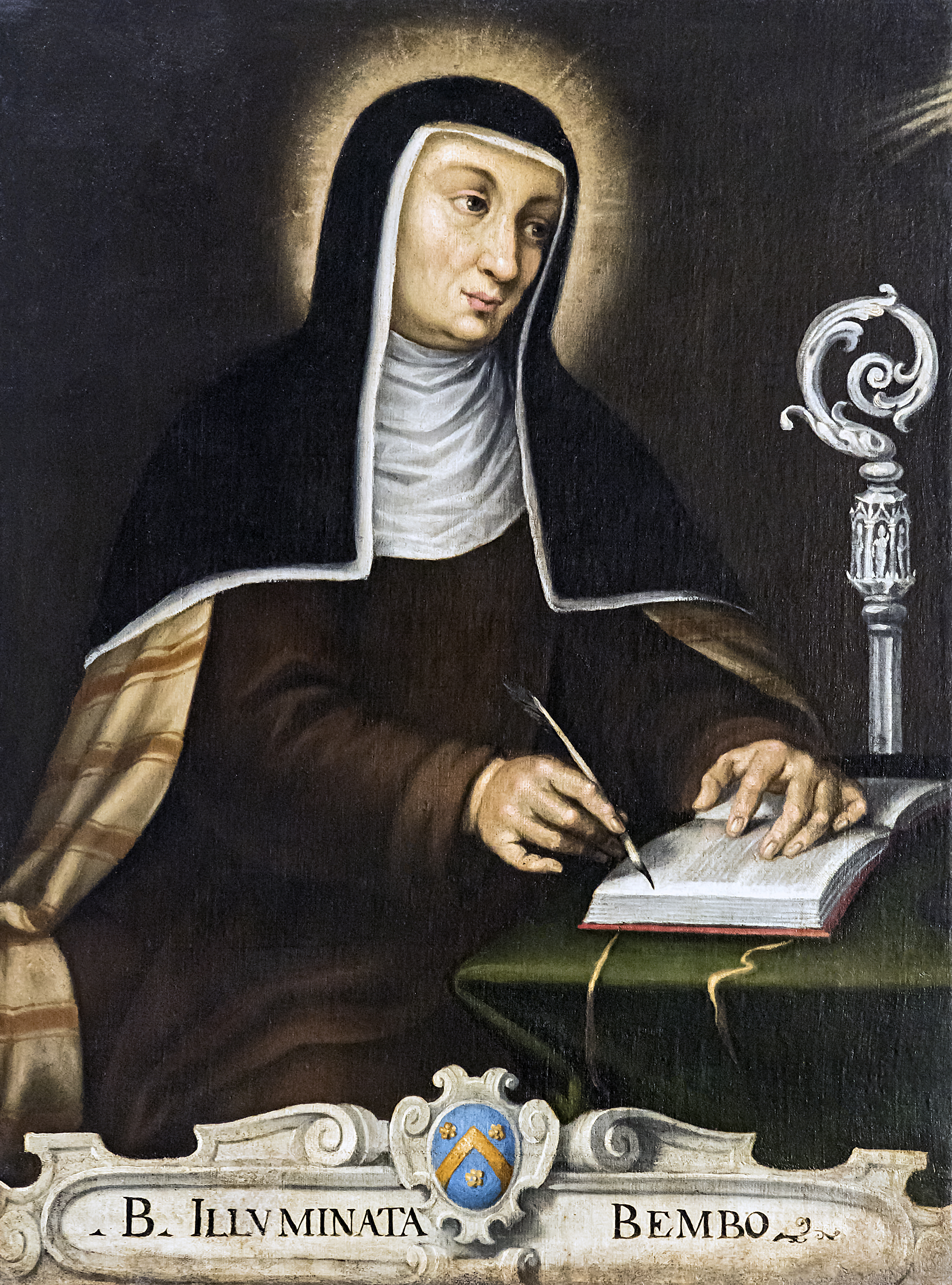
Blessed Illuminata Bembo

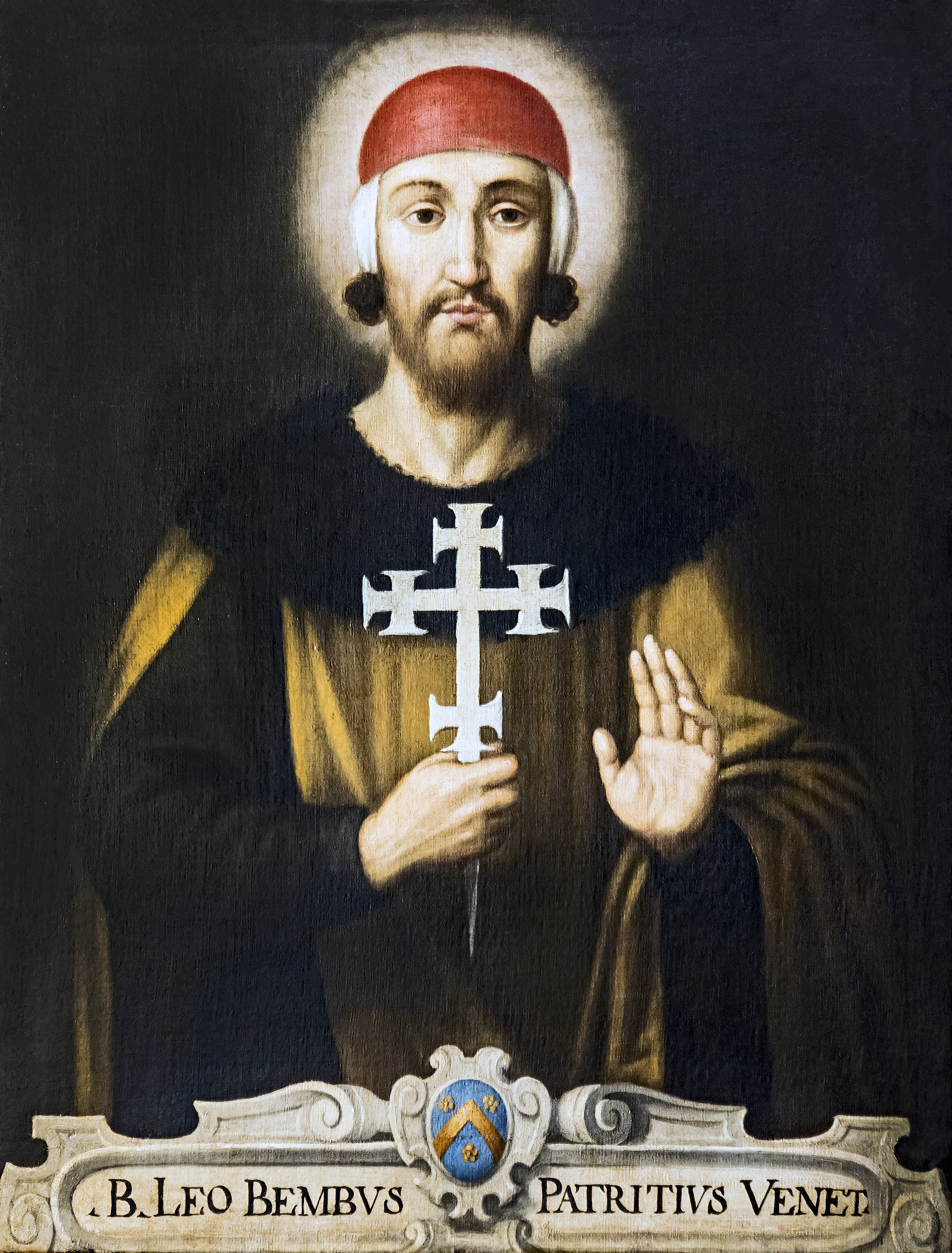
Blessed Leone Bembo

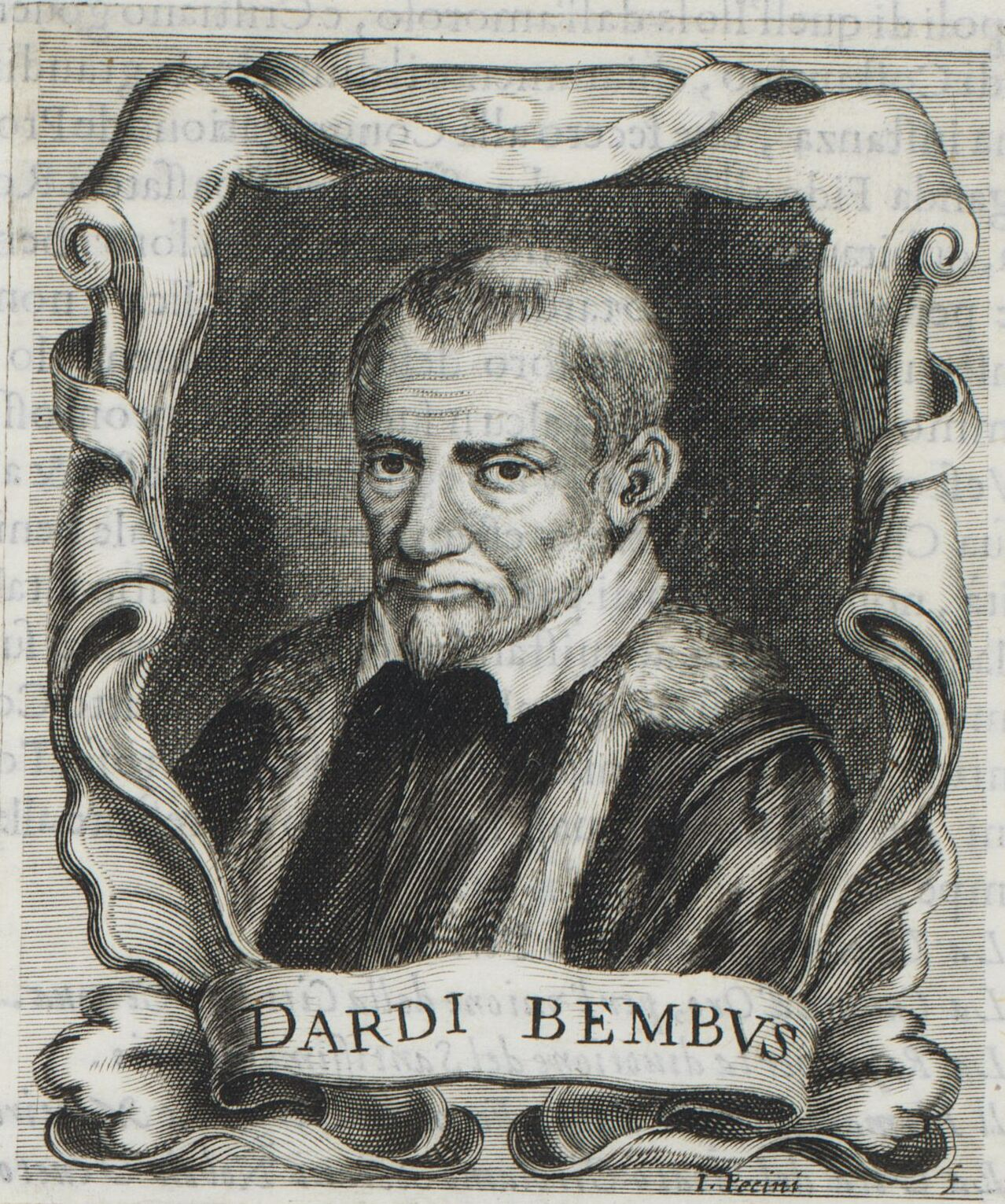
Dardi Bembo
