= Marc' Antonio Correr =

Venetian nobleman and ambassador

Marc' Antonio Correr (1570-1638) was a Venetian nobleman and ambassador at the Stuart court.

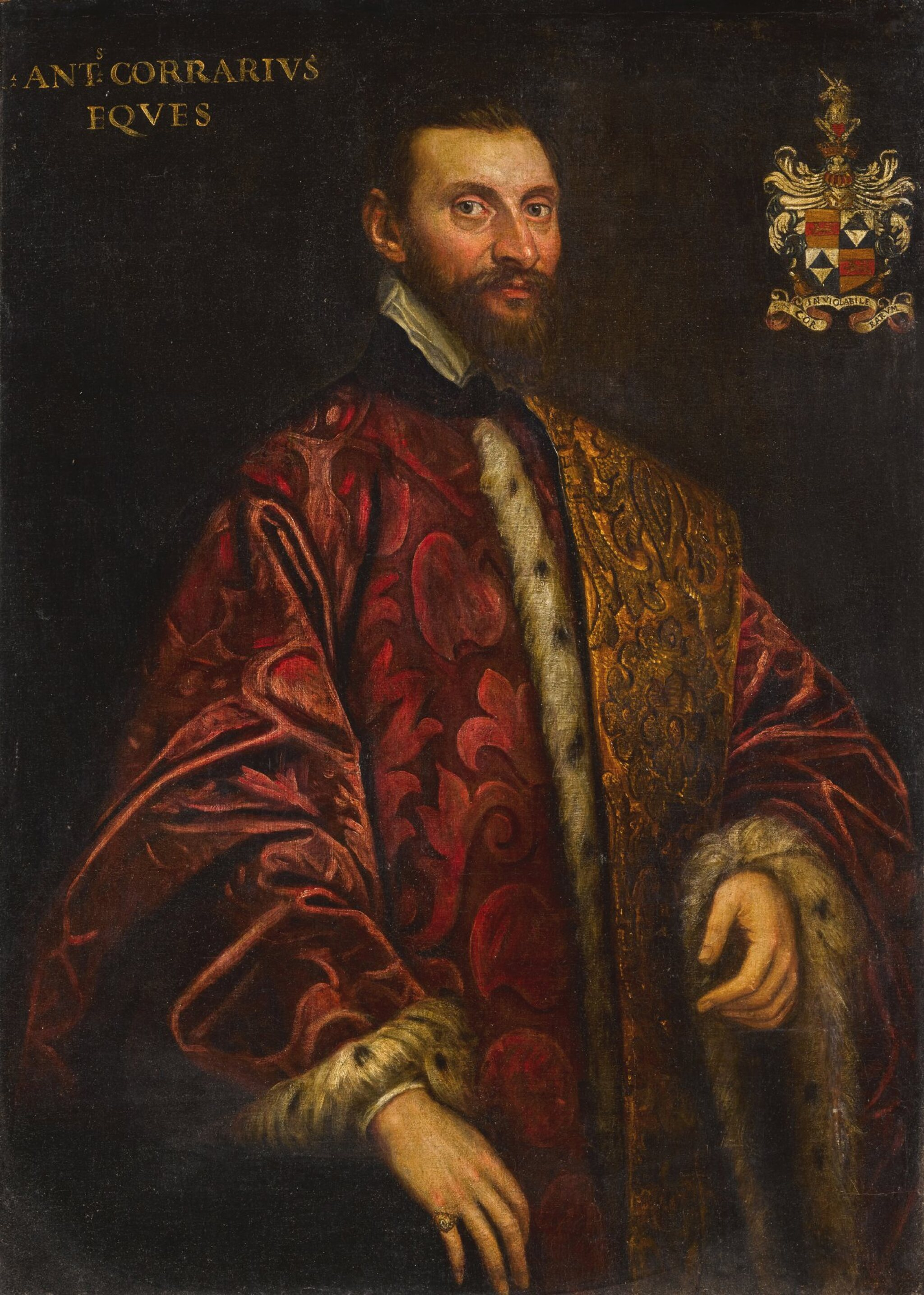
Portrait of a Venetian Senator, possibly Marc' Antonio Correr (by Domenico Robusti, called Domenico Tintoretto)

He was chosen to replace Zorzi Giustinian as ambassador in London in 1608. His letters give an insight into international politics and court life.

In March 1609 Marc' Antonio Correr heard that Henrietta Stewart, Countess of Huntly had written to Anne of Denmark to intercede with King James for her husband, George Gordon, 1st Marquess of Huntly, who was imprisoned in Scotland as a Catholic. King James replied to Henrietta that Anne of Denmark would not interfere with his royal orders.

In September 1609, Correr had an audience with King James at Wanstead after a day's hunting. Correr felt his news from Venice was urgent, concerning restrictions on the sale of An Apologie for the Oath of Allegiance, and asked the Duke of Lennox as chamberlain, to arrange an audience. The king was only half-dressed when Correr saw him. James joked about this interview in a letter to Robert Cecil describing Correr as a character from the commedia dell'arte, "I have been this night surprised by the Venetian Ambassador, who, for all my hunting, hath not spared to hunt me out here! To be short, his chief errand was to tell me of a great fray in Venice betwixt my Ambassador there and that State about a prohibition that the Inquisition of Venice has set forth against the publishing of my book ... I write this unto you now, that in case this Pantalone come unto you ye may give him the like deferring answer".

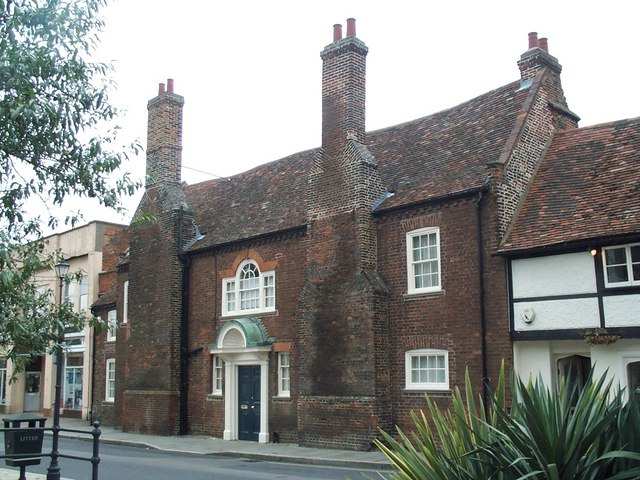
Marc' Antonio Correr conjectured that Royston Palace provided King James a safe haven from anti-Scottish feelings in London

In October 1609 plague reached Hampton Court with death of one of the grooms of the wardrobe, and another servant, and threatened King James at Royston. Another Venetian ambassador, Francesco Contarini set out to join Correr in England. Two pastry cooks died of plague at Hampton Court in November. There was a rumour that two of the ladies in waiting had converted to Catholicism. One was Arbella Stuart.

Marc' Antonio Correr reported the doubly fatal duel in November 1609 between James Stewart, husband of Dorothy Hastings, and George Wharton. He wrote that King James moved out of London back to Royston in response to the duel, to avoid any bad feeling against his Scottish courtiers. He identified Wharton as a brother of the sister-in-law of Henry Wotton, the English ambassador in Venice. (Margaret Wharton was the wife of Edward Wotton, 1st Baron Wotton).

Correr's son Vincenzo or Vicenzo came to England, and Henry Wotton wrote him a letter of personal recommendation to Prince Henry in Augusty 1608. Wotton noted that the Correr family were Venetian nobles, but not one of the 24 recognised "ancient houses".

In August 1610 Correr went to see Prince Henry at Richmond Palace and Prince Charles at Kew. They invited his son Vincenzo and his nephew Piero Loredan to go hunting with them. Correr indicated that King James was jealous of the popularity of Prince Henry, "the rising sun".

At the end of November 1610 he reported the death of one of Jean Drummond's maids from the plague in her lodgings at Greenwich Palace and Anne of Denmark returned to Whitehall for fear of infection. Correr noted that Anne of Denmark's masque Love Freed from Ignorance and Folly was twice postponed because of the delayed arrival of the French ambassador, the Marshal de Laverdin. Correr suggested the delay was also caused by problems with the stage machinery.

His replacement as ambassador, Antonio Foscarini, arrived in May. On his way to London he was met by Vincenzo Correr and Piero Loredan. Marc' Antonio Correr left England in June. King James knighted him at Greenwich and gave him 14 silver gilt cups and Anne of Denmark gave him a diamond ring with the royal portraits, and jewels and pearls for his wife, Elisabetta di Francesco Lippomano, and his son Vincenzo.
