= Marcantonio Memmo =

Doge of Venice from 1612 to 1615

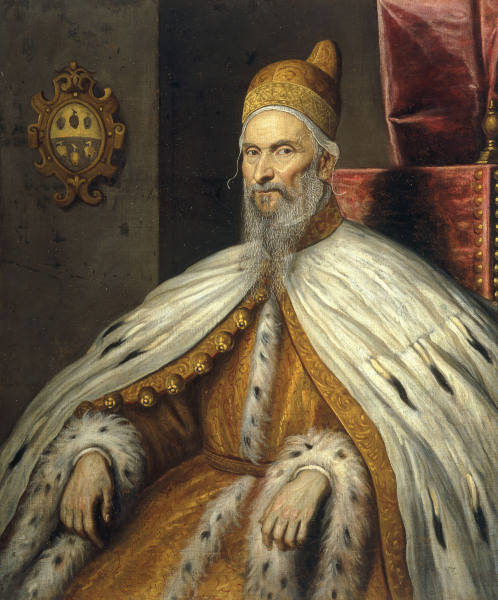
Portrait of Marcantonio Memmo by Leandro Bassano

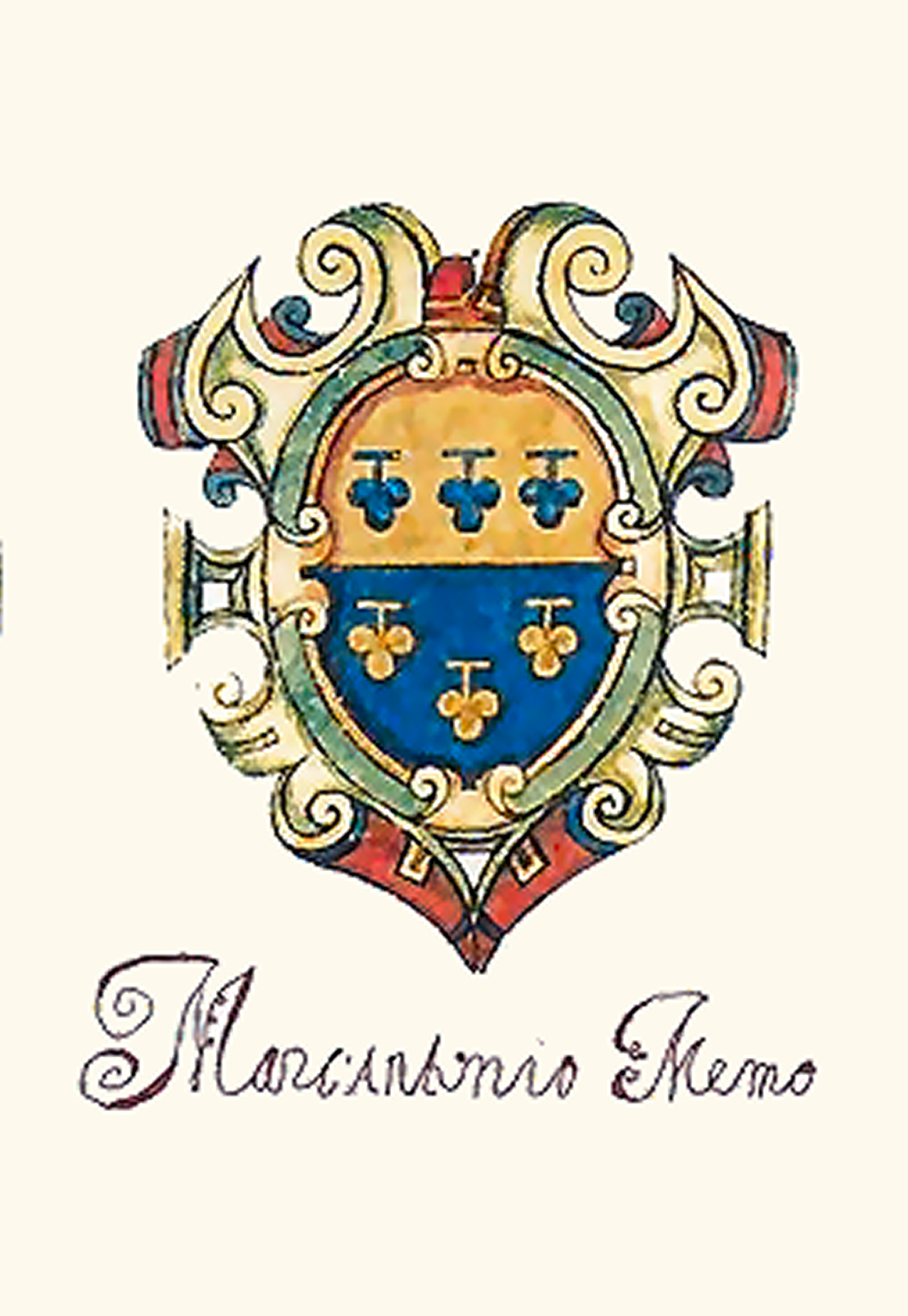
Arms of Marcantonio Memmo

The coat of arms of Doge Marcantonio Memmo - Formerly displayed at the main entrance of the Venice Arsenal.

Marcantonio Memmo (Venice, 11 November 1536 – 31 October 1615) was the 91st Doge of Venice, reigning from 24 July 1612 until his death.

== Background, 1536–1612 ==
The son of Giovanni Memmo and Bianca Sanudo, he was born into a family of average wealth. He went into business as a merchant and made a fortune through his careful management.

As a prominent Venetian, he traversed the Venetian cursus honorum, becoming in turn, provveditore, podestà, and Procurator of St Mark's. He was set to become doge in 1606, but was not helped by the fact that the Memmo were one of the "vecchie" ("old"), Venetian noble families and every doge from 1382 on had been a member of one of the "nuove" ("new") Venetian noble families. He was thus unable to win support for his election in 1606, and lost out to Leonardo Donato.

== Reign as Doge, 1612–1615 ==
Memmo used the years of Donato's reign to maneuver behind the scenes, swinging into high gear following Donato's death on 16 July 1612. When the election was held on 24 July 1612, Memmo was elected on the first ballot, with 38 of the 41 votes, a shock to the nuove faction that had dominated the position of Doge for centuries. Great festivals were organized to celebrate Memmo's victory, and, like previous Doges, he would use the celebrations that attended great holidays as a way to curry favor with the population of Venice.

Little of note happened in Memmo's reign as Doge, except for an incursion of Uskoci pirates in 1613. He died on 31 October 1615.

Political offices
| Preceded by Leonardo Donato | Doge of Venice; 1612–1615 | Succeeded by Giovanni Bembo |
