= Francesco Contarini =

Doge of Venice from 1623 to 1624

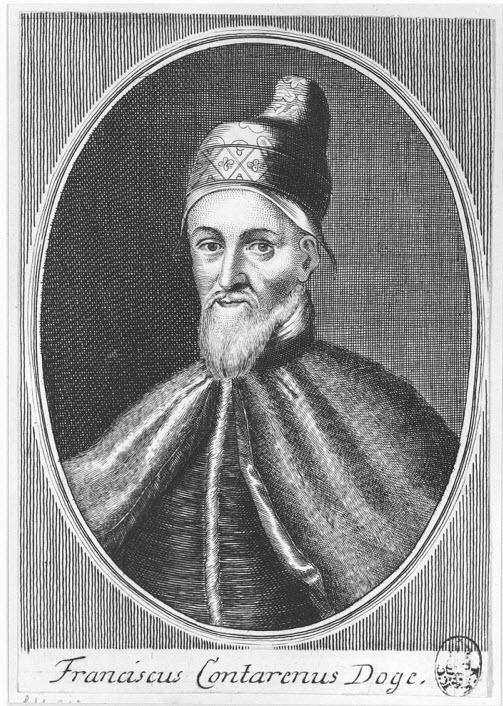
Francesco Contarini

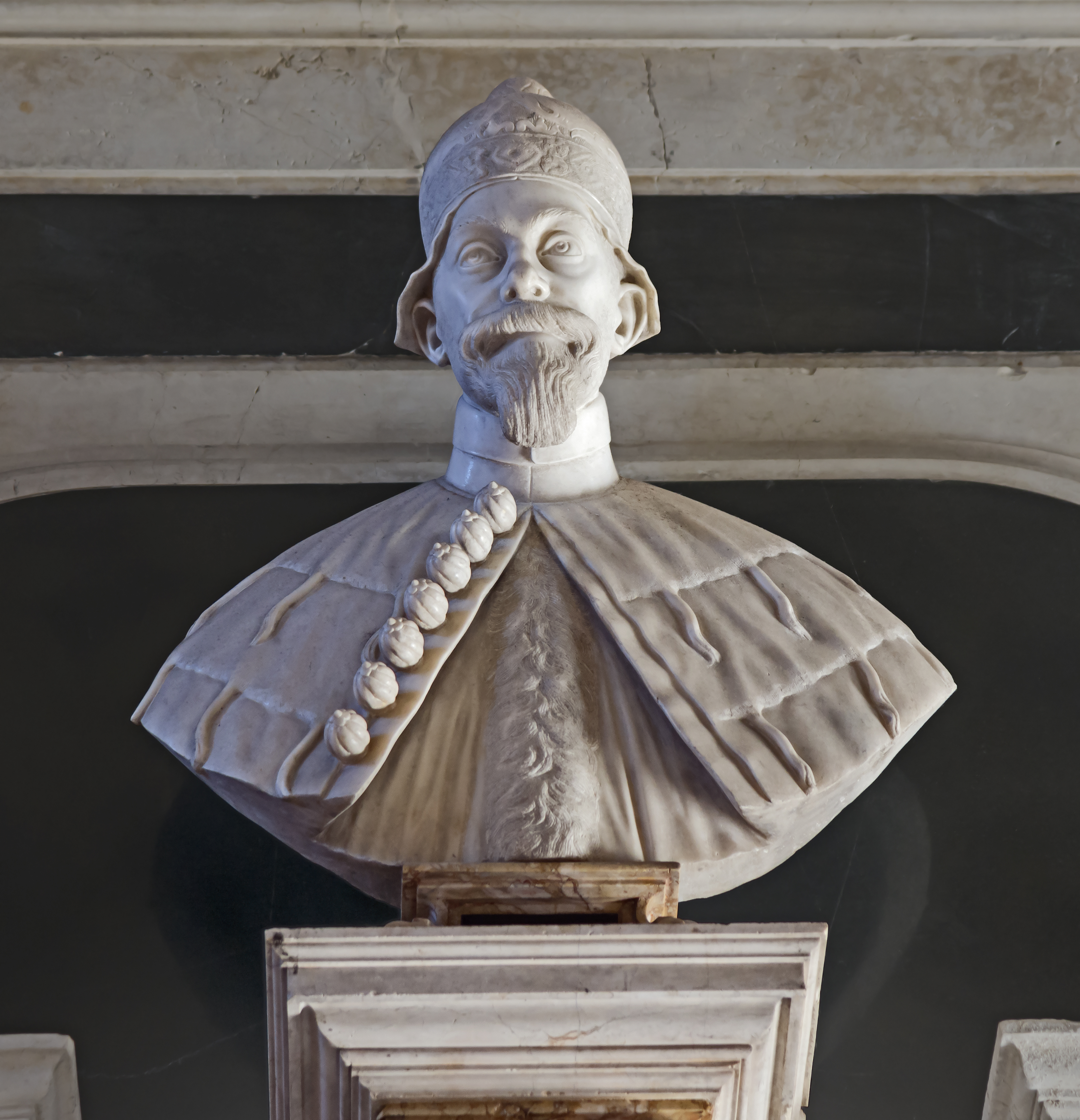
Francesco Contarini San Francesco della Vigna

Francesco Contarini (Venice, 28 November 1556 – Venice, 6 December 1624) was the 95th Doge of Venice, reigning from 8 September 1623 until his death fourteen months later. He was a member of the House of Contarini, one of the founding families of Venice.

== Background, 1556–1623 ==
Francesco Contarini was the son of Bertucci Contarini and Laura Dolfin. Both of his parents died while he was young, leaving him as an orphan who was raised by his two older brothers. The three brothers had inherited a substantial fortune, and no expense was spared on Francesco Contarini's education.

A lover of travel, Contarini was sent on several diplomatic missions, representing the Republic of Venice in many European courts. He was the bailo in Constantinople from 1602 to 1604. In 1611 Contarini was in England, serving as Venetian ambassador with Marc' Antonio Correr at the court of King James. A man of refined manners, he gained a reputation of always placing the needs of Venice above his own self-interest.

== Doge, 1623–1624 ==
Following the death of Antonio Priuli on 12 August 1623, there was no obvious successor as Doge. When voting commenced, there was a stalemate. Francesco Contarini did not particularly want to be Doge, but after 79 ballots had failed to elect a Doge, he was prevailed on to agree to become Doge, and he was elected on 8 September.

Little of note happened during Contarini's time as Doge. As was customary, he participated in the large Venetian festivals. The Thirty Years' War, which had spilled into the Valtellina in February 1623, went well for Venice, although Contarini did not himself participate in fighting.

Contarini was only 67 when elected as Doge, a relatively young age for a position frequently inhabited by octogenarians. Nevertheless, he became ill 12 months after he became Doge and died six weeks after that.

Political offices
Preceded by Antonio Priuli	Doge of Venice; 1623–1624	Succeeded by Giovanni I Cornaro
