= François Chauveau =

French artist (1613–1676)

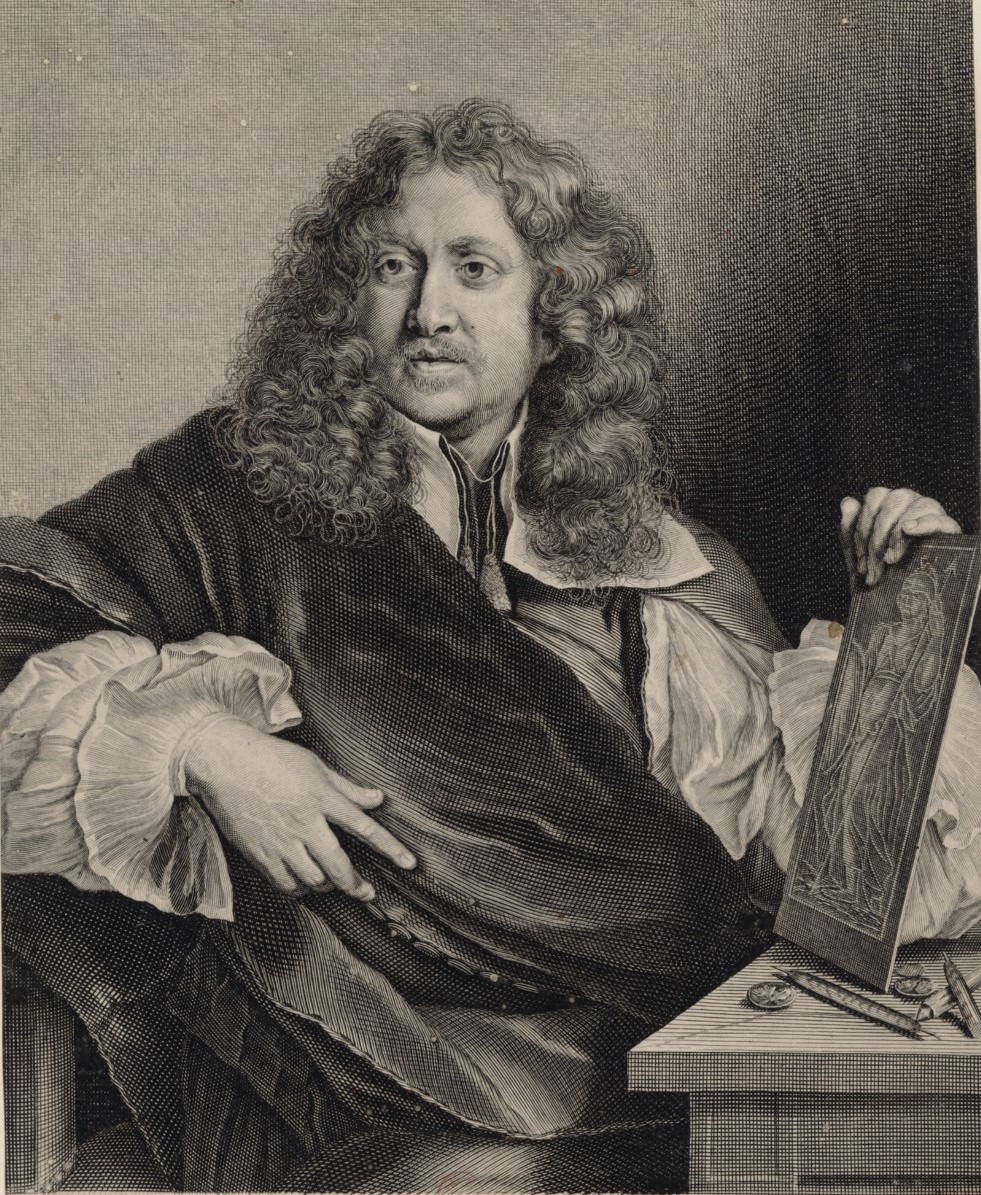
- Engraved portrait by Louis Cossin after Claude Lefèbvre, 1668.
- Born: 10 May 1613; Paris, Kingdom of France
- Died: 3 February 1676 (aged 62); Paris, Kingdom of France

François Chauveau (French pronunciation: [fʁɑ̃swa ʃovo]; 10 May 1613 – 3 February 1676) was a French artist, known as a burin engraver, draftsmen and painter.

== Biography ==
François Chauveau was born 10 May 1613 in Paris, as the second son of the impoverished noble, Lubin Chauveau and of Marguerite de Fleurs. He studied in the studio of Laurent de La Hyre and specialised in etching. He married Marguerite Roger on 8 February 1652.

Louis XIV gave him a pension and the title of Graveur du Roi (King's engraver) in 1662.

Chauveau was the first printmaker to be made a member to the Académie royale de peinture et de sculpture on 14 April 1663.

He died in 1676 in Paris.

Notable for his great culture and imagination, he was one of the four French engravers cited by Charles Perrault in his "Hommes illustres". Chauveau left nearly 1,600 works (frontispices, vignettes...), including illustrations for works by Mademoiselle de Scudéry (he engraved the famous Map of Tendre and the frontispiece for her Artamène), Scarron, Molière, Racine and Boileau. La Fontaine summoned him to illustrate the first six books of his fables.

He had many students, including Nicolas Guérard, Jean-Baptiste Broebes and Edward Davies. His children included René, Évrard and Louis Chauveau.

== Gallery ==
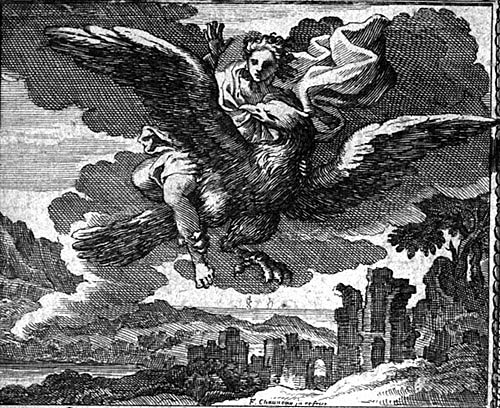
Enlevement de Ganymède

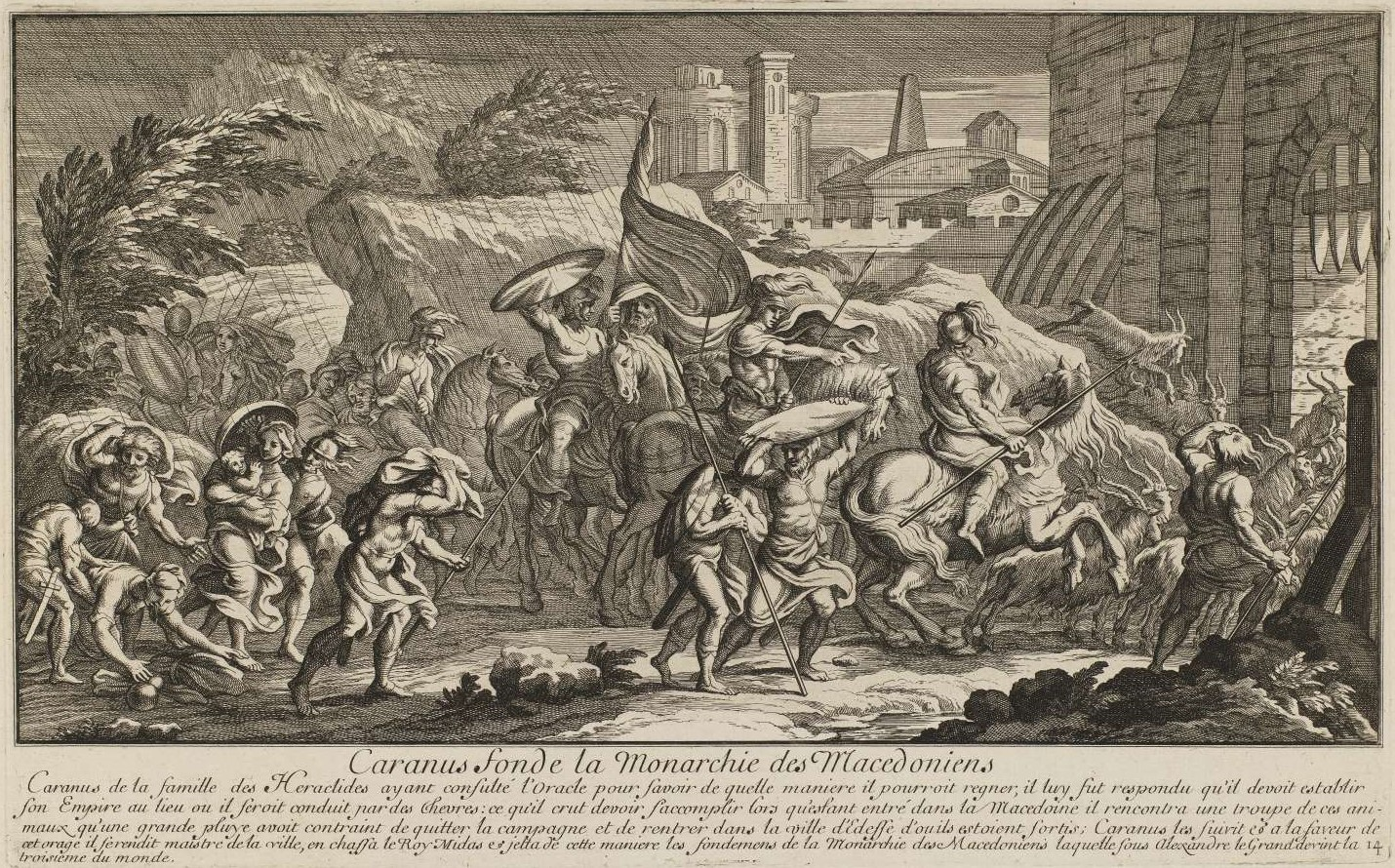
Caranus fonde la monarchie des Macédoniens
