= Antonio Priuli (doge) =

Doge of Venice from 1618 to 1623

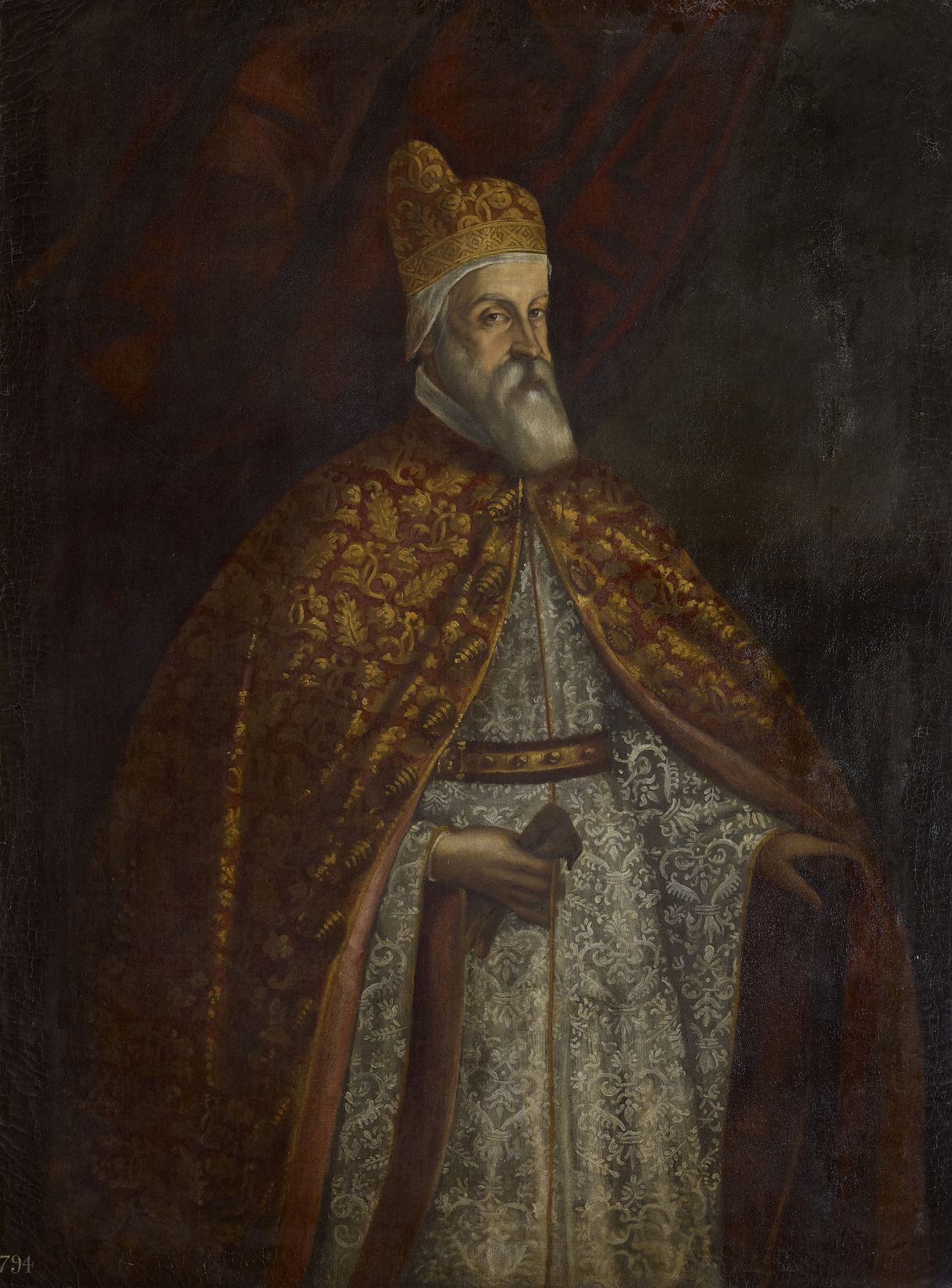
Portrait attributed to Odoardo Fialetti, c. 1600–1625

Antonio Priuli (10 May 1548 – 12 August 1623) was the 94th Doge of Venice from 1618 until his death in 1623. Priuli became Doge in the midst of a supposed Spanish conspiracy orchestrated by the Spanish Ambassador to Venice, Alfonso de la Cueva, 1st Marquis of Bedmar. The associated intense espionage did not end until 1622.

== Background, 1548–1618 ==
Priuli was born and died in Venice. He was the son of Gerolamo Priuli and Elisabetta Cappello. He enjoyed a successful career as a sailor and a soldier. He married Elena Barbarigo and the couple had 14 children, which resulted in the need for Priuli to become heavily indebted.

In 1618, he was appointed provveditore of Veglia. Upon the sudden death of Doge Nicolò Donato only 35 days after his election, Priuli was recalled from Veglia to become Doge.

== Doge, 1618–1623 ==
Priuli was hurriedly elected as Doge on 17 May 1618, only days after the death of Donato. His election coincided with the Bedmar Conspiracy allegations, and the start of a brutal process of ferreting out suspected plotting against the Venetian state. Hundreds were arrested, with or without cause, with attention specially focused on foreign soldiers and sailors. The manhunt led to the arrest of many actual plotters, but also of many innocent victims, such as Antonio Foscarini, a patrician who was executed on 21 April 1622, after attending an event at the English embassy.

The crackdown ended in 1622, and on 16 January 1623 the Venetian government issued an apology to Alethea Talbot for Foscarini's execution. Venice and Spain continued to be at odds throughout the seventeenth century.

In February 1623 the Thirty Years War spilled into Venetian territory, though only in the Valtellina. Priuli was, however, already too ill to participate, and died not long thereafter, on 12 August 1623.

Political offices
Preceded by Nicolò Donato	Doge of Venice; 1618–1623	Succeeded by Francesco Contarini
