= Giovanni Bembo =

Doge of Venice from 1615 to 1618

- 92nd Doge of Venice
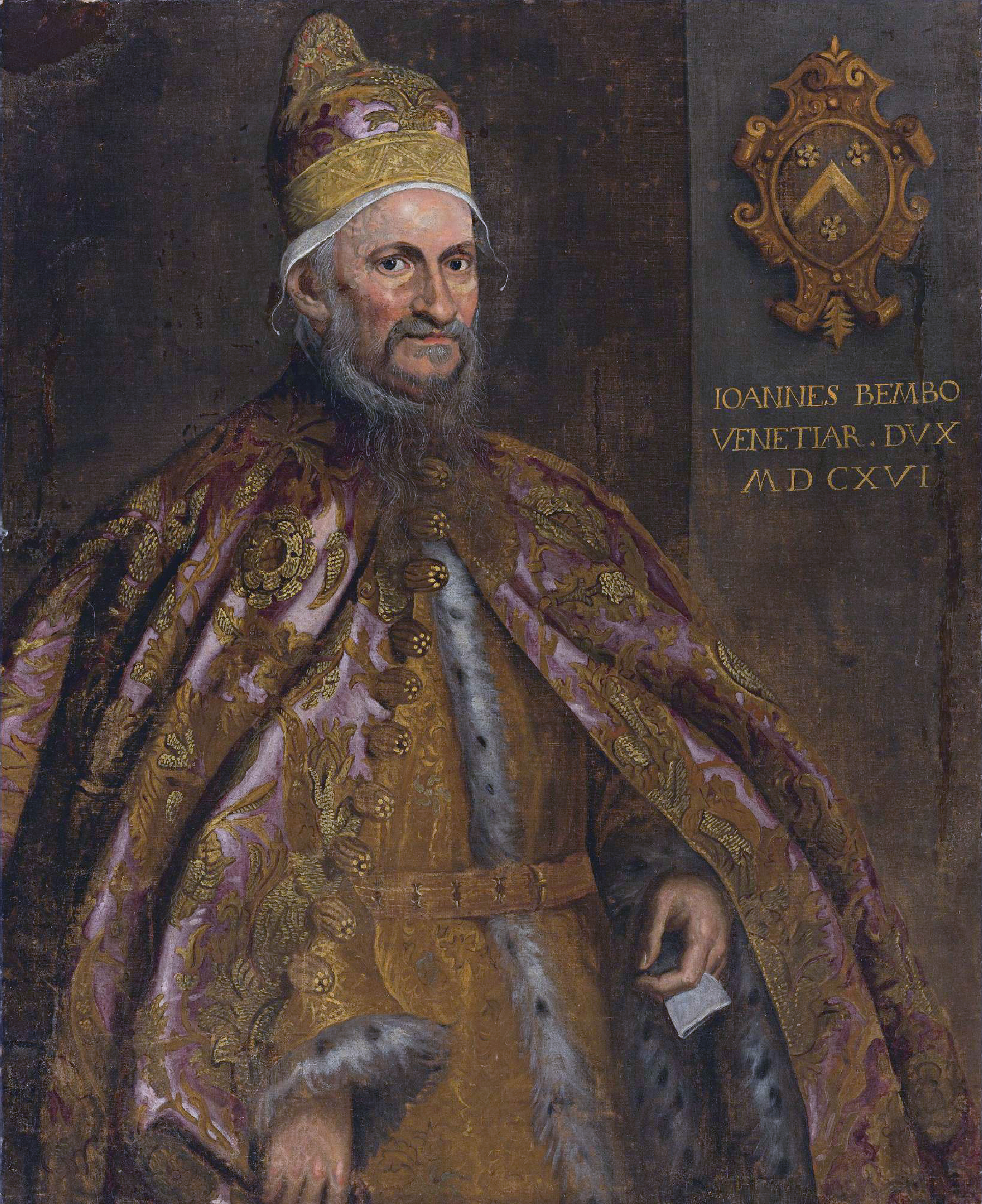
- Portrait of Bembo by Tintoretto (1616)
- Reign: 2 December 1615 – 16 March 1618
- Predecessor: Marcantonio Memmo
- Born: August 21, 1543; Venice
- Died: March 16, 1618 (aged 74); Venice
- House: Bembo family
- Father: Augustine Bembo
- Mother: Chiara Del Basso

Giovanni Bembo (21 August 1543 – 16 March 1618) was the 92nd Doge of Venice, reigning from his election on 2 December 1615 until his death. His reign is notable for Venetian victories during the War of Gradisca (1617) and for the Bedmar Plot (1618), in which the Spanish ambassador to Venice, Alfonso de la Cueva, 1st Marquis of Bedmar, was unsuccessful in his plans to destabilize the Most Serene Republic.

== Background, 1543–1615 ==
Giovanni was born in Venice, the son of Augustine Bembo and Chiara Del Basso. The Bembos were one of the vecchie, old Venetian noble families. Giovanni Bembo's mother left him with a large inheritance, which he divided with one brother.

Bembo enrolled as a crew of a galley at age 12, and he remained aboard ship for sixteen years. He fought in the Battle of Lepanto (1571), showing great courage in spite of being wounded repeatedly.

Following his good showing in the Battle of Lepanto, Bembo was appointed captain at Candia and provveditore at Corfu and Friuli. He served with distinction and went on to become savio grande, ducal councillor, and subsequently Procurator of St Mark's and Captain General of the Sea in 1607.

== Reign as Doge of Venice, 1615–1618 ==
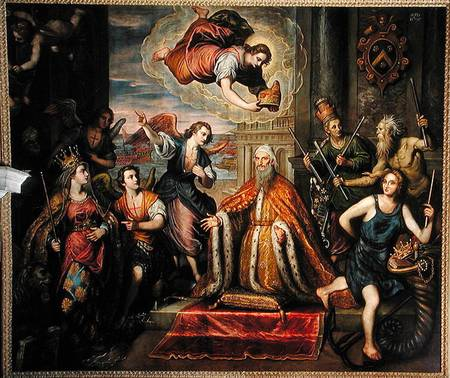
Painting by Domenico Tintoretto depicting Giovanni Bembo kneeling before the personification of the Republic of Venice.

Doge Marcantonio Memmo died on 31 October 1615, leaving no obvious choice for a successor. In the ensuing dogal election the old noble families (the vecchie faction) were divided between two candidates, while the new noble families (the nuove faction) were unable to unite behind a candidate at all. The 41 electors passed through several rounds of voting without reaching a decision, leading to rioting in Venice. Eventually, on 2 December 1615 a compromise was concluded and Bembo, a moderate member of the vecchie faction, was elected as Doge. As always, sumptuous feasts were held to celebrate the occasion.

For a number of years, Venice had been harassed by Uskoci pirates, encouraged by Ferdinand, Archduke of Inner Austria, who offered the Uskoci his protection. Bembo's first act as Doge was therefore to declare war on Austria, launching the War of Gradisca (known in German as the Friulian War). This war saw the destruction of the Uskoci. The war took place –in Friuli, Gradisca d'Isonzo, Gorizia, and Istria. Venice had the upper hand militarily, with troops under Francesco Erizzo besieging Gradisca d'Isonzo successfully until the arrival of troops commanded by Albrecht von Wallenstein arrived, at which point Venice sued for peace, and a peace treaty was signed in Paris on 27 September 1617.

1617–18 saw Alfonso de la Cueva, 1st Marquis of Bedmar, the Spanish Ambassador to Venice, attempt to sow discord among mercenaries. The allegations about the supposed Bedmar Conspiracy were made after Bembo's death on 16 March 1618, in Venice.

Political offices
Preceded by Marcantonio Memmo	Doge of Venice; 1615–1618	Succeeded by Nicolò Donato
