= Évrard Chauveau =

French painter

Évrard Chauveau (1660–1739) was a French painter, the son of François Chauveau.

He was born in Paris in 1660, and studied under his father and Henri Lefebvre. He was largely employed at Gaillon by Archbishop Colbert, and in 1695 went to Sweden, where he painted many ceilings and decorations for the palaces of the Queen and nobles. He died in Paris in 1739.
