= Leonardo Donato =

Doge of Venice from 1606 to 1612

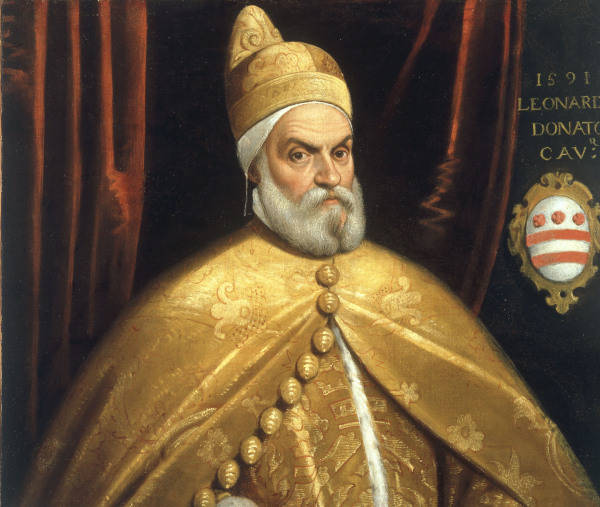
Leonardo Donato

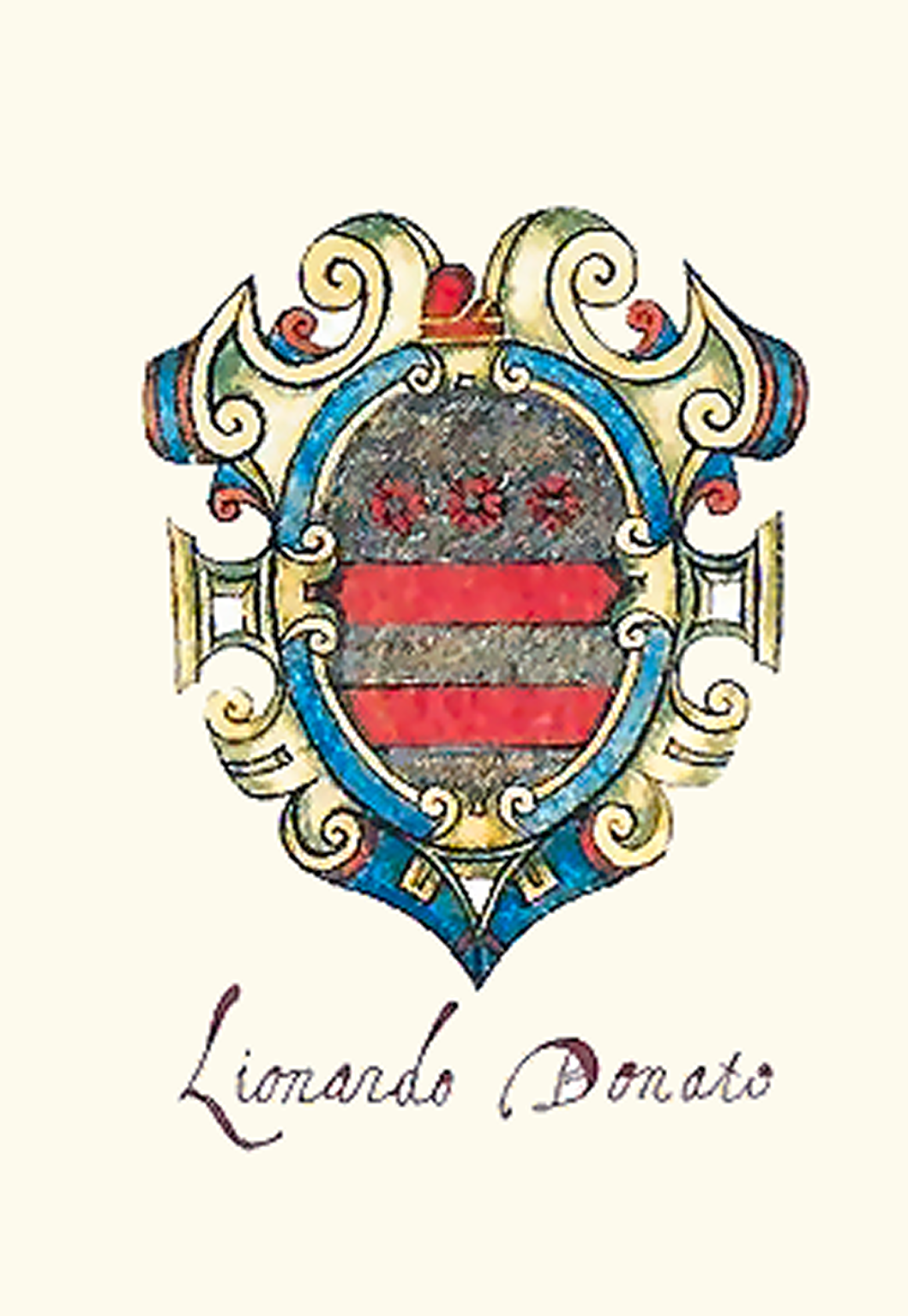
Coat of arms of Leonardo Donato

Leonardo Donà, or Donato (Venice, 12 February 1536 – Venice, 16 July 1612) was the 90th Doge of Venice from his election on 10 January 1606 to his death in 1612. His reign is chiefly remembered for Venice's dispute with the papacy, which resulted in Pope Paul V placing a papal interdict on Venice 1606–1607.

== Background, 1536–1606 ==
The son of Giovanni Battista Donato and Giovanna Corner, Donato was born into a merchant family. Through his shrewd business sense, he was able to turn his family's average amount of wealth into a fortune.

His wealth established, Donato began a public career in Venice, serving in turn as the Venetian ambassador to Constantinople, podestà of Venice, and as governor and Procurator of St Mark's.

Donato later served as the Venetian ambassador to the Vatican and lived at Rome for many years. His opposition to the ambitions of the papacy led him to conflict with Cardinal Borghese, the future Pope Paul V. Donato's staunchly anti-papal stance led to rumours that he was secretly a Protestant, although historians have not found any evidence of this.

== Reign as Doge, 1606–1612 ==
Donato became one of the candidates for Doge upon the death of Marino Grimani on 25 December 1605. Donato faced two opponents in this election (including Marcantonio Memmo, who would eventually succeed him as Doge), but ultimately received both of their support, resulting in his election as Doge on 10 January 1606.

Donato inherited a conflict with the papacy from Grimani: Between 1601 and 1604, Venice, under Grimani's leadership, had passed a number of laws limiting the power of the papacy within the Republic of Venice and withdrawing a number of clerical privileges. This came to a head in late 1605 when Venice charged two priests as common criminals, thus denying their clerical immunity from facing charges in secular courts. On 10 December 1605, two weeks before Grimani's death, Pope Paul V sent a formal protest to Venice.

Shortly after his election as Doge, Donato, at the urging of Paolo Sarpi, rejected Paul V's protest. As a result, in April 1606, Paul V issued a papal interdict on Venice, thus excommunicating the entire Venetian population. At Sarpi's urging, Donato ordered all Roman Catholic clergy to ignore the Pope's interdict and continue to perform the mass, on pain of immediate expulsion from the Venetian Republic. The Venetian clergy all continued to perform mass, except for the Jesuits, who left the Republic (or were expelled depending on one's perspective) rather than violate the papal interdict. The Jesuits would not return to Venice until 1655. Donato and Sarpi were also personally excommunicated by Paul V.

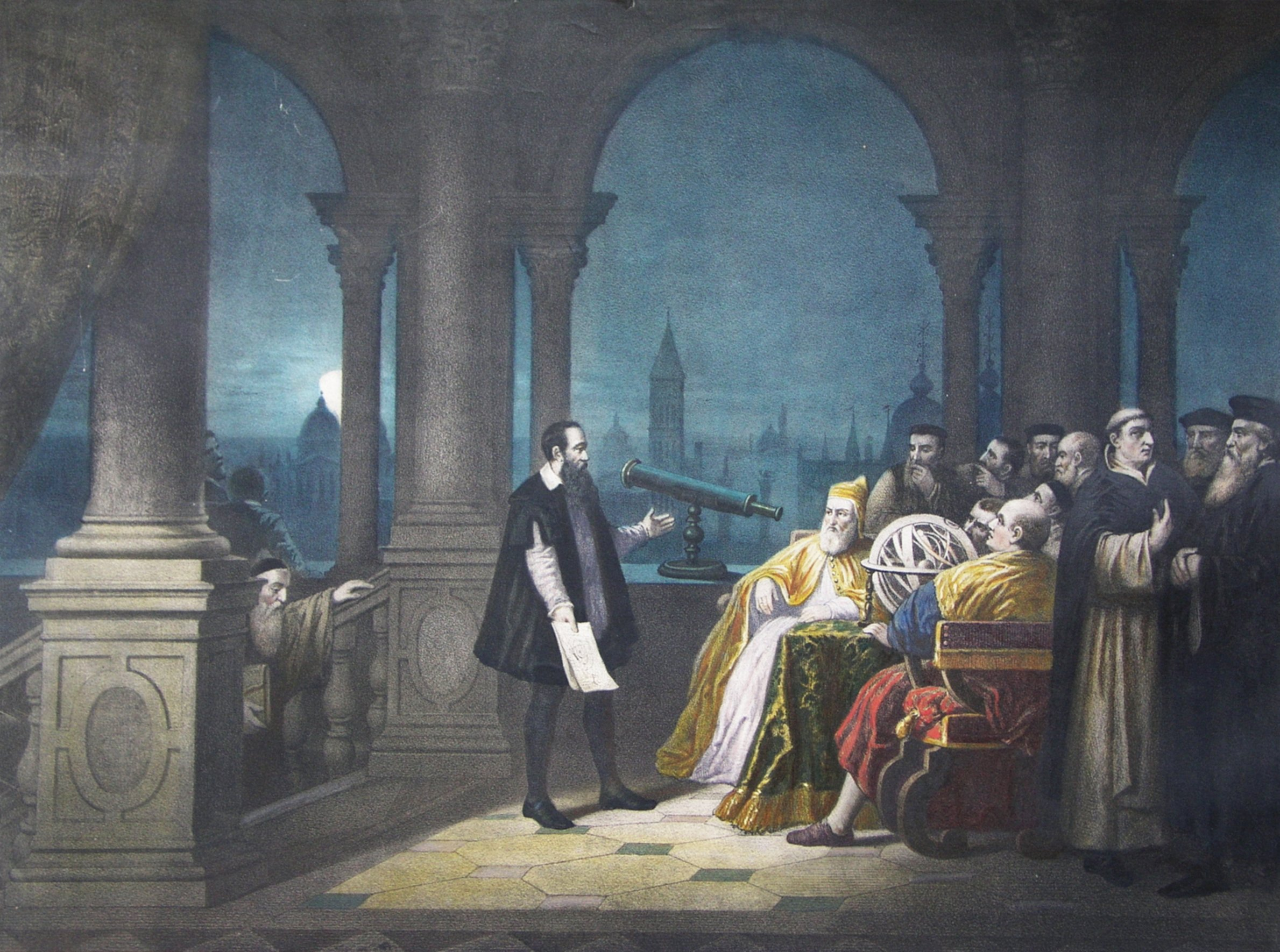
19th-century painting depicting Galileo Galilei displaying his telescope to Leonardo Donato in 1609.

The Kingdom of France acted as a mediator in the dispute between Venice and the papacy. On 21 April 1607 a deal was reached under which the two priests that Venice had charged as common criminals would be handed over to French custody, and, in exchange, the pope would remove the interdict against Venice.

The remainder of Donato's reign as Doge is largely without note. Donato was not at all popular with the Venetian crowd, so, after his first year as Doge, Donato significantly restricted his public appearances as Doge. Many rumours circulated about the reclusive Donato during these years, but none were ever substantiated. He died on 16 July 1612.

Political offices
Preceded by Marino Grimani	Doge of Venice; 1606–1612	Succeeded by Marcantonio Memmo
