= Giovan Battista Nani =

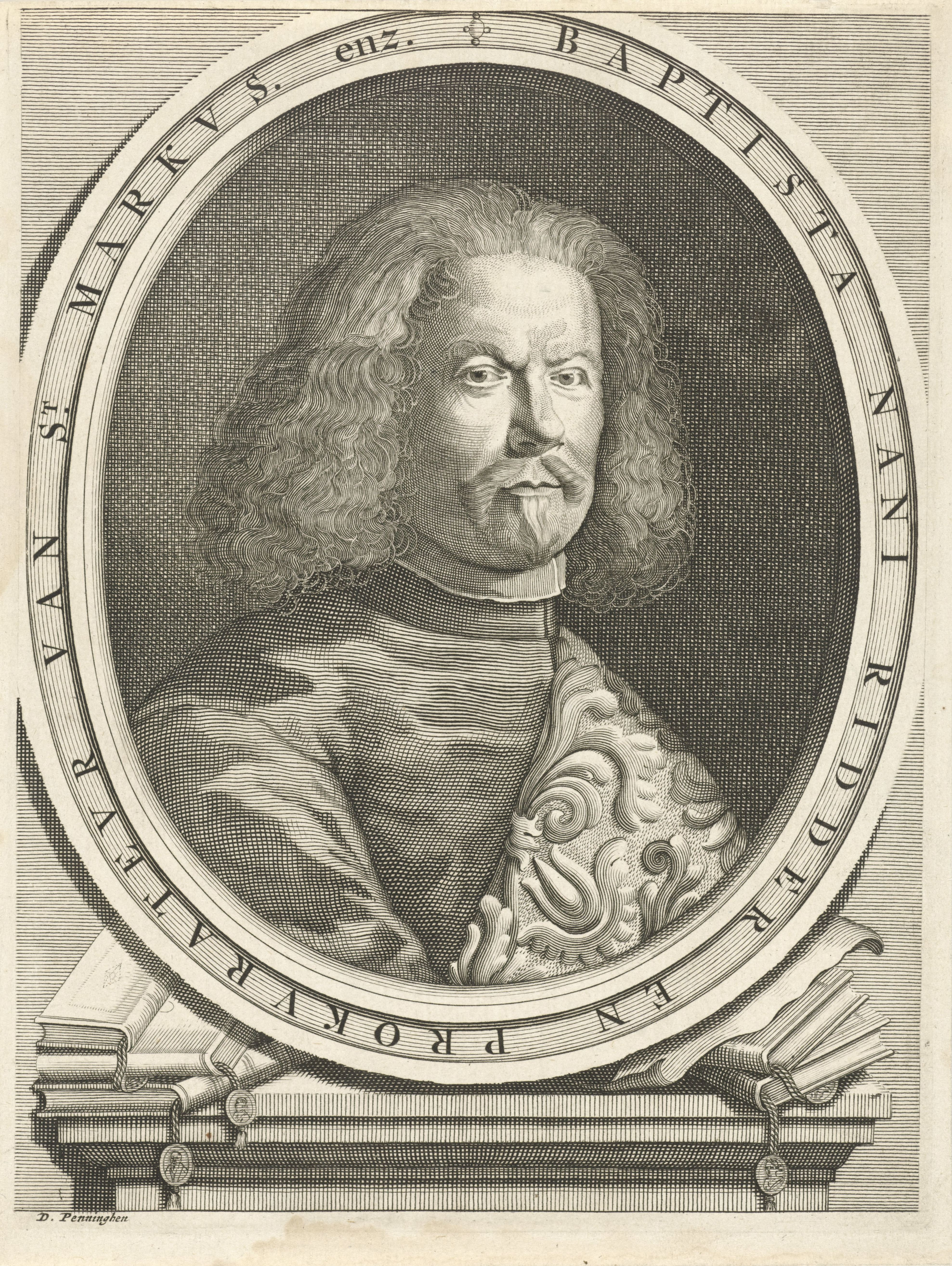
- Born: 30 August 1616; Venice, Republic of Venice
- Died: 5 November 1678; Venice, Republic of Venice
- Resting place: San Giovanni Nuovo
- Occupations: Diplomat, historian

Giovan Battista Nani (30 August 1616, Venice – 5 November 1678, Venice), in French Jean Baptiste Felix Gaspard Nani, was a Venetian ambassador, librarian, archivist, amateur botanist and historian, born into a patrician family. For 25 years (1643–68) Battista was the Republic of Venice's ambassador to France.

== Biography ==
Giovan Battista Nani was born in 1616 into a noble Venetian family. His father was procurator of Saint Mark, and ambassador from Venice to Rome. He was educated under the eye of his father, who took his son with him to Rome in his embassy from the Venetian Republic to Pope Urban VIII. In 1641, Nani was admitted into the College of Senators, and soon after was appointed ambassador to France, where he resided five years. He was much esteemed by Cardinal Mazarin, who often consulted him on public affairs. In 1648, he returned to Venice, after having obtained from the court of France a considerable aid of men and money for the defence of Candia against the Ottoman Empire. The superintendence of the affairs of war and the finances was then entrusted to him; and in 1664, he was sent ambassador to the Holy Roman Empire, which he again visited on the accession of the Emperor Leopold. In 1670, he went upon a second embassy to the court of France. At his return he was nominated procurator of Saint Mark; and was soon after raised to the post of Captain General of the Sea. A maritime life, however, not agreeing with him, he continued to serve the state at home. He died in Venice in 1678.

== Works ==
On 17 March 1652, Nani was appointed by the Senate to write the history of the Republic. He wrote in Italian the History of Venice from 1613 to 1671. Nani's History was translated into French by François Tallemant (1679) and Masclary (1702), and continued by Michele Foscarini and Piero Garzoni. In writing his history of Venice he has given a general history of his times, especially with respect to the affairs of the French in Italy. This history was printed in Venice, in 2 vols. 4to, in 1662 and 1679.

Nani wrote about the alleged Bedmar Conspiracy against Venice. The story was used by César Vichard de Saint-Réal in his Conjuration des Espagnols contre la République de Venise en l'année M. DC. XVIII, and in 1682 by Thomas Otway in playwright Venice Preserv'd, or A Plot Discover'd. Leopold von Ranke published his view on the conspiracy in Über die Verschwörung gegen Venedig, im Jahre 1618 (1831).

Nani left in manuscript a paraphrase on Lucan's Pharsalia, and Considerations on the Annals of Tacitus.

== Works ==
- Nani, Giovan Battista (1720). Istoria della repubblica veneta (in Italian). Vol. 1. Domenico Lovisa.
- Nani, Giovan Battista (1720). Istoria della repubblica veneta (in Italian). Vol. 2. Domenico Lovisa.

== Sources ==
- A'Beckett, William (1836). "Nani (Giambatista)". A Universal Biography. Vol. 3. London: Isaac, Tuckey, and Company.
