= Pax Hispanica =

Historical period

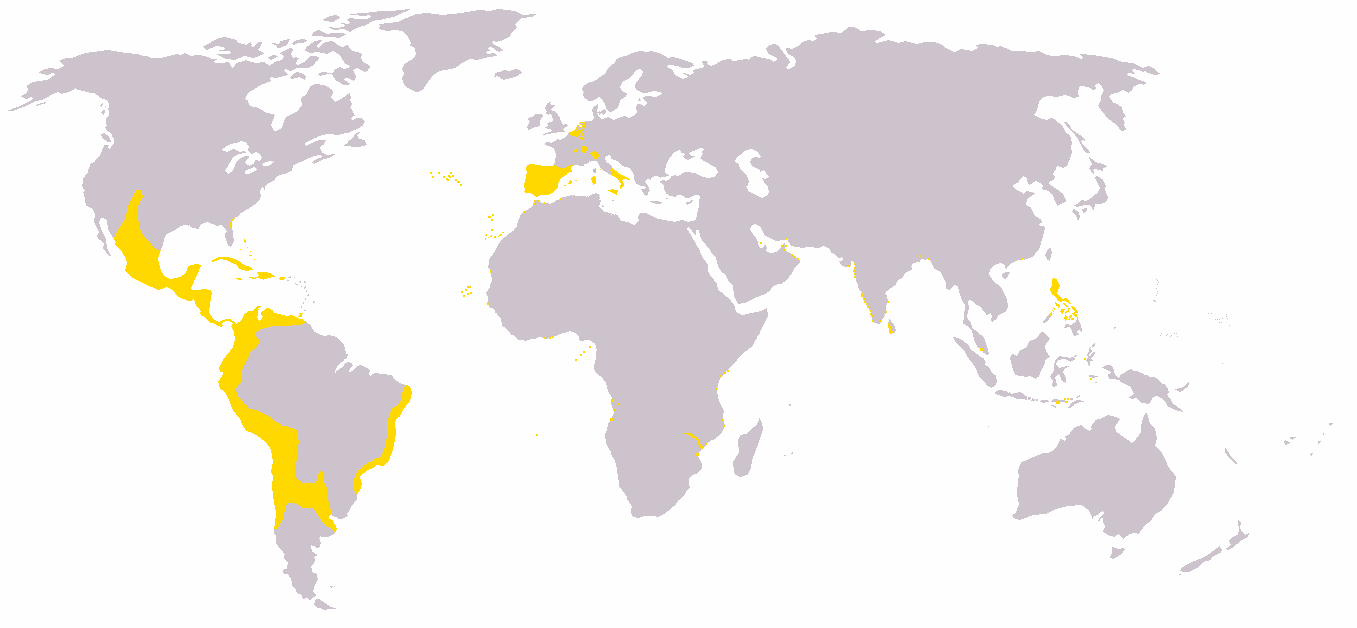
The Spanish Empire in 1598

The Pax Hispanica (Latin for "Spanish Peace") refers to a period of twenty-three years from 1598 to 1621, when Spain disengaged from the European wars of religion that characterised the previous century. Peace was signed with the Kingdom of France, the Kingdom of England, and the Dutch United Provinces. This roughly corresponds to the rule of Philip III of Spain.

Peace was achieved by several treaties:

- 1598: The Peace of Vervins ended Spanish involvement in the French Wars of Religion. Spain had been at war with France, with only brief respites, since the Second Italian War of 1499.
- 1604: The Treaty of London concluded the Anglo-Spanish War on terms largely favourable to Spain.
- 1609: The Twelve Years' Truce halted the fighting in the Spanish Netherlands.
- 1610: Henry IV of France was assassinated.

The Pax Hispanica (1598–1621) comprises the two peaceful decades of the Spanish Golden Age (1492–1661), a distinct and broader concept marked by wars of conquest in the Americas and the involvement in several European conflicts. The Spanish Golden Age began as Spain established its empire under Isabella I and Ferdinand II and continued with the Habsburg monarchs Charles I, Philip II, Philip III, and Philip IV. Under the Habsburgs, the use of force as part of Spanish colonial policies in the Americas was reviewed following the Valladolid Debate, but Spain became more and more involved in the European wars of religion.

Under Philip II, Spain was the foremost great power and had become involved in conflicts with the Dutch, the English, and the French. In 1579, the Dutch founded the Utrecht Union after the reconquest by Spain of many territories in the Dutch provinces by Alexander Farnese.

The following year, the Spanish Monarchy achieved, for the first time since the Muslim conquest, the territorial unity of the Iberian Peninsula through a personal union with the Kingdom of Portugal, thus creating the Iberian Union (1580–1640). After capturing Ostend from Spinola, the Dutch continued their rebellion, finally achieving independence during the reign of Philip III of Spain.

After this, Spain held the peace in Europe for nine more years, when the Twelve Years' Truce ended. The peace ended during the Thirty Years' War as Ferdinand II, Holy Roman Emperor called on his nephew, Philip IV of Spain, for assistance.
