= François Tallemant the Elder =

French churchman and translator

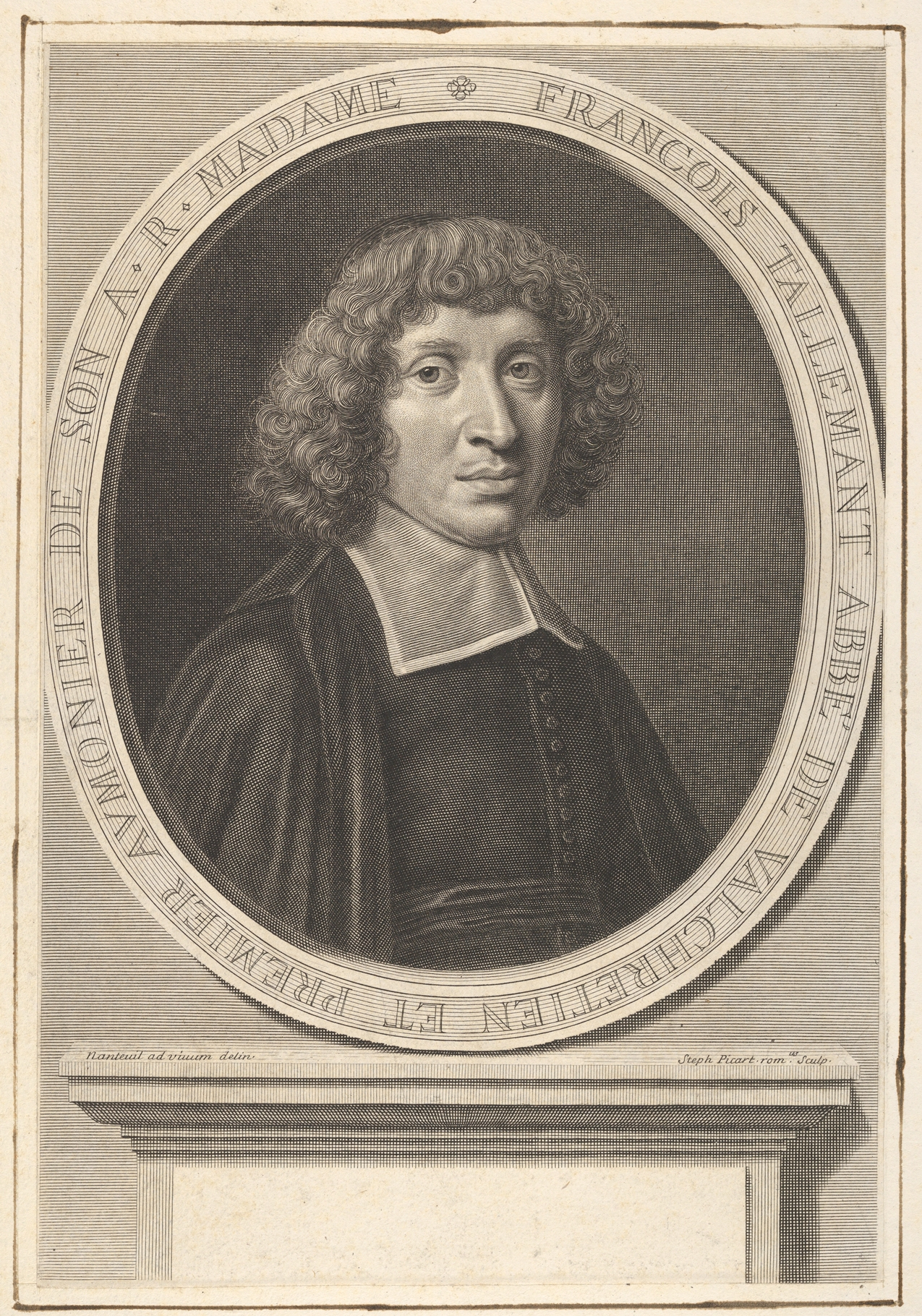
François Tallemant MET DP832667.jpg

François Tallement (1620, La Rochelle – 6 May 1693, Paris) was a French churchman and translator. He is often known as l'Aîné (the Elder) to distinguish him from his cousin Paul Tallement le Jeune.

== Biography ==
The brother of Gédéon Tallemant des Réaux, he was almoner to King Louis XIV for 24 years, then first almoner to Madame. He was elected a member of the Académie française in 1651. Paul Pellisson said of him "He had a mind, he did not even miss knowing.", whilst one historian in the Académie stated:

"He knew [ancient] Greek, Latin, Italian, English and Spanish perfectly. He was an excellent man, but by character a worrier. This fault made him the butt of a pleasant nickname: whilst some of our brothers of the Académie were cardinals, ministers and bishops and [thus] were called His Eminence, His Excellency, His Greatness, we called [Tallement] His Worriedness (Son Inquiétude).

== Works ==
We have two translations by him (adjudged mediocre by his contemporaries):

- Vies des hommes illustres from Plutarch, in six volumes (1663–65)
- Histoire de Venise by Giovan Battista Nani, in 4 volumes (1689)

His other works are six discourses he made in the Académie. In one of these he declares:

How sweet it is to mix with the elite of the best minds in the world! How useful it is to profit from study and from the application of the most skilled in all kinds of literature! After all, Gentlemen, one can only excel in one thing. Poetry alone, you know, divided herself between several different people, but the society of an academy makes useful to each [member] all the diverse talents of those of whom it is composed, by those knowledgeable and ingenious conversations in which each brings his particular fount [of knowledge] and speaks according to the genius that nature has given him and which he has cultivated by study.
