= Palazzo Bembo =

Palace in Venice

Coordinates: 45°26′13″N 12°20′06″E

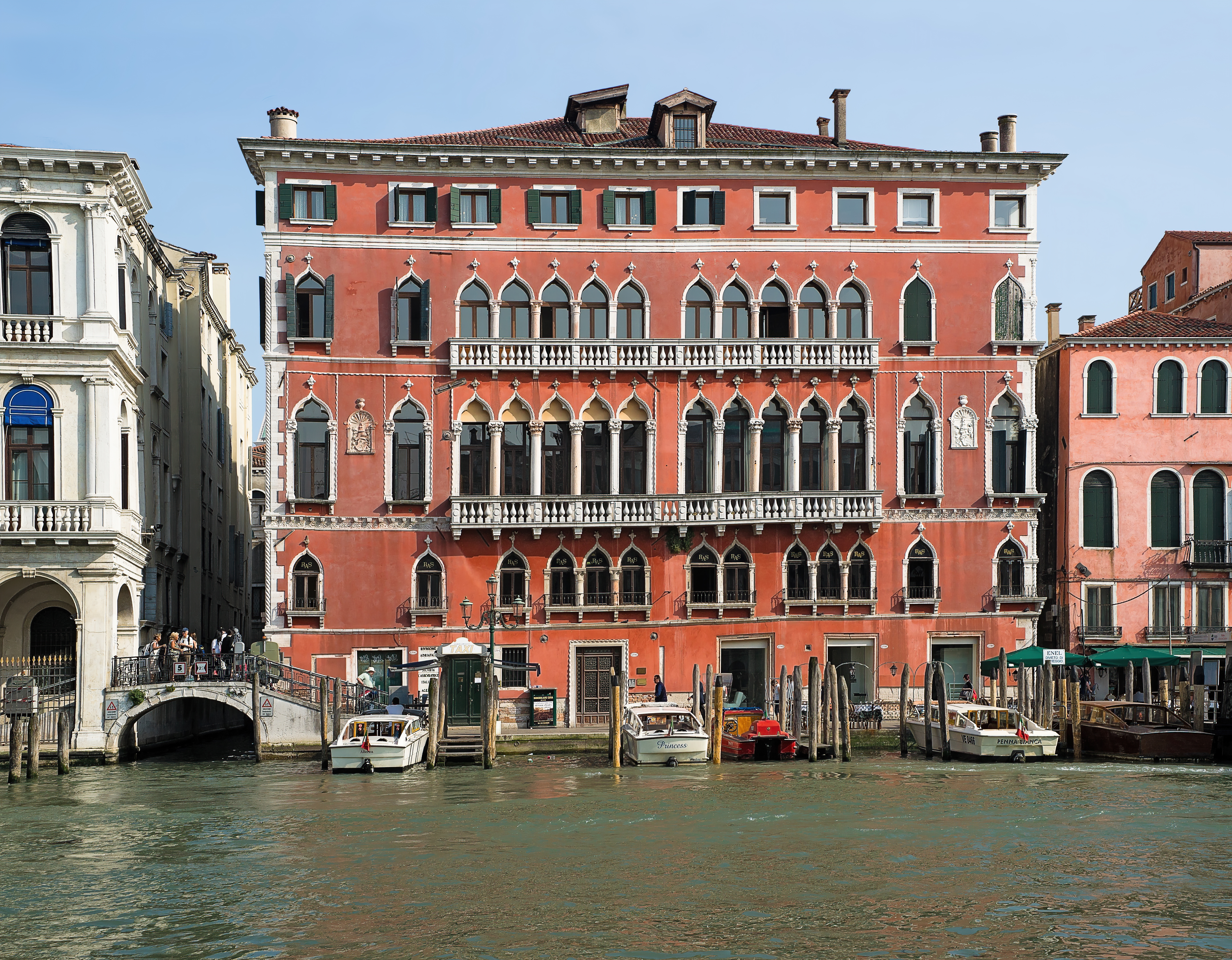
Palazzo Bembo.

Palazzo Bembo is a XIV century Venetian Gothic-Byzantine style palace in Venice, Italy, on the Grand Canal, close by the Rialto Bridge and next to the Palazzo Dolfin Manin.

== History ==
It was built by the noble family of Bembo at the end of 1300s. Although it was remodeled several times over the centuries, externally it still maintains the original structure. The building is on the San Marco side of the Grand Canal, wedged in between Rio di San Salvador and Calle Bembo.

Palazzo Bembo is the birthplace of Pietro Bembo (1470–1547), a Venetian scholar, poet, literary theorist, and cardinal. He was an influential figure in the development of the Italian language, specifically Tuscan, as a literary medium. His writings assisted in the 16th century revival of interest in the works of Petrarch. Bembo's ideas were also decisive in the formation of the most important secular musical form of the 16th century, the madrigal.

Today the building hosts a hotel on the top floor and a contemporary art exhibition venue.

== Description ==
The Palazzo's red façade is decorated with poliforas and combines old Venetian elements with influences from Byzantine architecture. The facade is considered to be an example of the Venetian Gothic-Byzantine style, a style of architecture originated in 14th-century Venice with the confluence of Byzantine styles from Constantinople, Arab influences from Moorish Spain, and early Gothic forms from mainland Italy. Palazzo Bembo's 17th century restoration took on influences from that period, as exhibited in its polychromy, three-part façade, and loggias.

== Modern Day Use ==
With the thriving of Venice Biennale in the city, Palazzo Bembo is currently known for its Venice Biennale art exhibitions organized by Personal Structures, an international contemporary art platform.
