= Map of Tendre =

French literary salon device (1654)

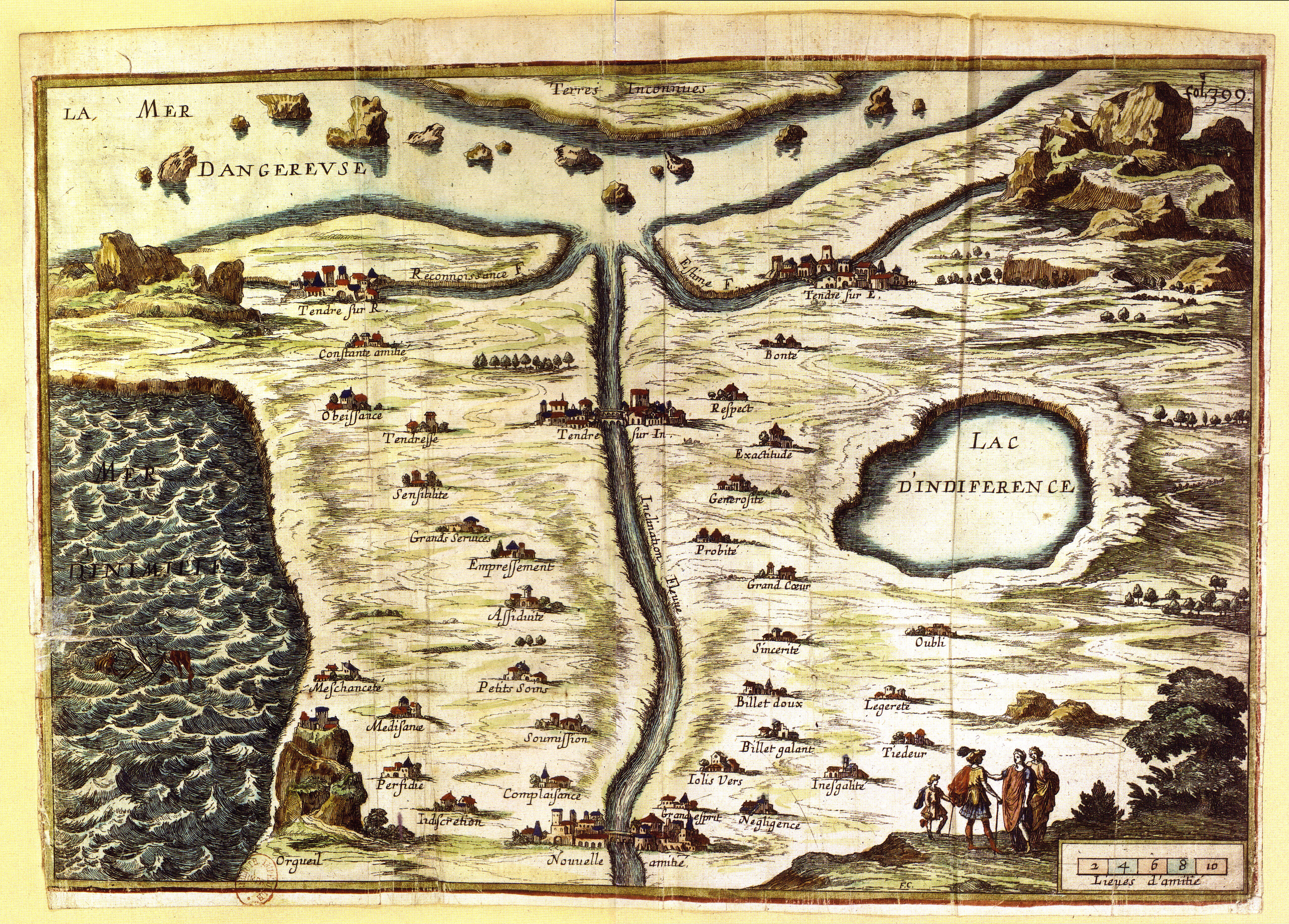
The Carte de Tendre or Carte du Pays de Tendre

The Map of Tendre (Carte de Tendre or Carte du Tendre) was a French map of an imaginary land called Tendre produced by several hands (including Catherine de Rambouillet). It appeared as an engraving (attributed to François Chauveau) in the first part of Madeleine de Scudéry's 1654-61 novel Clélie. The map represents the path towards love according to the précieuses of the time period.

== Allegorical geography ==
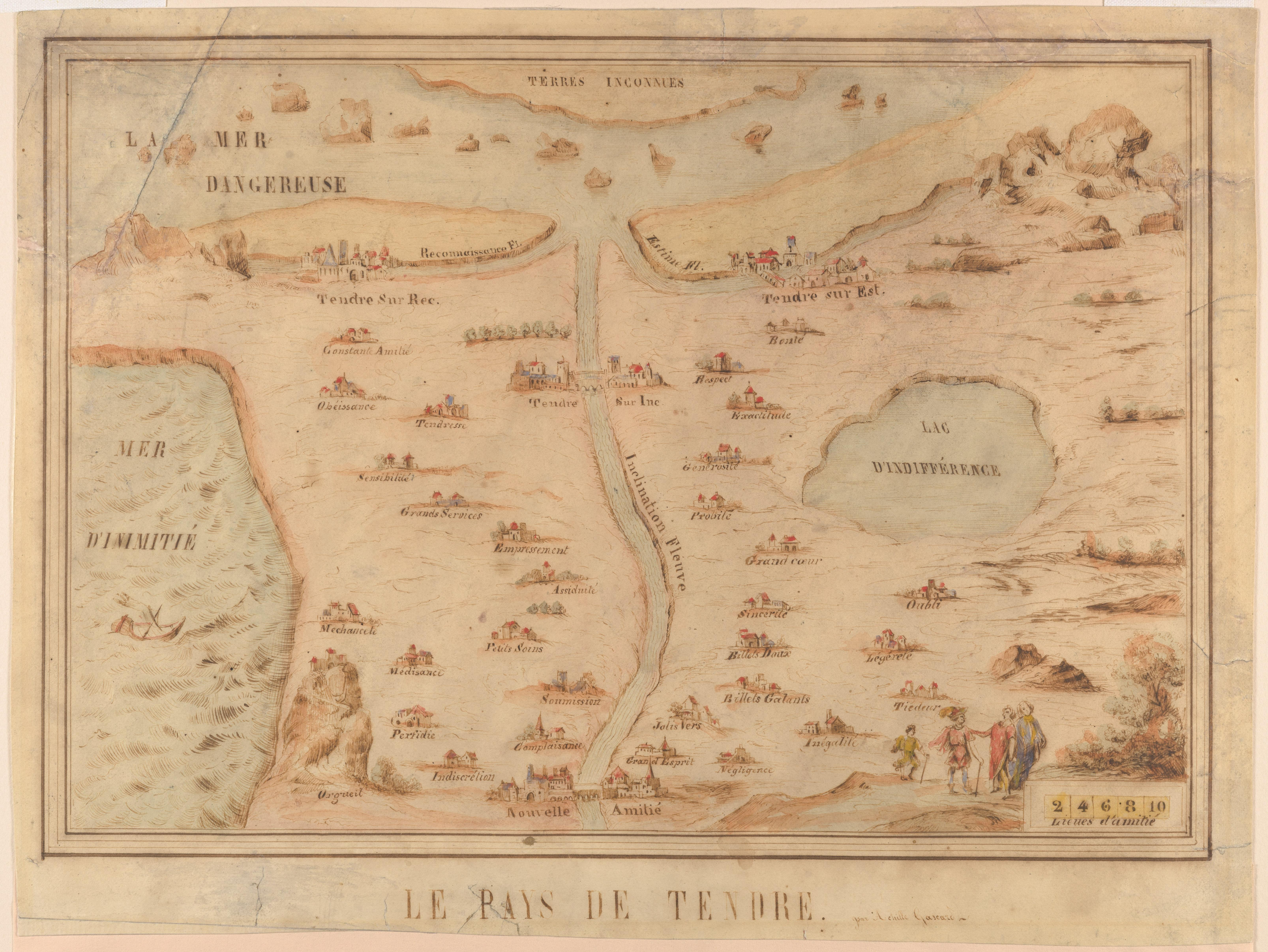
The Carte de Tendre (Map of Tender) was "conceived as a social game during the Winter of 1653-1654" by Madeleine de Scudéry, and a printed copy was "later incorporated into the first volume of her coded novel, Clélie." (Reitinger 1999, 109).

The map shows a geography entirely based around the theme of love according to the Précieuses of that era.

'The way through this pastoral country of the affections begins at Nouvelle Amitié and leads (ignoring dead-ends such as the Lake of Indifference) by three alternative routes to either Tendre-sur-Reconnaissance, Tendre-sur-Inclination, or Tendre-sur-Estime.

On the map the river of Inclination flows directly to Tendre-sur-Inclination, showing mutual affection as the shortest way to love. Unsuccessful suitors, however, have to find their way to love ("Tendre") through two possible routes. One leads through the villages of "Billet Doux" (Love Letter"), "Petits Soins" (Little Trinkets) and so forth and ends at "Tendre-sur-Estime", the suitor having successfully convinced the lady of his worth. The other route leads to "Tendre-sur-Reconnaissance", the names of the villages showing how patience, faithfulness, and constant attention will eventually soften a lady's heart.

Straying from those routes is not recommended, as one might fall into the "lake of Indifference".

Passion by contrast was left on the fringes, where 'lies La Mer Dangereuse, rocky but otherwise uncharted, and beyond that again are Terres Inconnues'.

== Influences ==
'The Carte de Tendre became widely known and frequently imitated, and it came to symbolize the politically and culturally independent role of aristocratic salonnières'.

From a later, feminist perspective, 'in this geography of sentiment the personal is indeed political...placing the female prerogative at the center of civilization' by privileging 'the private amorous contract contingent on woman's inclination'.

== See also ==
- Love
- Lovemap

== Bibliographie ==
Jeffrey N. Peters, Mapping Discord: Allegorical Cartography in Early Modern French Writing. Newark, DE: University of Delaware Press, 2004.
