= Giovanni Francesco Bembo =

Italian painter

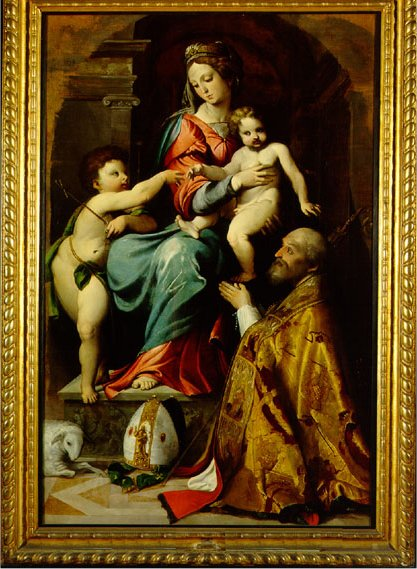
Giovanni Francesco Bembo, The Virgin and Child, St. John the Baptist and St. Nicholas, 1514

Giovanni Francesco Bembo was an Italian Renaissance painter from Cremona, mainly active from 1515 to 1543. He apprenticed with Boccaccio Boccaccino. In 1515, he painted two frescoes: Presentation in the Temple and an Adoration of the Magi for the Duomo of Cremona. He painted an altarpiece for San Pietro depicting a Madonna with three saints and a donor in 1524. In 1530, he painted a Madonna with Saint Stephen and in 1540, a Madonna with St. John the Baptist and a Bishop now in the Museo Civico.

He is supposed to have visited Rome, and thought to be identical with a painter who was there known as Vetriario. Other works in Cremona include in San Niccoló, a St. Nicholas with the Virgin and in San Pietro is a Madonna (1524). His style recalls Fra Bartolommeo.

Giovanni Francesco or Gianfrancesco Bembo, was the nephew of Bonifazio Bembo, the son of Giovanni and brother of Lorenzo, all painters. Giovanni Francesco is said by Vasari to have worked in Rome for Pope Leo X.
