= Bedmar Conspiracy =

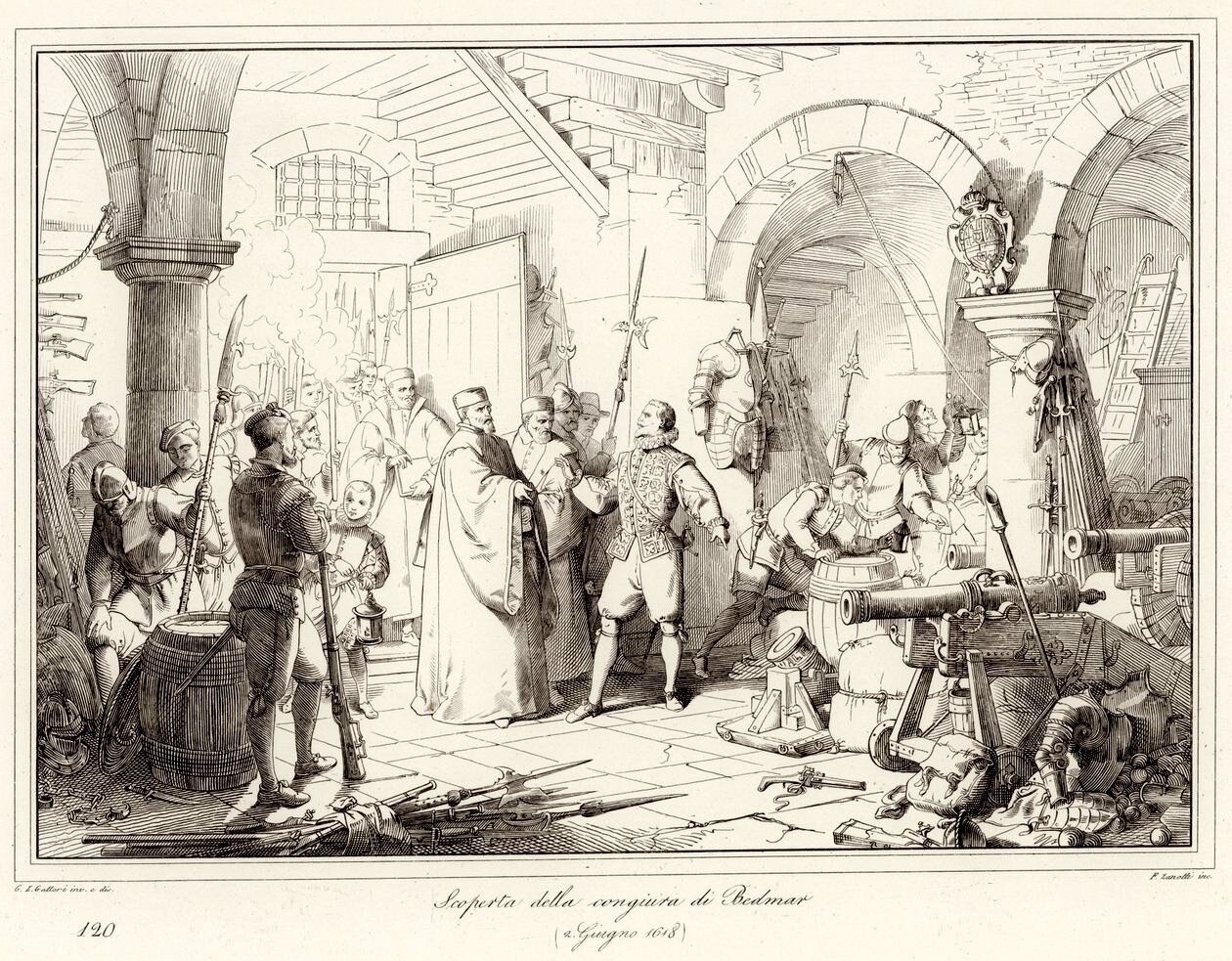
Discovery of the Bedmar Conspiracy, 1863 engraving

The Bedmar Conspiracy was a supposed plot to overthrow the Venetian Republic by coup d'état on Ascension Day in 1618, prompted by the Marquess of Bedmar, Ambassador to the Republic for Hapsburg Spain. It is unclear that there was such a conspiracy, but its reality may have been believed by the Council of Ten. Much of the attention later given to this incident resulted from the 1674 account in French published by César Vichard de Saint-Réal, which formed the source of Thomas Otway's English tragedy Venice Preserv'd of 1682. Contemporary scholarly work has concluded that there is little enough evidence to support the details of the Savoyard Saint-Réal's narrative, or even to conclude that there was a definite plot. Hugh Trevor-Roper wrote:

Was it real, a carefully laid plan to seize the city, or a fantasy generated in the heated atmosphere of the time? We do not know. But whatever it was, it led nowhere.

== Background ==
After the Venetian Interdict was lifted in 1607 by the Papacy, there remained "tense years" of aftermath for the Republic, in the context of the Pax Hispanica, a hiatus in the expansion by military means of the Spanish Empire. The disputed religious issues remained open. The Uskok raiders based at Senj troubled Venetian control of the Adriatic Sea, and they had backing from Hapsburg Austria. A Venetian campaign of 1615 against the Uskoks led to war with Austria, and Spain's support of Austria. Conflict spilled over into the contention over the Duchy of Monferrato, where Charles Emmanuel I, the Duke of Savoy, had in 1613 invaded the territory that had fallen to Ferdinando Gonzaga, Duke of Mantua; France, opponent of the Hapsburgs, backed Charles Emmanuel I, and Venice then aligned itself with France.

Venetian commercial interests in the Levant were suffering from English competition, after the Treaty of London (1604) between England and Spain, and likewise from Dutch competition after the Twelve Years' Truce. On the other hand, Venice from about 1615 was hiring English and Dutch ships, mostly merchant vessels, to support the war effort against the Uskoks on the east side of the Adriatic, an innovation in policy.

== Events in Venice ==
The Uskok War was ended by the Treaty of Madrid in 1617. The War of the Montferrat Succession was wound up in 1618, with a further treaty involving Savoy. But while diplomacy had calmed the military actions, gibbeted corpses were exposed, on 18 May in Venice, as those of alleged agents of Pedro Téllez-Girón, 3rd Duke of Osuna, the Spanish Viceroy of Naples.

It was the day after Antonio Priuli was elected as Doge of Venice. At the time he was engaged in detailed peace negotiations on Veglia (Krk) with the Austrians. The immediate effect was an anti-Spanish clampdown, in what, however, has been called a "labyrinthine affair".

== Historiography ==
Garrett Mattingly in Renaissance Diplomacy (1956) gave credence to the existence of a conspiracy led by Bedmar, with the support of Osuna and Pedro de Toledo Osorio, 5th Marquess of Villafranca, the Governor of the Duchy of Milan. In his view the attempted coup de main was a "sensational failure", not authorised by Philip III of Spain. On the other hand in 1918 Alessandro Luzio, having consulted the Gonzaga archives, concluded that the joint support of Bedmar, Osuna and Toledo was contradicted by the evidence. He took a sceptical line on the Venetian account, regarding it as inflated by fear of mercenary invasion. Further Italian historians who published on the topic include Achille De Rubertis and Giorgio Spini.

Corbett believed the conspiracy was developed without the input of Spain, and that Osuna and Bedmar merely intended to intervene and capitalize on it to take over. De Rubertis found that Charles Brûlart de Léon (Bruslart), French Ambassador in Venice, had stated in a letter that Bedmar had tried to create unrest among Dutch mercenaries, had tried to play down French involvement (Jacques Pierre, a Frenchman, being implicated), and had otherwise considered that one could only judge guilt by the executions. Spini found in Spanish archives that the intentions of Bedmar and Osuna did not clearly match in detail confessions made to the Venetian authorities, even though they had discussed a coup.

== In literature ==
Mackenney traces the "official" view of the Venetian Republic of the events to Paolo Sarpi, in an account attributing the conspiracy to Osuna. It appeared anonymously as a polemical addition to an updated edition of Minuccio Minucci's work on Venetian relations with the Uskoks.

Francis Kynaston's manuscript tract "A True Presentation of Forepast Parliaments", circulated around the beginning of the Personal rule of Charles I in 1629, references the Venetian Republic as a democracy in a pejorative sense, using oppressively exile and proscription against opponents. This criticism may have been based on the repressive measures justified by the Bedmar Conspiracy allegations a decade earlier.

The events of 1618 were covered in the third volume of the Historia della Republica Veneta by Giovan Battista Nani, a Venetian diplomat. Bedmar is named as a covert recruiter on p.157. Saint-Réal's account, published in French as La Conjuration des Espagnols contre la République de Venise (1674), cites as its sources: Nani; the Mercure françois's letter from Venice dated 23 May 1618; manuscript sources including the criminal proceedings against alleged conspirators; and the anonymous work Squitinio della libertà Veneta from 1612. Saint-Réal's standing as a historian has been widely questioned, in this work and also in his narrative of Don Carlos, and his writing has been seen as a type of historical fiction going well beyond the factual, in particular by Eduard Fueter.

The English playwright Otway followed up a success in 1676 with Don Carlos, adapted from Saint-Réal, with his 1682 play Venice Preserv'd on the Bedmar Conspiracy. A grand manner tragedy in blank verse, it relied on Saint-Réal for plot but introduced Belvidera as a strong female character. It remained in the British stage standard repertoire for nearly two centuries.

A play Il Marchese di Bedmar o Venezia e gli Spagnuoli nel 1618 was published in 1847 by Giuseppe Revere. Simone Weil wrote a related drama Venise sauvée during World War II. Saint-Réal's Conjuration was part of her reading in 1938–9. She explained that her reason for retelling the plot was that the motivation of the tragic hero Jaffier, in her view derived from his nobility, was not clear in Otway. Nevin wrote "Although this play contains many sketchy passages, it provides thematic contact with Weil's poetry and concept of grace descending."
