= Calverley Old Hall =

Manor house in West Yorkshire, England

Coordinates: 53.8277°N 1.6856°W

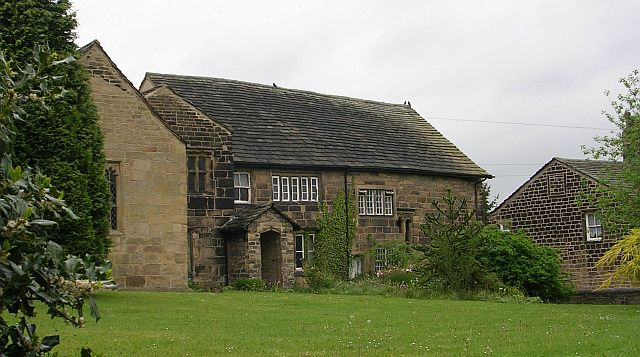
Calverley Old Hall

Calverley Old Hall is a medieval manor house with Grade I listed building status situated at Calverley, West Yorkshire, England.

== Architectural features ==
Unusually, significant portions of the house have escaped alteration and modernisation in later centuries. The oldest section of the property is the solar, believed to be of 14th-century origin. The great hall, which has an interesting six-bay hammerbeam roof, and the chapel have been dated to 1485–1495. Later additions include an accommodation wing added in the early 16th century by Sir William Calverley to house his very large family.

During routine work on the Hall in 2021 colour was seen beneath a small piece of plaster removed from "an undistinguished little bedroom". Further work revealed three walls covered with paintings of a very high standard in the Tudor equivalent of wallpaper, "grotesque work" based on Roman emperor Nero's Golden villa. Such painting was often painted over and destroyed, but these were preserved by being covered in plaster.

== Calverley family ==
The Calverley family settled in Calverley in ancient times and remained for several hundred years. As landowners, the Calverleys were frequently called to military service. Sir William Calverley (died 1506) was summononed to fight Perkin Warbeck's army in Cornwall in September 1497. Walter Calverley (1483-1536) was knighted at Lille in October 1513 following the battle of the Spurs. His son, William Calverley, captured the Scottish laird of Orchardton at the battle of Solway Moss in 1542, and provided 20 soldiers and served as a captain in the campaign in Scotland in 1544. He was knighted at Ladykirk, Scottish Borders, across the Tweed from Norham Castle on 23 September 1545.

The hall was witness to dreadful violence in April 1605, when Walter Calverley murdered two of his sons, William and Walter, after drinking heavily. He was tried in York for murder but refused to plead and was therefore pressed to death. Because of his refusal his property could not be seized by the state, and it passed to his surviving baby son, Henry. The case inspired two Jacobean plays:

- The Miseries of Enforced Marriage by George Wilkins (published 1607). This fictionalized treatment of the case deals with events before the murders and provides a happy ending.
- A Yorkshire Tragedy. This belongs to a different genre from the other play and has been described as "domestic tragedy" or "true crime". The authorship was attributed to William Shakespeare in the first printed edition (1608) but it is now thought to have been written by Thomas Middleton.

In the mid-17th century Walter Calverley (b. 1629) married Francis Thompson, heiress of the Thompson estate at Esholt. In 1709 their son, Walter, built a new mansion house on the site of Esholt Priory and the family left Calverley. After he died in 1749 the family sold the Esholt estate and in 1754 sold the Calverley properties to the Thornhills. Thereafter the hall remained under a single landlord but was subdivided into cottages. The chapel was let out as a wheelwright's shop.

== Conservation ==
In 1981 the Landmark Trust bought the property and converted a 17th-century block for use as holiday accommodation. Full restoration of the site, including the great hall and solar wing, has been a long-term project because of life tenancies. Meanwhile, part of the site is deemed to be heritage at risk, subject to gradual decay pending completion of the restoration. The Trust aims at providing space for community use as well as holiday accommodation.

== Current conservation ==
In 2022 the Landmark Trust began restoring areas of Calverley Old Hall, developing the site into self-catering holiday accommodation. The Landmark Trust launched an international design competition to find architecture firms that could revitalise Calverley Old Hall, in which 75 firms from across the world submitted designs. During a rigorous judging process nine architects were shortlisted, and Cowper Griffith Architect’s scheme was selected as the winning design. The scheme, drafted by Cowper Griffith Architects and realised by the local Ilkley-based contractors Dobson Construction, has helped remove Calverley Old Hall from the 'Heritage at risk' list.

== See also ==
- Grade I listed buildings in West Yorkshire
- Listed buildings in Calverley and Farsley
