= Esholt Priory =

Cistercian priory in West Yorkshire, England

- Interactive map of Esholt Priory

Monastery information
- Order: Cistercian
- Established: 12th Century
- Disestablished: 1540
- Mother house: Syningthwaite Priory
- Diocese: Diocese of York

People
- Founder: Simon Warde

Site
- Location: Esholt
- Visible remains: None

Esholt Hall
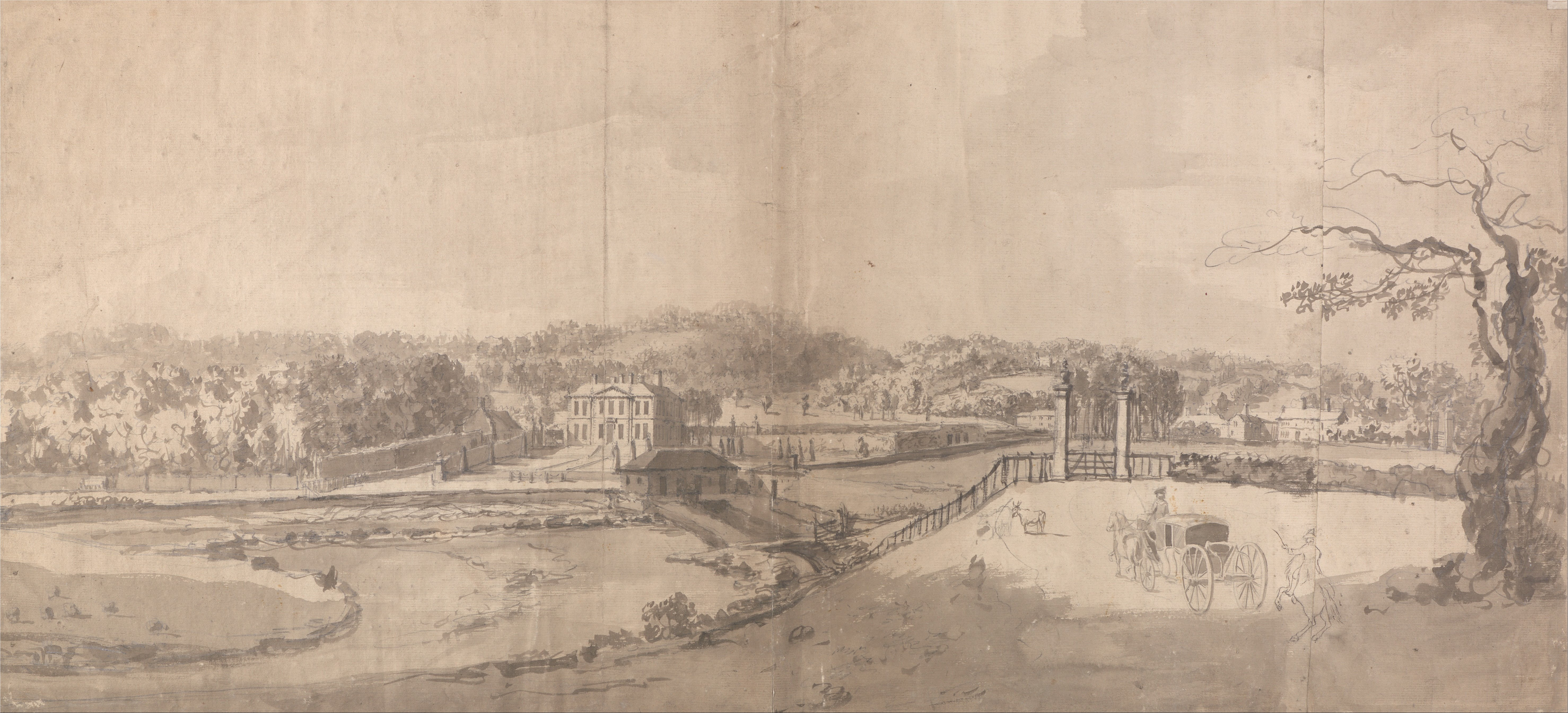
- 18th century painting of Esholt Hall in the grounds of the former priory
- Interactive map of Esholt Hall
- 53°51′10.6″N 1°42′53.5″W
- Type: Private Residence
- Location: Esholt, West Yorkshire

History
- Built: 1706–7

Site notes
- Architectural style: Queen Anne Style
- Governing body: Privately owned

Listed Building – Grade II*
- Official name: Esholt Priory
- Designated: 4 September 1952
- Reference no.: 1133190

Esholt Priory was a Cistercian priory in West Yorkshire, England which was sold after the Dissolution of the Monasteries, and the present Grade II* listed Esholt Hall now stands on the site of the priory.

== Esholt Priory ==
The priory was built in the twelfth century when Simon Warde granted the estate to the nuns of Syningthwaite Priory, an act that was confirmed by his son in 1172 and also in 1185. The nunnery was dedicated to St Mary and St Leonard and was suppressed in 1540 under the dissolution of the monasteries.

In 1303, the Prioress, Juliana De La Wodehall, tendered her resignation to the bishop over a scandal in which one of the nuns got pregnant. Despite this, the bishop refused to accept her resignation.

== Esholt Hall ==
On the Dissolution of the Monasteries, the Esholt Priory estate was given to Henry Thompson. Frances Thompson, daughter and heiress of Henry Thompson married Walter Calverley of Calverley, Yorkshire, and their son was Sir Walter Calverley, 1st Baronet who in 1706–7 constructed Esholt Hall on the site of the Nunnery in Queen Anne style.

His son, Sir Walter Calverley-Blackett, 2nd Bt, sold it to Robert Stansfield (1727–72) of Bradford, Yorkshire, in 1755. It passed to his niece, Anna Maria Rookes (1762–1819) and her husband Joshua Crompton (1754–1832) whose son was the MP William Crompton-Stansfield (1790–1871). After his death in 1871, the estate was inherited by his nephew General William Henry Crompton-Stansfield (1835–88).
