= Listed buildings in Calverley and Farsley =

Calverley and Farsley is a ward in the metropolitan borough of the City of Leeds, West Yorkshire, England. It contains 49 listed buildings that are recorded in the National Heritage List for England. Of these, one is listed at Grade I, the highest of the three grades, two are at Grade II*, the middle grade, and the others are at Grade II, the lowest grade. The ward contains the town of Farsley with the district of Stanningley to the south, the villages of Calverley and Rodley in the north of the ward, and the surrounding area. Most of the listed buildings are houses, cottages and associated structures, farmhouses and farm buildings. The Leeds and Liverpool Canal passes through the ward and the listed buildings associated with it are two swing bridges and warehouses. The other listed buildings include churches, chapels and items in churchyards, public houses, a bridge over the River Aire, a mill building, schools, and two war memorials.

== Key ==
Grade	Criteria
I	Buildings of exceptional interest, sometimes considered to be internationally important
II*	Particularly important buildings of more than special interest
II	Buildings of national importance and special interest

== Buildings ==
Name and location	Photograph	Date	Notes	Grade
St Wilfrid's Church, Calverley; 53.83043°N 1.68502°W		12th century	The tower dates from the 14th century, and it was heightened in the following century, the aisles were added in the 15th century and rebuilt in 1844, and there were alterations and a restoration in 1869–70. The church is built in stone with stone slate roofs, and consists of a nave with a clerestory, north and south aisles, a south porch, a chancel with a north chapel and vestry, and a west tower. The tower has two stages, angle buttresses, a southeast stair tower, a three-light west window, a clock face, a Lombard frieze, and an embattled parapet with crocketed pinnacles. The east window is elaborate and has five lights, and the porch has a crow-stepped gable.	II*
Calverley Old Hall; 53.82779°N 1.68552°W		c. 1300	The oldest part of the hall is the solar, which was originally timber framed and encased in stone in about 1630. The chapel was added to the left before 1488, and the great hall to the right in the late 15th century, followed by the north wing in about 1650. The hall was restored in about 1980. There are two storeys, the hall is in stone, and the roofs in stone slate. In the angle of the solar is a gabled porch. Most of the windows are mullioned or mullioned and transomed, and there is a sash window in the porch. Inside the great hall is a six-bay hammerbeam roof.	I
Barn, Rodley Fold Farm; 53.82428°N 1.66168°W	—	Mid 16th century	A timber framed aisled barn that was encased in stone in the 17th century. There are four bays, it has an asbestos roof, and contains cart entries, a doorway and a pitching hole.	II
Ravenscliffe Farm Barn; 53.81576°N 1.69860°W	—	Mid 17th century	The barn is in stone with quoins, and a stone slate roof with coped gables and kneelers. There are three bays, and the barn contains cart, and doorways with monolithic jambs.	II
Lower Carr Farmhouse and barn 53.83005°N 1.70077°W	—	Late 17th century	The barn was added to the left of the farmhouse in the 18th century. The building is in stone with a stone slate roof, coped on the right with kneelers. The house has two storeys and two bays. The doorway has tie-stone jambs, and the windows are mullioned, with some mullions removed, and those in the ground floor have hood moulds. The barn has three bays and contains a segmental-arched cart entry with a chamfered surround and composite jambs.	II
Old Hall Farmhouse; 53.81433°N 1.69726°W	—	1707	The farmhouse was altered in 1839, and has been divided. It is in stone on a plinth, with quoins, and a stone slate roof with coped gables. There are two storeys and an attic, and a double-depth plan. The original doorway has a moulded surround and a lintel with an initialled and dated plaque, there are two inserted dated doorways, and at the rear are two doorways with shaped lintels. In the ground floor at the front are mullioned and transomed windows with hood moulds, the upper floor contains cross windows, and blind upright oval windows.	II
Grave slab to James Thompson; 53.83023°N 1.68522°W	—	c. 1708	The grave slab is in the churchyard of St Wilfrid's Church and is to the memory of James Thompson. It is in stone and has a decorated surround, and an arched head with a skull keystone, hour glasses in the imposts, and winged angel heads in the spandrels.	II
166 and 168 Town Street, Rodley; 53.82316°N 1.66177°W		Early 18th century	The building, which has been much altered and converted into shops, is in rendered brick and stone, with quoins, bands, and a stone slate roof. There are two storeys and a basement, and two bays. On the front are inserted doorways and windows.	II
Old Poplar Farmhouse; 53.81875°N 1.66382°W	—	Early 18th century	The farmhouse is in stone, partly rendered, with quoins, and a stone slate roof with coped gables and kneelers. There are two storeys, a lean-to on the east, and a single-storey extension to the north. Most of the windows are mullioned, some with hood moulds.	II
Cow shed, Old Poplar Farm; 53.81888°N 1.66406°W	—	Early 18th century	The cow shed is in stone with quoins and a stone slate roof. There is one storey, and it contains a doorway and a two-light window.	II
Wadlands Farmhouse and Cottage; 53.81784°N 1.67959°W	—	Early 18th century	A house, later divided, it is in gritstone with an eaves cornice, and a stone slate roof with coped gables and kneelers. There are two storeys and attics. In the centre are paired doorways with monolithic jambs and lintels, the right door with a chamfered surround. The windows are mullioned, some with hood moulds, and there are two 20th-century flat-roofed dormers.	II
Carr Farm Cottage; 53.83006°N 1.70038°W	—	Mid 18th century	A stone house with quoins, and a stone slate roof with coped gables and kneelers. There are two storeys and two bays. The central doorway has tie-stone jambs, and the windows are mullioned with two or three lights.	II
Church House; 53.83027°N 1.68550°W		18th century	A pair of houses to which a rear service block was added in about 1800, they are in stone with chamfered quoins, floor bands, an eaves cornice, and a stone slate roof with coped gables and kneelers. There are three storeys and a symmetrical front of six bays. In the middle two bays are doorways with architraves, pulvinated friezes, and cornices. The windows are sashes, and in the left return are two blocked taking-in doors.	II*
7 Calverley Bridge; 53.82809°N 1.66551°W	—	Mid to late 18th century	A pair of cottages, later combined, the building is in stone with quoins, and a stone slate roof with coped gables and kneelers. There are two storeys and three bays. On the front are two doorways, one with tie-stone jambs, and the windows vary.	II
4 Calverley Bridge; 53.82826°N 1.66609°W		Late 18th century	A stone house with a tile roof, two storeys and two bays. The central doorway has monolithic jambs, and the windows are mullioned.	II
164 Town Street, Rodley; 53.82317°N 1.66145°W		Late 18th century	A warehouse in gritstone with a stone slate roof, one storey facing the road, and two storeys facing the canal. On the front facing the road is an entrance with a plain surround and a small window. The front facing the canal contains eight openings in the lower storey, and in the upper storey is a loading door with tie-stone jambs and a plain lintel converted into a window.	II
Lodge Bridge; 53.83268°N 1.67733°W		Late 18th century	A swing bridge and an accommodation bridge over the Leeds and Liverpool Canal, it is in iron, and is cantilevered on the south side. The retaining walls are in stone, on the north side the wall rises and narrows, and on the south side is a quadrant recess.	II
Owl Bridge; 53.82825°N 1.66652°W		Late 18th century	A swing bridge and an accommodation bridge over the Leeds and Liverpool Canal, it is in cast iron with a boarded floor. The abutments are in stone, and on the east side they rise to hold the pivot for the bridge. On the west side is a quadrant recess.	II
Rodley Barge Public House; 53.82325°N 1.66249°W		Late 18th century	A house and a cottage, later altered and converted into a public house. It is in gritstone and has a stone slate roof with coped gables. There are two storeys, the main range has two bays, and there is a projecting bay on the right. Most of the windows are mullioned, and the doorways have been altered.	II
Swift Craft Moorings Warehouse; 53.83553°N 1.70254°W		Late 18th century	The warehouse by the Leeds and Liverpool Canal is in stone with quoins and a stone slate roof. There are two storeys and three bays. The middle bay contains a taking-in door with monolithic jambs in each floor, and in the outer bays are mullioned windows.	II
Underwood Cottage; 53.83544°N 1.70237°W	—	Late 18th century	A pair of cottages later combined, the building is in stone with quoins, and a stone slate roof with coped gables and kneelers. There are two storeys and a basement, the doorways have tie-stone jambs, the windows are mullioned with some mullions removed, and at the rear is a blocked taking-in door.	II
Wharf Cottage; 53.82333°N 1.66261°W		Late 18th century	The cottage is in rendered stone with a stone slate roof. There are two storeys and a projecting single-storey outshut on the right containing a porch. The windows are sashes, some with single-lights, and the others are mullioned with two lights.	II
Calverley Bridge; 53.82879°N 1.66503°W		1776	The bridge carrying a footpath over the River Aire is in stone. It consists of four segmental arches with triangular cutwaters and slightly projecting piers. The bridge has a band and a parapet with chamfered coping, and it is paved with setts.	II
Calverley House Farmhouse; 53.82986°N 1.67627°W	—	c. 1800	A stone house with a sill band, an eaves cornice, and a hipped Welsh blue slate roof. There are two storeys and a symmetrical front of three bays. In each bay of the ground floor is an elliptical-arched recess, the middle bay containing a doorway with a fanlight, imposts and side lights. The windows are casements. In the left return is a two-storey bow window and a French window.	II
Thornhill Arms; 53.82884°N 1.68484°W		c. 1800	The public house is in stone with rusticated quoins, gutter brackets, and a stone slate roof with coped gables and kneelers. There are two storeys and attics, a symmetrical front of three bays, and a rear extension. The central doorway has tie-stone jambs, and above is a single-light window. The outer bays contain tripartite sash windows, and in the right return and at the rear are mullioned windows.	II
Stanningley Baptist Church and Minister's House; 53.80329°N 1.66649°W		1827	The former church is in stone on a plinth, and has a roof of Welsh blue slate. There are two storeys, a symmetrical front of five bays with a pedimented gable, and five bays along the sides. On the front are two doorways with fanlights and cornices on brackets, and the windows have marginal glazing and thin lintels. Between the floors is a date plaque with a cornice, and in the tympanum of the pediment is an oeil-de-boeuf window. To the right and recessed is the minister's house, which has two storeys and two bays, and contains a doorway with monolithic jambs.	II
Bottom Mill, Cape Mills; 53.81391°N 1.66135°W	—	c. 1830	The mill building is in stone, and has a stone slate roof with coped gables. There are three storeys, fronts of eight bays, and two bays on the sides. In the fourth bay is a doorway with tie-stone jambs in each floor, and the windows have small panes with opening casements at the top.	II
Leigh House; 53.80390°N 1.66840°W		Early to mid 19th century	The house, later used for other purposes, is in sandstone, with rusticated quoins, a dentilled eaves cornice, and a hipped roof of green Westmorland slate. There are three storeys, a symmetrical front of three bays, and a two-storey two-bay wing on the left. The central doorway has engaged Ionic columns, panelled jambs, a segmental lintel, an entablature, and a dentilled cornice. The windows are sashes with architraves, and at the rear are two round-headed stair windows.	II
Former Bagley Baptist Chapel; 53.81686°N 1.66369°W		1836	The chapel, which has been converted for other uses, is in stone on a plinth, and has a band, moulded gutters, and a hipped roof. There are two storeys, a symmetrical front of five bays, and six bays on the sides. On the front are two tall doorways with fanlights and monolithic lintels, sash windows and a dated plaque. In the left return is a former taking-in door.	II
St John's Church, Farsley; 53.81105°N 1.67179°W		1842–43	An organ chamber was added to the church in 1875–76, the tower was rebuilt in 1895, and the porch was built in about 1898. The church is in stone and in Early English style. It consists of a nave, a south porch, a north transept, a chancel, and a west tower and porch. The tower has four stages, angle buttresses, clock faces, a Lombard frieze and a parapet with corner pinnacles. The windows are lancets, and the east window has three lights.	II
St. John's Sunday School and Church House; 53.81121°N 1.67142°W		1847–51	The house was built first, followed by the Sunday school in 1887. They are in stone and have roofs of Welsh blue slate with coped gables. The house has one storey and an attic and three bays. The central doorway has a lintel with two trefoils, and above it is a single cusped window. The windows in the outer bays have cusped lights, in the ground floor with three lights, and above in dormers with two lights. The school to the left has one storey and five bays, three of them gabled, and an arched gateway to the left, and it contains cusped lancet windows.	II
2 Town Street, Farsley; 53.81131°N 1.67183°W	—	c. 1848	The house is in stone, and has a roof of blue Welsh slate with coped gables. There are two storeys and an attic, and a symmetrical front of three bays. The middle bay is gabled, and contains a doorway with a chamfered architrave and a hood mould, above which is a two-light mullioned window and a small attic window. In the outer bays are two-light mullioned windows, those in the ground floor with hood moulds.	II
Farsley National Schools; 53.81128°N 1.67172°W		c. 1848	The school is in stone, and has a roof of Welsh blue slate with coped gables. There are two storeys and four bays. The left bay in the ground floor contains a doorway converted into a window, and in the other bays in both floors are two-light mullioned windows. Between the floors is an ornamental inscribed band.	II
The Grange; 53.82578°N 1.67818°W	—	Mid 19th century	A stone house on a plinth, with a bracketed eaves cornice, and a hipped stone slate roof. There are two storeys, three bays on each front, and a lower rear service wing with a tiled roof. Steps lead up to the central doorway that has pilasters, an entablature and a cornice. The windows are four-pane sashes, and on the right return are canted bay windows.	II
Lodge, The Grange; 53.82619°N 1.67838°W	—	Mid 19th century	The lodge at the entrance to the drive is in stone with a moulded gutter, and a hipped roof of Welsh blue slate. There are two storeys, a double-depth plan, and a front of two bays. In the left bay is a doorway with a fanlight and a cornice on consoles, and the windows are sashes.	II
Outbuilding west of The Grange; 53.82585°N 1.67854°W	—	Mid 19th century	A coach house converted for other uses, it is in stone with a hipped stone slate roof. There is one storey, and three bays. In the middle bay is a semicircular-arched carriage entrance, above which is a pedimented gable containing an oculus. In the right bay is a doorway with tie-stone jambs, and a window, and garage doors have been inserted into the left bay.	II
The Old Vicarage, Stanningley; 53.80412°N 1.66393°W	—	Mid 19th century	The vicarage, later a private house, is in stone on a chamfered plinth, with quoins, a sill band, an eaves cornice, and a hipped roof in Welsh blue slate. There are two storeys, and three bays on each front. In the centre is a doorway, the windows are sashes, at the rear is a stair window, and in the left return is a French window with a fanlight.	II
West Royd; 53.80801°N 1.67091°W		Mid 19th century	A large house in stone with a roof of Welsh blue slate. There are two storeys, a tower with three storeys, a front of three bays, and six bays along the left return. On the front the left bay is gabled, and contains a canted bay window with an embattled parapet, above which is a mullioned window with a hood mould stepped over a panel. The middle bay projects and forms the tower. It contains a round-headed doorway with pilasters, a keystone, an entablature, and a cornice over which is an achievement of arms. In the next stage is a narrow window with a hood mould, and in the top stage is a window with a pointed head, corner turrets with spires, and a belvedere with wrought iron cresting. In the right bay is a rectangular bay window, above which is a dormer with a coped gable and kneelers.	II
St Paul's Church, Stanningley; 53.80449°N 1.66516°W		1853–56	The church, now converted for other uses, is built in stone with a roof of Welsh blue slate, and is in Early English style. It has a cruciform plan consisting of a nave, a south porch, north and south transepts, a chancel, a north vestry, and a steeple in the angle of the angle of the nave and the north transept. The tower has two stages, angle buttresses, a doorway with a pointed arch, a semi-octagonal stair tower, a bracketed cornice, and a broach spire. The windows are lancets, and the east window has four lights.	II
Former Congregational Chapel, Stanningley; 53.80543°N 1.67074°W		1855	The chapel, which has been converted for other uses, was designed by Lockwood and Mawson in Early English style. It is built in sandstone, and has a roof of green Westmorland slate. The entrance front has a coped gable with a finial, and angle buttresses. In the centre is a gabled porch containing recessed moulded paired portals under one arch. In the tympanum is a corbelled niche containing the statue of an angel, and above the porch is a triple lancet window.	II
Olivet Methodist and United Reformed Church; 53.80522°N 1.66943°W		c. 1856	The church is in stone on a plinth, with angle pilasters, an eaves cornice, and a roof of Welsh blue slate. There is one storey, a symmetrical front with a pedimented gable and three bays, and along the sides are five bays. The central doorway has monolithic jambs, imposts, panelled spandrels, a dentilled cornice, and a blocking course, and above it is an inscribed panel. The outer bays contain round-headed windows with architraves, a sill band, and panelled spandrels. In the tympanum is an oculus, and along the sides are round-headed windows with voussoirs.	II
Methodist Church, Calverley; 53.82960°N 1.68940°W		1872	The church is in stone with a roof in Welsh blue slate. There are two storeys, a symmetrical front of three bays, and five bays on the sides. On the front the central bay is gabled and contains a semicircular portal with a keystone and a dated lintel. This is flanked by small semicircular-headed windows with an impost band. In the upper storeys are three arched windows with keystones and an impost band, and over that is an inscribed panel. The outer bays are recessed with one storey, they are canted, and contain paired round-arched windows, and above is a parapet with carved rosettes. Along the sides the ground floor windows have segmental heads and those in the upper floor have round heads.	II
2 Calverley Lane, Farsley; 53.81543°N 1.67027°W		Late 19th century	The building, which has been used for various purposes, is in stone with a hipped roof of Welsh blue slate. There are two storeys, an attic and cellar, sides of three bays, and the windows are sashes. In the front facing the road is a central doorway with pilasters, an entablature and a blocking course, and the windows have architraves and panelled aprons. In the right return is a shop window and a marble plaque commemorating those lost in the Second Boer War.	II
Lodge Farmhouse; 53.83305°N 1.67998°W	—	1881	A stone house with coved eaves, and a swept pyramidal stone slate roof with a ball finial. There are two storeys, a double depth plan, and three bays. The doorway is arched, it has a moulded surround, and above it is a single-light window. The other windows are mullioned with three, four or five lights. Above the ground floor openings is a moulded hood mould.	II
The Old Vicarage, Calverley; 53.83002°N 1.68619°W	—	1886	The vicarage, later used for other purposes, is in stone on a plinth, with string courses, and a stone slate roof with coped gables and finials. There are two storeys and attics, and three bays. On the front, the left bay has a parapet, and the other bays are gabled. In the middle bay is a semicircular-arched doorway with chamfered jambs, and a moulded head with a hood mould that rises to form a datestone with a fleur-de-lys. The inner doorway has moulded jambs and a false ogee lintel. The windows are mullioned or mullioned and transomed, and in the upper floor of the right bay is a canted bay window.	II
Coach-house, Old Vicarage; 53.83013°N 1.68648°W		1886 (probable)	The former coach house is in stone, and has a stone slate roof with coped gables, kneelers and ball finials. It has an L-shaped plan with a two-storey gabled rear wing. The entry consists of a semicircular arch with a chamfered surround and a hood mould. The building contains a two-light mullioned window, two single lights, a pitching hole, and slit vents.	II
Grey Gables; 53.83092°N 1.69364°W	—	1901–03	The house is in stone with applied timber framing and stone slate roofs, and it is in Arts and Crafts style. There are two storeys, an attic and a basement, the upper storey is jettied, and it has an L-shaped plan with a gabled porch in the internal angle. Most of the windows are mullioned or mullioned and transomed. Other features include bargeboards on brackets, gargoyles, and a balustraded balcony.	II
Calverley War Memorial; 53.82953°N 1.69022°W		c. 1921	The war memorial is on a platform at the entrance to Victoria Park. It consists of a plinth in Portland stone surmounted by the bronze statue of a female in classical dress holding a wreath in one hand and an angel in the other. On the plinth are inscriptions. The platform is enclosed by low walls with chamfered coping and iron railings.	II
Farsley War Memorial, wall and railings 53.81524°N 1.67035°W		c. 1921	The war memorial is in a triangular garden by a road junction. It consists of a stepped granite plinth on which is a tapering pedestal surmounted by the statue of a soldier in battledress with a rifle. There are inscriptions on the base and the pedestal. The garden is surrounded by a dwarf wall with chamfered coping and cast iron railings.	II
