= Rodley, West Yorkshire =

Area of Leeds, West Yorkshire, England

Coordinates: 53.822°N 1.658°W

Rodley
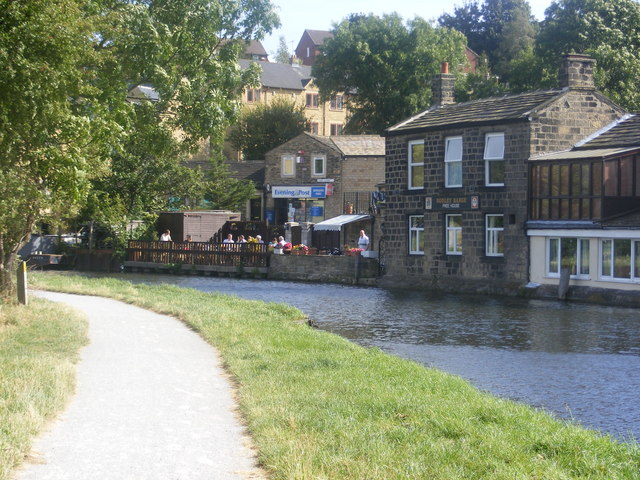
- Leeds and Liverpool Canal at Rodley

- Location within West Yorkshire
- Metropolitan borough: City of Leeds
- Metropolitan county: West Yorkshire
- Region: Yorkshire and the Humber
- Country: England
- Sovereign state: United Kingdom
- Post town: LEEDS
- Postcode district: LS13
- Dialling code: 0113
- Police: West Yorkshire
- Fire: West Yorkshire
- Ambulance: Yorkshire

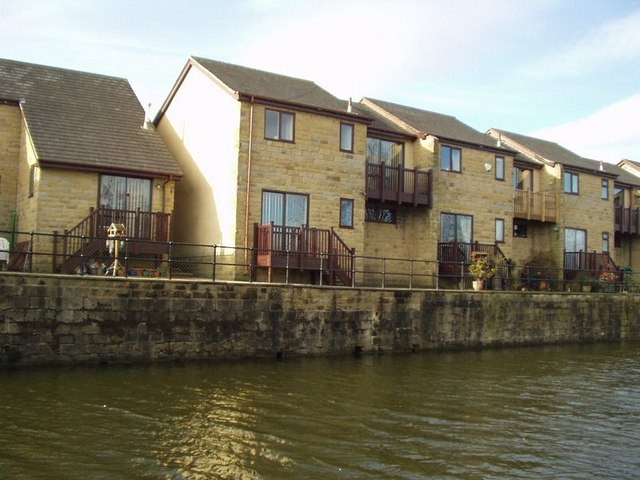
Airedale Wharf, Rodley.

Rodley is a suburb in the City of Leeds metropolitan borough, West Yorkshire, England. The village is situated within the Calverley and Farsley ward of Leeds Metropolitan Council, just inside the Leeds Outer Ring Road, 5 miles (8.0 km) north-west from Leeds city centre and 4 miles (6.4 km) north-east from Bradford. The hamlet of Bagley borders Rodley.

== History ==
Rodley village is not recorded in the 1086 Domesday Book, although several nearby places such as Horsforth, Calverley, Farsley and Bramley are. The earliest uses of the name Rodley appear to be "Rodele", who was listed as a tenant in the Domesday Book, and "Redlega", who was recorded in Yorkshire in 1157.

In the 19th century Rodley was part of the parish of Calverley.

Part of the north-western end of the suburb is in what was, before the Local Government Act 1972, the Municipal Borough of Pudsey; a sign, next to The Owl public house on Rodley Lane, still notes this heritage in 2020.

=== Industrial history ===
In 1820 Thomas Smith's Steam Crane Works was established and by 1888 it had gained a reputation internationally for the manufacture of cranes and lifting gear. In 1847, next to the Thomas Smith works, another crane manufacturer was established: Joseph Booth & Bros, founded by Joseph Booth's father Jeremiah, a former partner of Thomas Smith's father. The cranes produced by these two prominent companies and in smaller numbers by other local ironworks are known as being of 'Leeds Type' or 'Rodley Type', and several examples have been preserved.

Rowley Workshop of Ian Rowley, makers of 3-2-1, Wizbit and Dusty the Dawg, was once housed in the former Bethel Chapel which has been converted into flats since.

The Rodley microcar was made in Rodley by the Rodley Automobile Company between 1954 and 1956.

== Community ==
The Leeds and Liverpool Canal passes through the suburb, running parallel with Rodley Town Street. Many of the stone-built industrial buildings and mills that once lined the banks of the canal have been demolished and replaced with modern apartments and houses, as Rodley has developed into a commuter suburb, being situated roughly equidistant from Leeds and Bradford. Some of the area is now protected as a conservation area.

Rodley has four public houses and a Working men's club: The Railway close to the nearby Calverley Bridge, The Owl, The Rodley Barge next to the canal, The Crown & Anchor and Rodley Social Club on Town Street.

The Rodley Nature Reserve is a wetland reserve created in 1999 on the site of a former sewage works, just north of Town Street on the north bank of the River Aire. On the opposite bank to the nature reserve is Canal Bank Sports Ground, which is the base for Rodley Cricket Club, who play in the Airedale and Wharfedale Senior Cricket League.

== Notable people ==
- Charles M. Maud (1898–1974), World War I flying ace

== Gallery ==
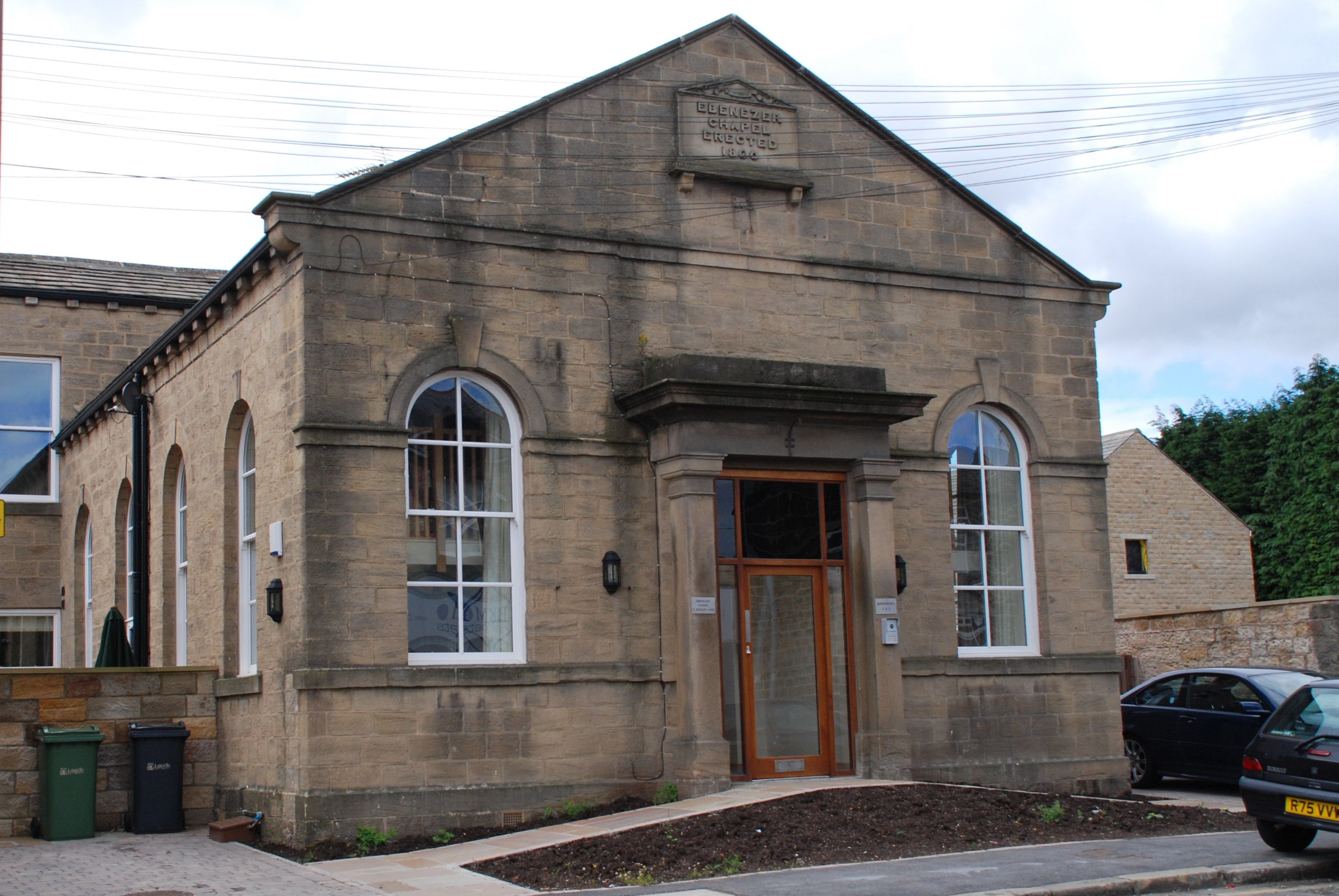
Rodley, Rodley Lane.

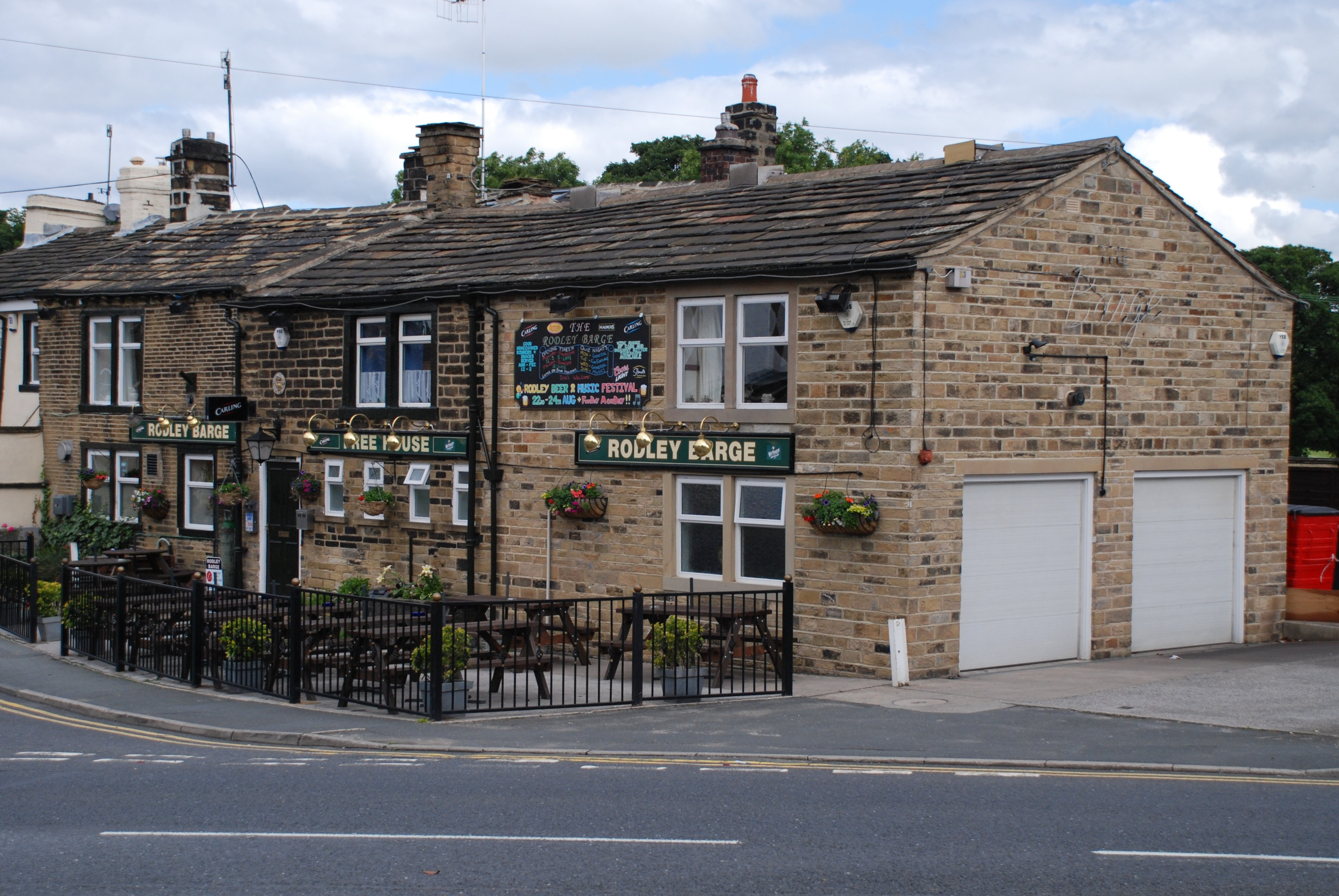
Rodley, Canal Road.

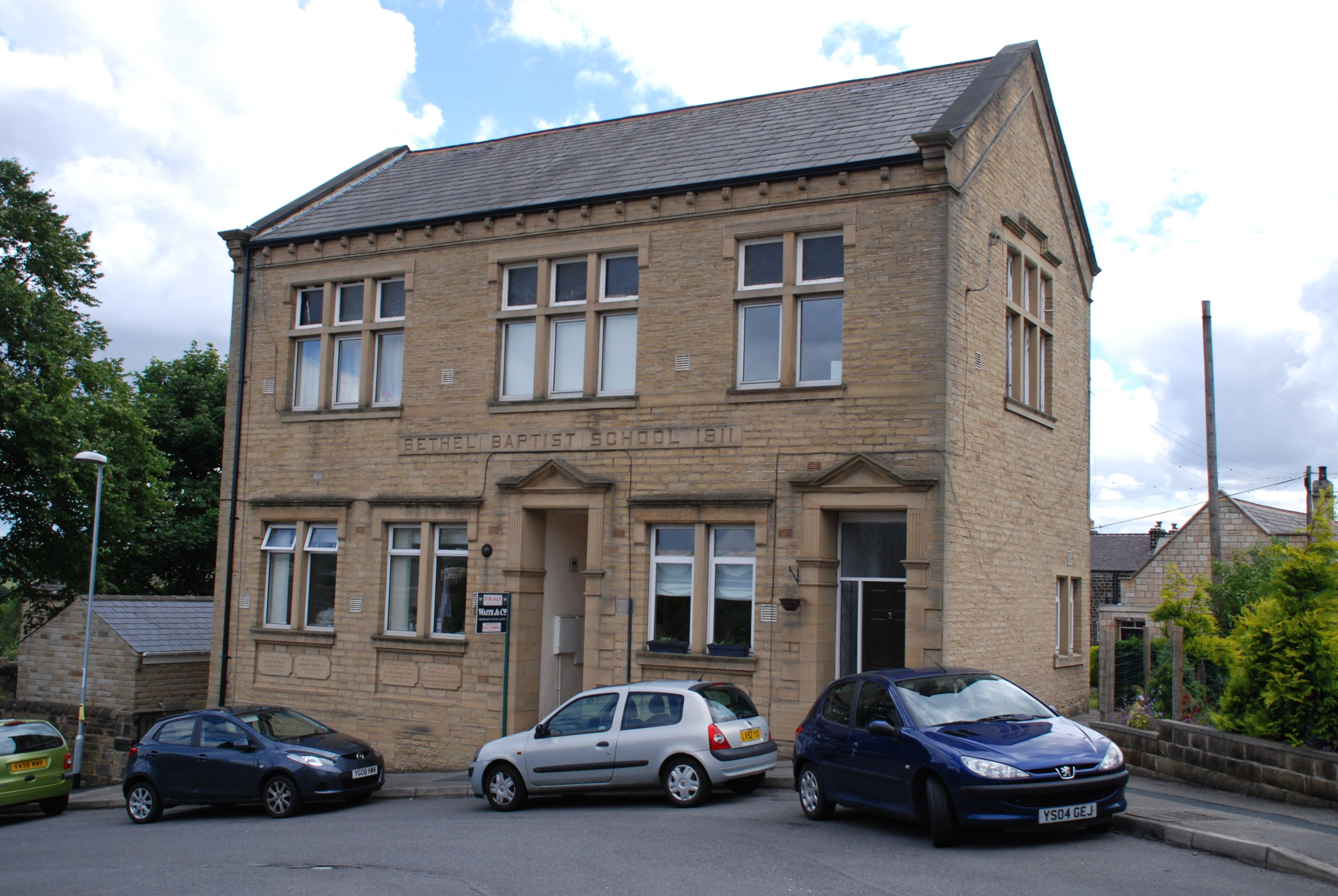
Rodley, Wesley Terrace.

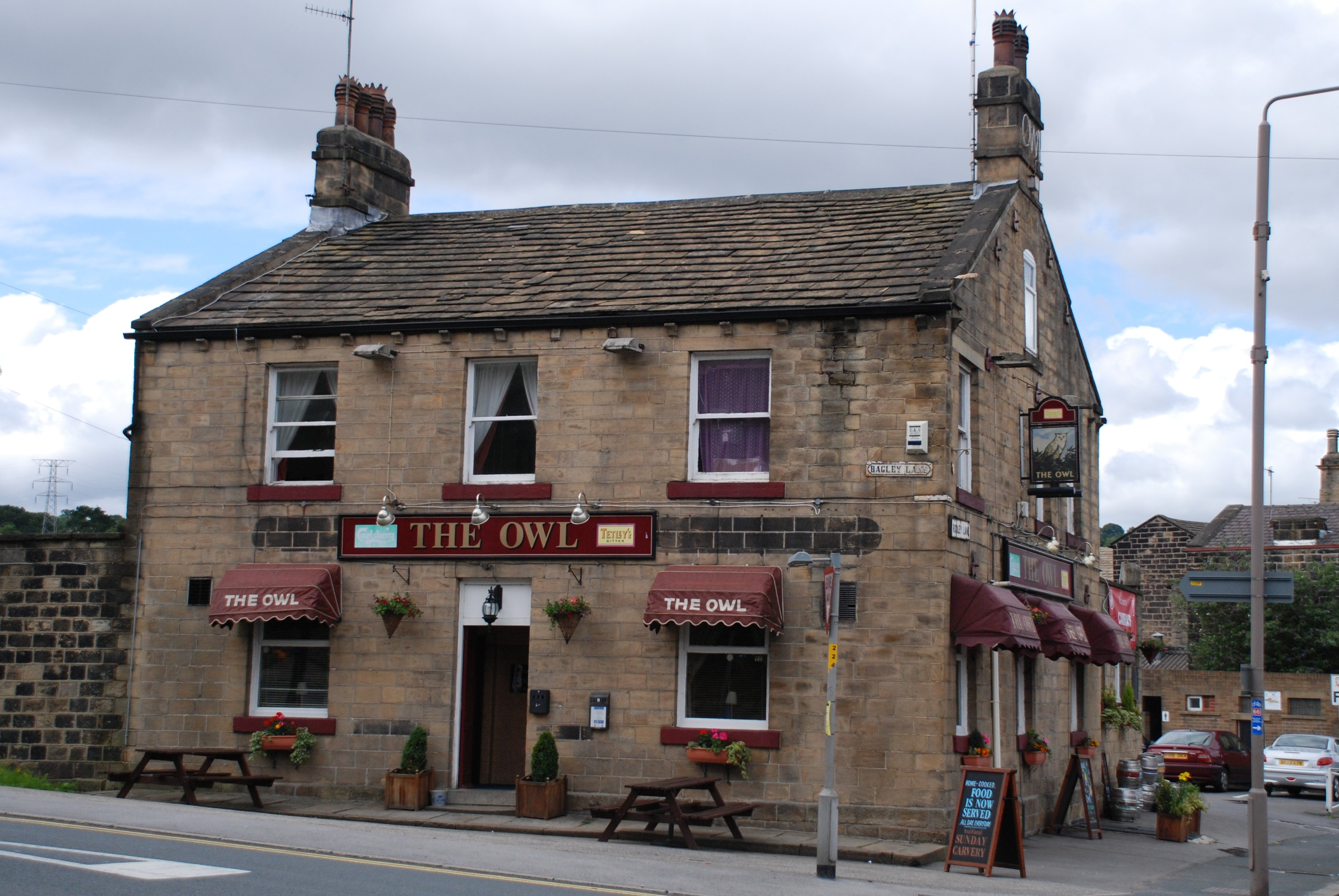
Rodley, No.1 Rodley Lane.

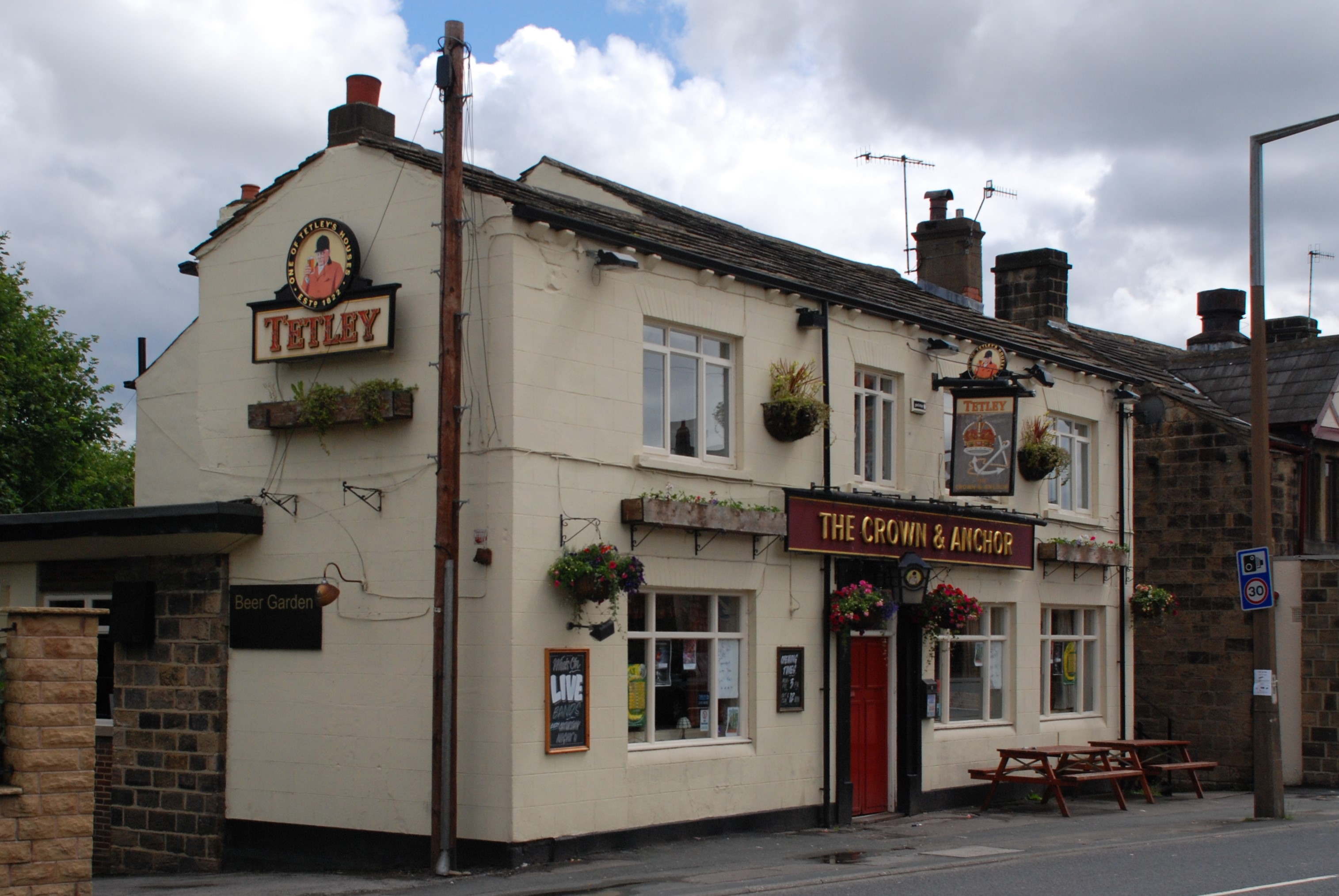
Rodley, Town Street.

== See also ==
- Listed buildings in Calverley and Farsley
- Listed buildings in Leeds (Bramley and Stanningley Ward)
