= Tiny (car) =

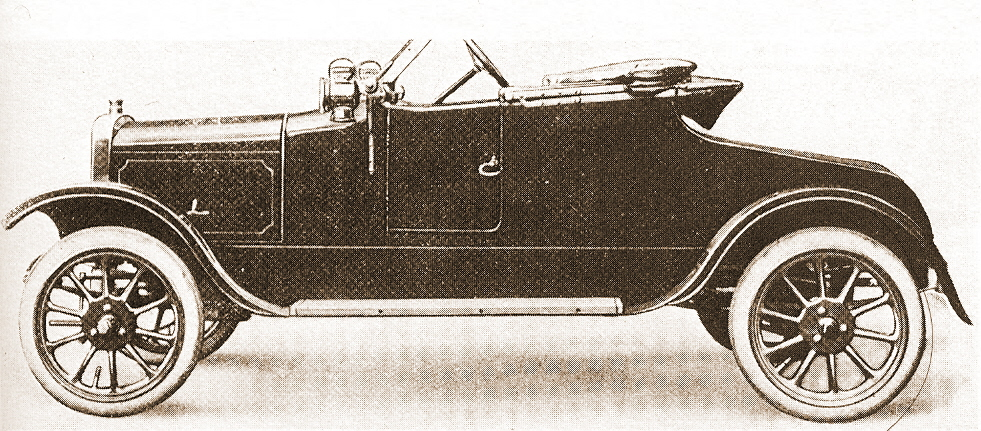
1915 Tiny

Tiny was a British cyclecar manufactured by Nanson, Barker & Co at Esholt, Yorkshire between 1912 and 1915.

The first car, the 8 hp, produced in 1912 was powered by an air-cooled JAP V-twin engine, three-speed gearbox and chain drive. Unlike many cyclecars a differential was fitted to the rear axle. The two-seater bodywork was in aluminium with a wheelbase of 96 inches (2440 mm) and the range included a van. Springing was half-elliptic springs front and rear and braking was by external bands on the rear wheels. The car cost about £100 and was claimed to be capable of 50 mph (80 km/h). It was exhibited at the 1912 London Motor Cycle show.

In 1913 the engine was replaced by a water-cooled Precision, V twin of 964 cc. There were other improvements including changing the brakes to internal expanding and replacing the chain with shaft drive. The price rose to £135.

Just before the outbreak of war, in mid-1914, came the final Tiny called the 10/15. This one was a proper light car and had a four-cylinder Dorman engine of 1177 cc. It cost £157.

It is uncertain how many Tinys were made but output was small.

After the First World War, the same company produced cars under Airedale brand.

== See also ==
- List of car manufacturers of the United Kingdom
