= Charles M. Maud =

English World War I flying ace

Charles Midgley Maud
- Born: 1 April 1898; Rodley, West Riding of Yorkshire, England
- Died: 10 March 1974 (aged 75); Ripon, Yorkshire, England
- Military career
- Allegiance: United Kingdom
- Branch: British Army; Royal Air Force
- Service years: 1915–1919; 1939–1945
- Rank: Wing Commander
- Units: Royal Field Artillery; No. 66 Squadron RAF
- Conflicts: World War I; Italian Front; World War II
- Awards: Distinguished Flying Cross; Mentioned in Despatches; Croix de guerre (France); Croce di Guerra (Italy)

Wing Commander Charles Midgley Maud DFC (1 April 1898 – 10 March 1974) was an English World War I flying ace credited with 11 confirmed victories. After going into business after World War I, he returned to military service during World War II, and served until 1954.

== Early life ==
Charles Midgley Maud was the son of Charles Joseph Maud and his wife Lilian, of "The Rookery", Rodley, Yorkshire. In Charles Midgley's, and his sister Winnifred's (b. 1896), baptismal records at St. Andrews Church in Rodley, his father described his profession as "gentleman". He was educated at Shrewsbury School.

== World War I ==
Maud was first commissioned as a second lieutenant in the Royal Field Artillery on 5 August 1915. He transferred to the Royal Flying Corps in July 1917, receiving a weeks preliminary classroom based training at the No 1 School of Military Aeronautics at Reading, before being posted to No. 13 Training Squadron for his basic flight training. He was appointed a flying officer on 23 December, and on 3 January 1918 was posted to No. 201 Training Squadron for advanced flying training, followed by a final two-week course at the No. 2 School of Aerial Fighting and Gunnery at RFC Marske from 26 February.

Maud was posted to No. 66 Squadron based at San Pietro in Gu in northern Italy, flying the Sopwith Camel single-seat fighter, on 8 March 1918, and soon after was promoted to lieutenant, backdated to 1 July 1917. His squadron was tasked with flying offensive patrols and bombing and strafing enemy aerodromes, but poor weather prevented flying throughout most of April, so it was not until 1 May that Maud gained his first aerial victory, when he destroyed an Albatros D.III south-west of Conegliano. He then destroyed an LVG C south of Oderzo the next day. He went on to drive down 'out of control' an Albatros D.V south-west of Caldonazzo on 10 May, destroyed an Albatros D.III over the Centa Valley on 18 May, and drove down another D.V over Alano di Piave on 20 May, to gain his flying ace status. Maud went on to destroy an Albatros D.III south of San Stino di Livenza on 8 June, and an LVG C south-west of Belluno on 10 July. He gained three further victories in August, destroying LVG Cs west of Feltre, and over Vittorio, on the 5th and 22nd, and a DFW C on the 23rd over Vidor. He was appointed a flight commander with the temporary rank of captain on 1 September, and gained his eleventh and final victory on 7 October, by driving down another Albatros D.V over Oderzo. His tally amounted to five enemy reconnaissance aircraft and three fighters destroyed, with another three enemy aircraft driven down out of control.

His feats earned him the Distinguished Flying Cross, which was gazetted on 7 November 1918. His citation read:

Lieutenant Charles Midgley Maud.

"A bold Scout Pilot, who possesses in a high degree the true fighting spirit. He has shot down seven enemy machines."

In early February 1919 the Government of Italy conferred on him the Croce di Guerra al Valor Militare, and on 24 February Maud left No. 66 Squadron to return to England.

== Post World War I ==
Maud was transferred to unemployed list on 8 April 1919, finally relinquishing his commission on 22 July 1921 on accepting an appointment in the Territorial Force, serving as a lieutenant in the 70th (West Riding) Brigade, Royal Field Artillery, until 22 August 1923.

On 31 December 1929, he broke up his partnership as a wool broker and left the family firm.

== World War II and beyond ==
At the beginning of World War II, Maud returned to military service, being granted a commission as a pilot officer on probation in the Administrative and Special Duties Branch of the Royal Air Force Volunteer Reserve on 14 February 1939. On either 12 August or 5 September 1939, he was confirmed in his appointment, and promoted to flying officer.

When Maud received a mention in despatches on 1 January 1940 he held the rank of acting-squadron leader, but it was not until 22 October 1943 that he was promoted to the war substantive rank from flight lieutenant.

He would serve until 10 February 1954, when he resigned his commission as a squadron leader in the RAF Volunteer Reserve. He was allowed to retain the rank of wing commander on his retirement.

Aside from the medals already noted Maud also received the 1914–15 Star, the War and Victory Medals for World War I, and the Defence and War Medals for World War II, and also the Special Constabulary Long Service Medal awarded during the inter-war period.

Maud died in Ripon on 10 March 1974.
