= Calverley-Blackett baronets =

Extinct baronetcy of Great Britain

Escutcheon of the Calverley baronets of Calverley

The Calverley, later Blackett Baronetcy, of Calverley in the County of York, was a title in the Baronetage of Great Britain. It was created on 11 November 1711 for Walter Calverley. He was succeeded by his son Walter, the second Baronet. In 1729 he married Elizabeth Orde, illegitimate daughter of Sir William Blackett, 2nd Baronet who on his death in 1728 had bequeathed his estate to Calverley, his nephew, on the condition that he marry Elizabeth and assume the surname of Blackett. He and Elizabeth had no children and the baronetcy became extinct on Sir Walter Blackett's death in 1777.

== Calverley, later Blackett, baronets, of Calverley (1711) ==
- Sir Walter Calverley, 1st Baronet (1670–1749)
- Sir Walter Blackett, 2nd Baronet (1707–1777)

== See also ==
- Blackett baronets

Baronetage of Great Britain
Preceded by Lake baronets	Calverley baronets of Calverley; 11 November 1711	Succeeded by O'Carroll baronets
