= Rodley Nature Reserve =

Wetland reserve in West Yorkshire, England

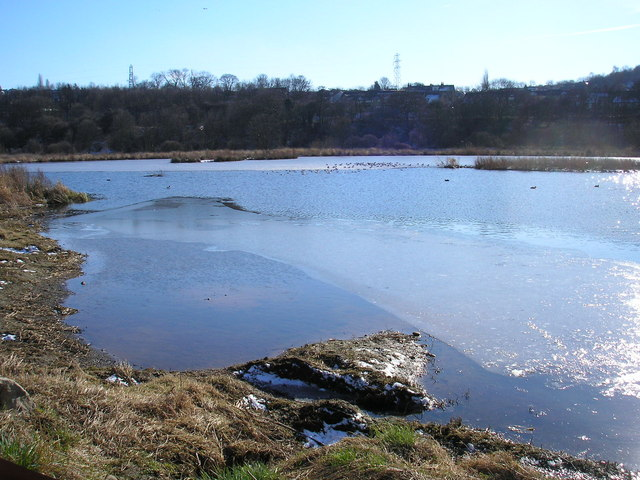
- Rodley Nature Reserve in winter

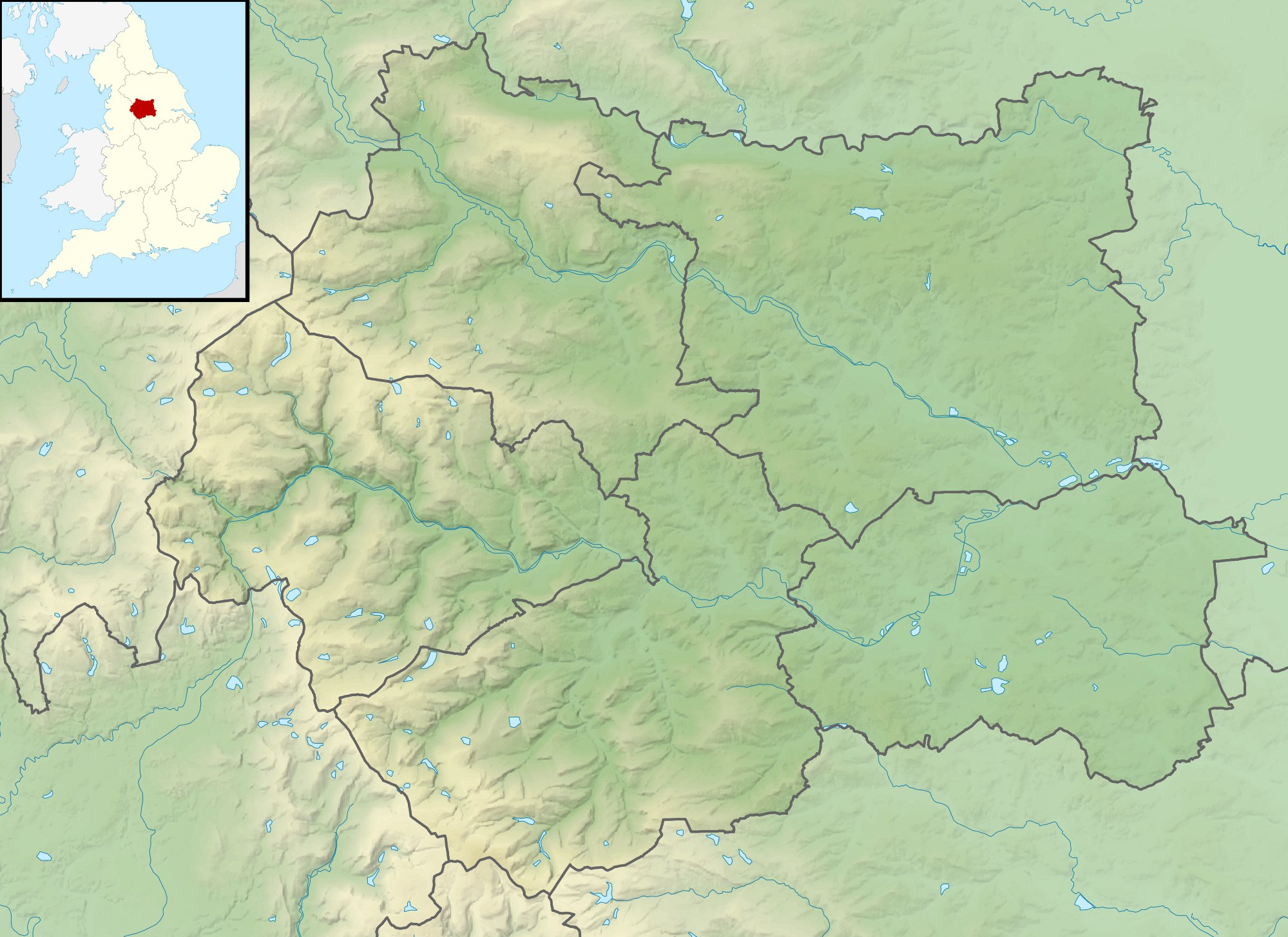
- Location within West Yorkshire
- Location: Rodley, West Yorkshire, United Kingdom
- Nearest city: Leeds
- Coordinates: 53.822°N 1.6461°W
- Established: 1999
- Operator: Rodley Nature Reserve Trust / Yorkshire Water

The Rodley Nature Reserve is a wetland reserve created in 1999 on the site of a former sewage works on the outskirts of Rodley, West Yorkshire, United Kingdom. It is situated just north of Town Street on the north bank of the River Aire.

== History ==
In 1992 Yorkshire Water proposed that the site of a former sewage works be used as a nature reserve. Discussion with local wildlife groups followed and the idea was approved. After several years of planning and fund-raising, the reserve was created in 1999 and opened by Michael Meacher, Minister of State for the Environment, the following year. Between 2004 and 2006, five ponds were established to provide habitat for dragonflies, each one planted with different native species of plant. A further developmental stage from 2007 to 2009 added four more ponds, a long ditch, a marsh and several areas of open water.

== Habitat ==
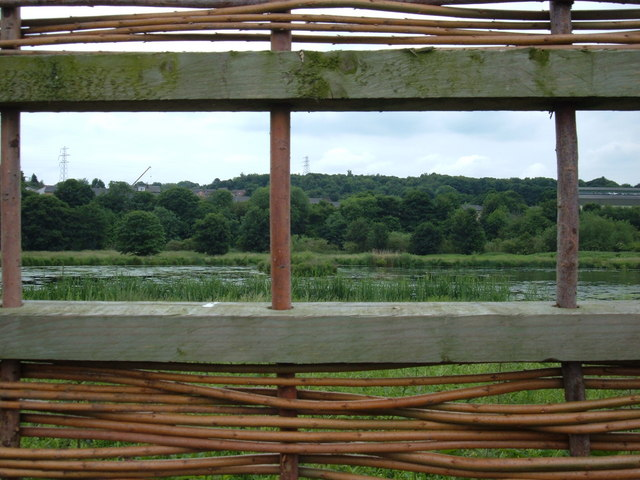
Hide on the reserve for watching birds

The reserve is on a migratory route used by waders and waterfowl. The site floods in the winter and provides good habitat for these birds, augmenting that provided by the River Aire and by the nearby Leeds and Liverpool Canal, a Site of Special Scientific Interest. Apart from the water features, woodland, grassland and scrub are present in the reserve.

== Fauna ==
Frogs, toads and newts breed in the reserve, and fifteen species of dragonfly have been recorded, many of which breed there. Birds that can be seen at any time of year include little grebe, tufted duck, gadwall, shoveler, kingfisher, dipper, oystercatcher, lapwing and common tern. Winter visitors include snipe, water rail, pochard, wigeon, teal and common merganser. Smaller species seen in the summer or all year round include linnet, reed bunting, greenfinch, bullfinch, chiffchaff, willow warbler, garden warbler, grey wagtail, blackcap, common whitethroat and song thrush.

== Facilities ==
There is a carpark by the gate and a visitor centre on site, with disabled parking and toilets adjacent.
