= Rodley (car) =

Rodley 750

Overview
- Manufacturer: Rodley Automobile Company
- Production: 1954-1956
- Designer: Henry Brown

Body and chassis
- Class: microcar
- Body style: 2-door coupé 4-seater

Powertrain
- Engine: 750 cc JAP
- Transmission: 3-speed manual

Dimensions
- Wheelbase: 80 in (2,032 mm) (saloon)
- Length: 109 in (2,769 mm)
- Width: 55 in (1,397 mm)
- Height: 59 in (1,499 mm)
- Curb weight: 1,090 lb (490 kg)

The Rodley was a British microcar designed by Henry Brown and built by the Rodley Automobile Company in Rodley, West Yorkshire between 1954 and 1956. Henry Brown also designed the Scootacar microcar (built between 1957 and 1964).

The body was of steel construction, rather than the more usual glass fibre, and was mounted on a steel chassis. The engine was a rear-mounted, direct driven impeller air-cooled 750 cc twin-cylinder unit made by JAP driving the rear wheels through a three-speed gearbox and chain to the axle which had a friction differential. The suspension was by independent coil springs at the front and underslung semi elliptic at the rear. Steering was by a chain system.

Although the car was advertised as a four-seater and fitted with four seats, the rear ones, as might be expected in a microcar, were rather small and cramped. The fabric roof panel could be rolled forwards to give an opening roof.

Although the production target was 50 cars a week, only 65 were ever built, and only one is believed to survive. It was at the time the cheapest four-wheel car available on the British market but rapidly acquired a very poor reputation, especially for overheating to the extent of catching fire.

== See also ==
- List of car manufacturers of the United Kingdom
