= Walter Blackett =

British baronet and politician (1707–1777)

Calverley's Name Act 1733
- Act of Parliament
- Parliament of Great Britain
- Long title: An Act to enable Walter Calverley Esquire, now called Walter Blackett Esquire, and his Issue Male, to take and use the Surname of Blackett only, pursuant to the Will of Sir William Blackett Baronet, deceased.
- Citation: 7 Geo. 2. c. 4 Pr.
- Territorial extent: Great Britain

Dates
- Royal assent: 21 March 1734
- Commencement: 17 January 1734 (Note: Start of session.)

Status: Current legislation

Sir Walter Calverley Blackett, 2nd Baronet (18 December 1707 – 14 February 1777) was a British baronet and politician who sat in the House of Commons from 1734 to 1777.

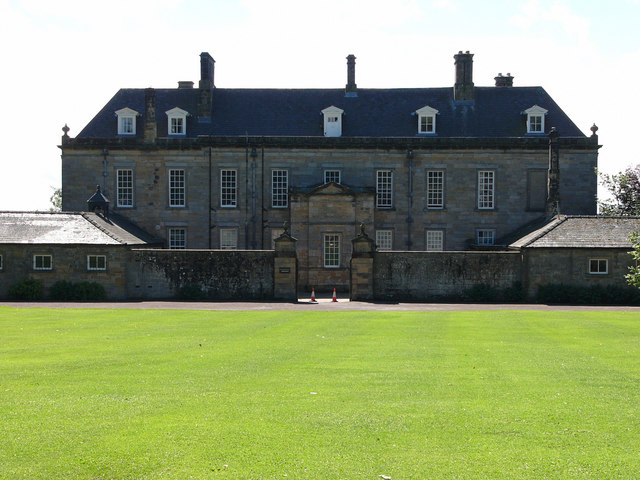
Wallington Hall

He was born Walter Calverley at Otley, the only son of Sir Walter Calverley, 1st Baronet, and Julia Blackett, daughter of Sir William Blackett, 1st Baronet. He entered Balliol College, Oxford, aged 16 on 28 February 1724. In 1728, he inherited the substantial estates of his uncle Sir William Blackett, 2nd Baronet, at Cambo and Allendale, Northumberland, on condition that he married Elizabeth Orde (his uncle's natural daughter) within twelve months and adopted the name and coat of arms of Blackett. The marriage took place on 29 September 1729 at Newcastle. His change of surname to Blackett was later confirmed by a private act of Parliament, Calverley's Name Act 1733 (7 Geo. 2. c. 4 Pr.).

He was High Sheriff of Northumberland in 1731–32 and elected Tory Member of Parliament in the British House of Commons for Newcastle-upon-Tyne over seven parliaments from 1734 until his death. He was an Alderman of the City of Newcastle and Mayor five times, in 1735, 1748, 1756, 1764 and 1771. His philanthropy in Newcastle was fairly extensive including building a library, relief for those made unemployed by the harbour freezing, regular support for Newcastle Infirmary and support for the local clergy.

He inherited Sir William Blackett's mansion at Pilgrim Street, Newcastle and in 1749 inherited his father's baronetcy and estates at Calverley and Esholt, Yorkshire, which he soon sold. He settled at Cambo, where he expended considerable sums on the improvement of Wallington Hall, remodelling in the then fashionable Palladian style to designs by architect Daniel Garrett. In 1755, he commissioned Garrett to build a folly in the style of a medieval castle (Rothley Castle) on the hillside above Wallington.

His wife died on 21 September 1759, and was buried six days later at St Nicholas's, Newcastle. His only daughter, Elizabeth, died young, and on his death in London aged 69 on 14 February 1777 the Calverley baronetcy became extinct. He was buried at Calverley. Under the will of Sir William Blackett his inherited estates passed on the death of Sir Walter to Sir Thomas Wentworth, the eldest surviving son of Sir Walter's aunt. Sir Walter's own estates, including Wallington, which he had purchased outright, passed to the Trevelyan family into which his sister Julia had married.

== Bibliography ==
- Memoirs of the Public Life of Sir Walter Blackett of Wallington, Baronet John Straker 1819

Parliament of Great Britain
Preceded by Nicholas Fenwick; William Carr	Member of Parliament for Newcastle-upon-Tyne; 1734–1777; With: Nicholas Fenwick 1734–1747; Matthew Ridley 1747–1774; Sir Matthew White Ridley, Bt 1774–1777	Succeeded by Sir Matthew White Ridley, Bt; Sir John Trevelyan, Bt
Baronetage of Great Britain
Preceded by Walter Calverley	Baronet (of Calverley); 1749–1777	Extinct
