= Scootacar =

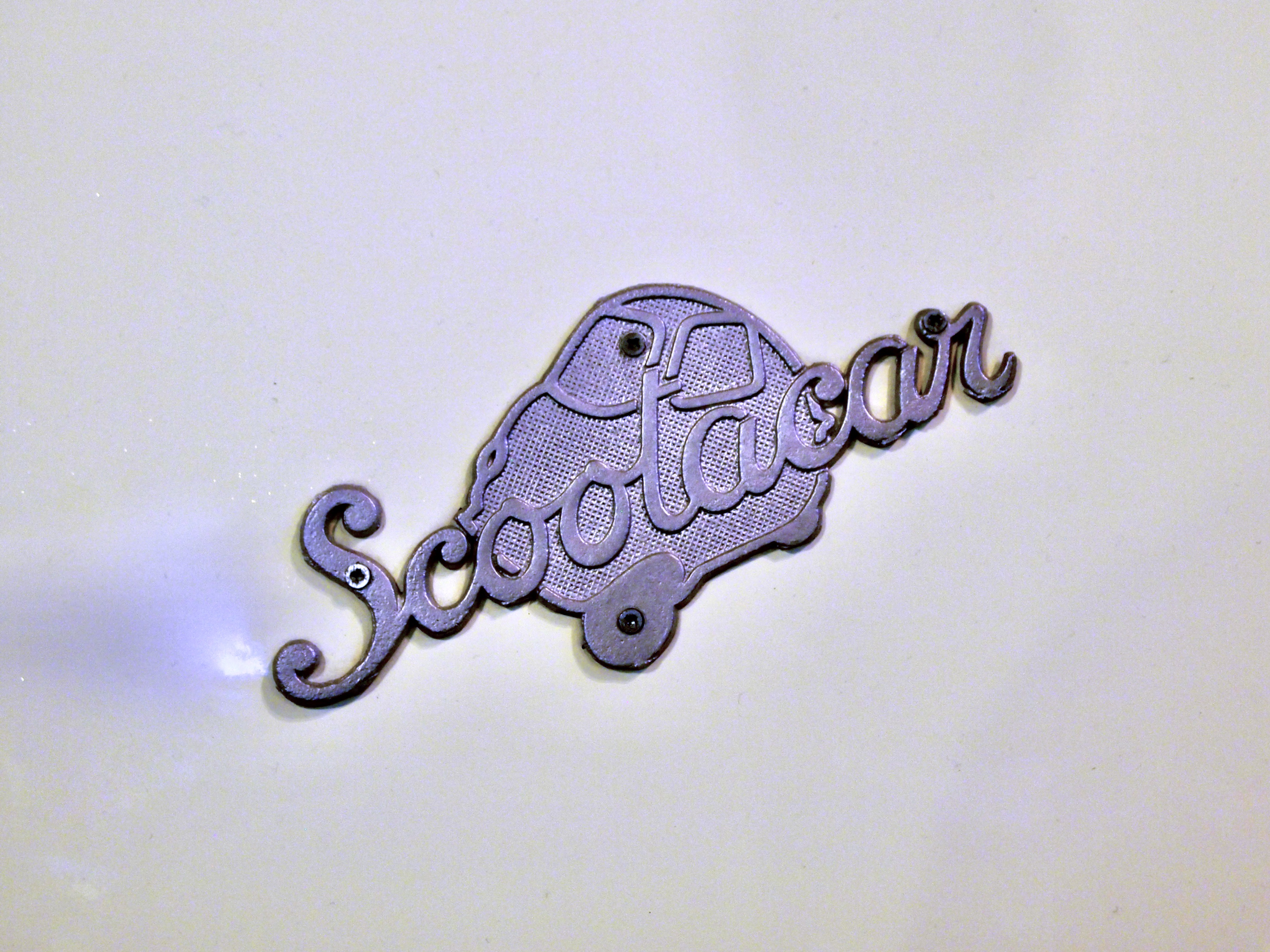

Overview
- Manufacturer: Scootacars Ltd
- Production: 1957–1964; ~970 produced •750 Mk 1 •200 Mk 2 •20 Mk 3
- Designer: Henry Brown

Body and chassis
- Class: Microcar
- Body style: 1-door 2-seater

Powertrain
- Engine: Villiers 9E 197 cc single cylinder 2-stroke (Mark I, Mark II; 55 mph (89 km/h) top speed); 250 cc twin (Mark III; 68 mph (109 km/h) top speed)
- Transmission: 4 speed manual

Dimensions
- Length: Mk 1 : 87”, including spare wheel Mk 2/3 : 95”, including spare wheel
- Width: Mk 1/2/3 : 52”
- Height: Mk 1 : 59.5” Mk 2/3 : 57.5”

Scootacar was a British three-wheeled microcar built in Hunslet, Leeds by Scootacars Ltd a division of the railway locomotive builder, the Hunslet Engine Company between 1957 and 1964.

== History ==
It was allegedly built because the wife of one of the directors wanted something easier to park than her Jaguar. The shape of the car was designed by Henry Brown, previously responsible for the Rodley, who did it by sitting on a Villiers engine and then having an assistant draw an outline around him.

The body was built in glass fibre and was very tall for its size being 60 in (1,524 mm) high, 87 in (2,210 mm) long and only 52 in (1,321 mm) wide. It was nicknamed "the telephone booth". Two people could be carried with a passenger behind the driver or alternatively just squeezed in alongside. Power came from a rear-mounted Villiers 9E 197 cc single-cylinder two-stroke engine coupled to a four-speed motorcycle-type gearbox and chain drive to the single rear wheel. Steering was by handlebars. The car had independent front suspension using coil springs, and the wheels were 8 in (203 mm), with the spare mounted externally at the rear. The top speed was 50 miles per hour (80 km/h).

In 1960 came the De Luxe or Mark 2, with a totally redesigned body with more room and seating for three, but it appeared too late to sell in any great numbers. It had a top speed of 55 mph (89 km/h) and sold for 275 British Pounds.

In 1961 the De Luxe Twin Mark 3 cars appeared fitted with a 324cc Villiers 3T twin, giving a top speed of 68 mph (109 km/h).

Production stopped in 1964 after a total of about 970 Scootacars were made, but only about 20 had the larger engine.

== Restoration ==
For the purist the hardest part to locate on a Mk1 Scootacar is the rear light unit. These were made by a long-defunct company called L.E. Perry or LEP. They are red, as required by law, but have a clear insert on the side of the lamp to illuminate the number plate. They are constructed in a unique larger diameter than a contemporary Lucas light unit (which most Mk1's have to use although then to comply with the law one will have to fit a remote number plate lamp).

It is understood that LEP had a fire in the 1960s which destroyed the moulds. The lens unit is not of the highest quality and tends to fade to orange after the 50 years of being exposed to UV light. The plastic can also craze.

LEP rear light units were not used on any other production motor vehicle. However, it seems they were perhaps sold at Halfords or its ilk as a unit for fitting to homemade trailers, motorcycle sidecars and caravans at the time.

A correct Mk1 will also have a pair of Bluemell reflectors fitted below the rear lights on small steel straps. These appear to have been derived from a child's bicycle.

LEP also made the 12 V Mk1 wiper motor. One can consider this unit equally as rare although it was used in other applications. A similar unit but 6 V is used in both Peel P50 and Trident motorcars.

== Gallery ==
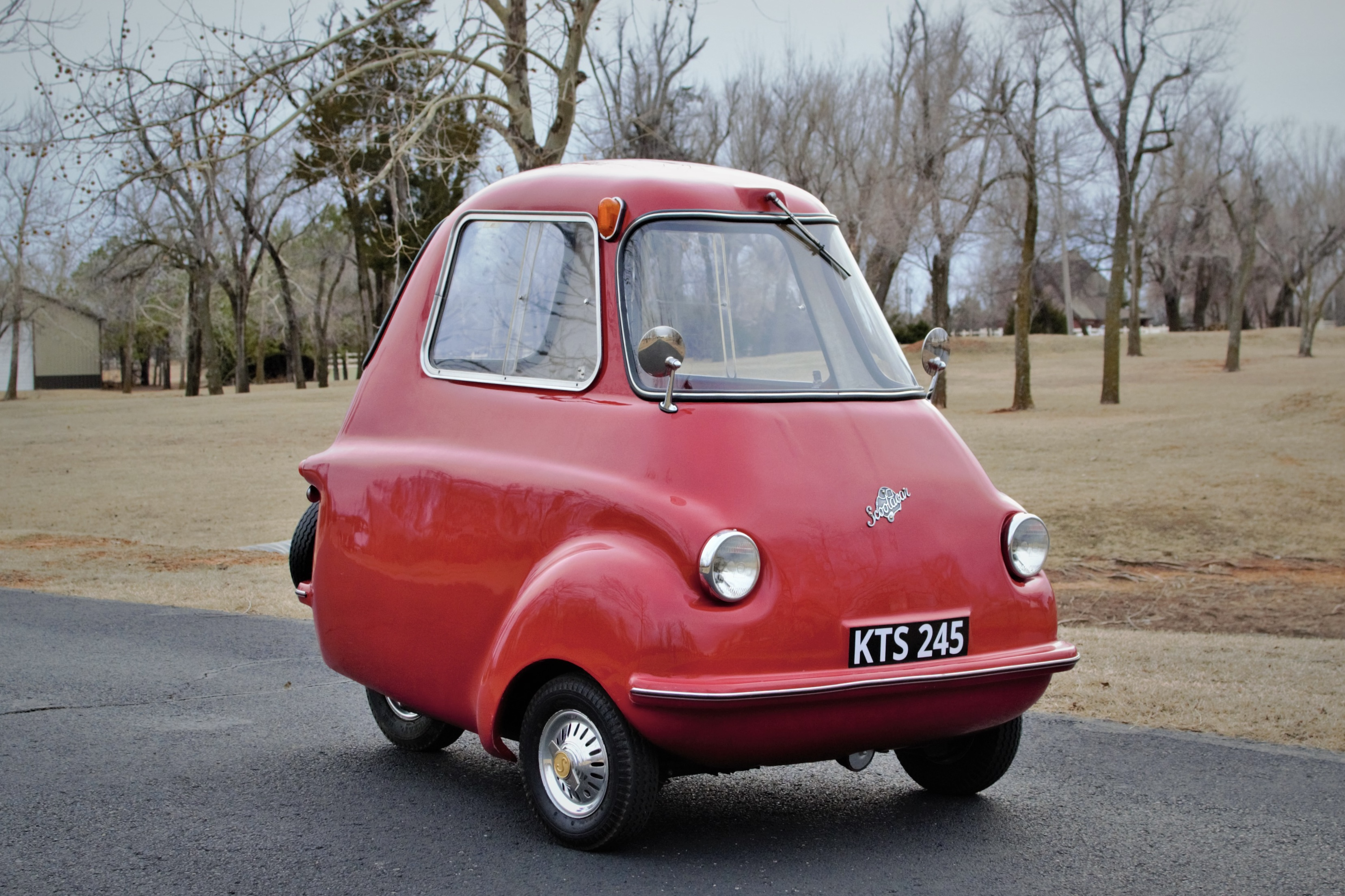
1959 Scootacar front

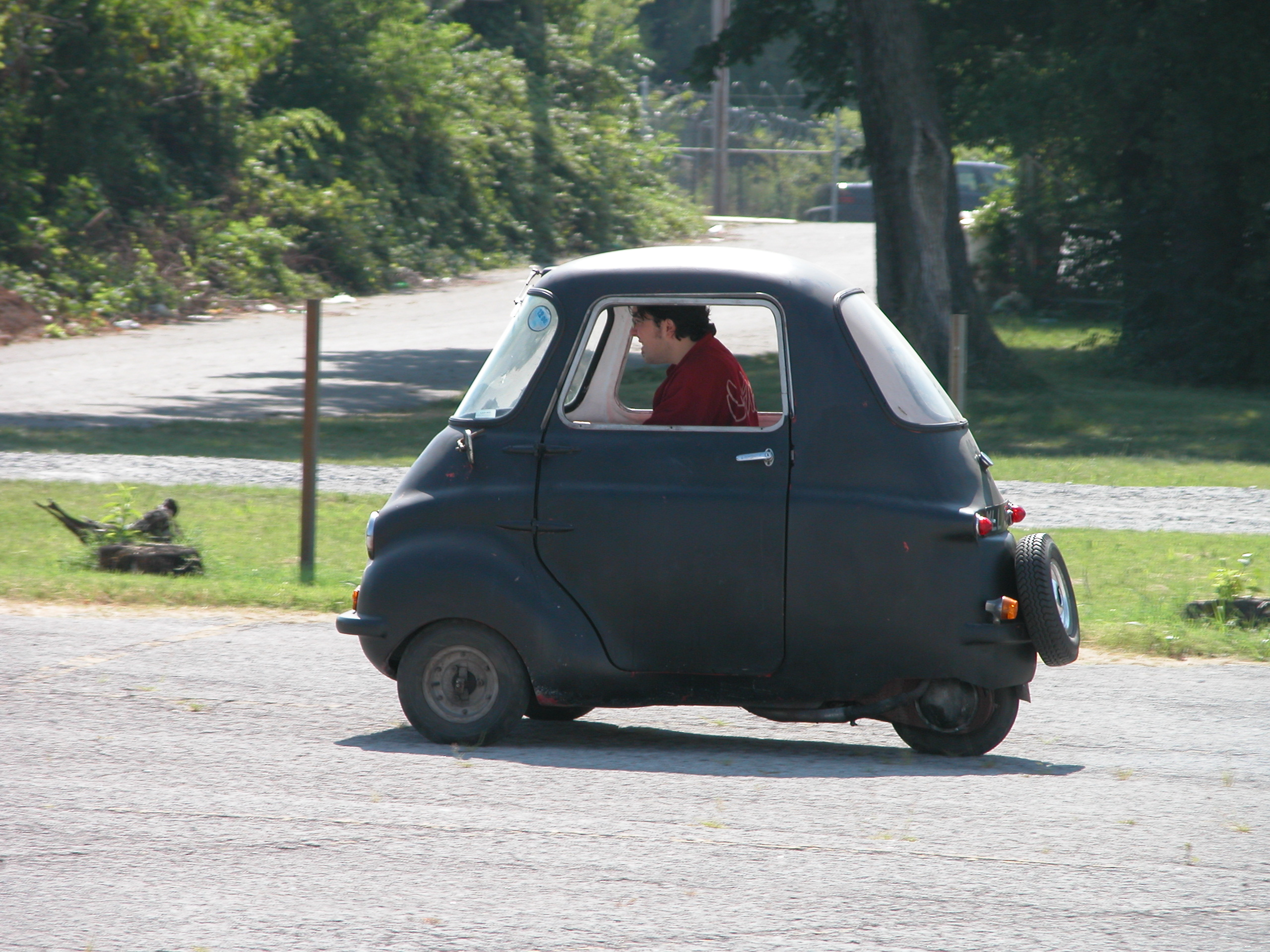
1959 Scootacar driving

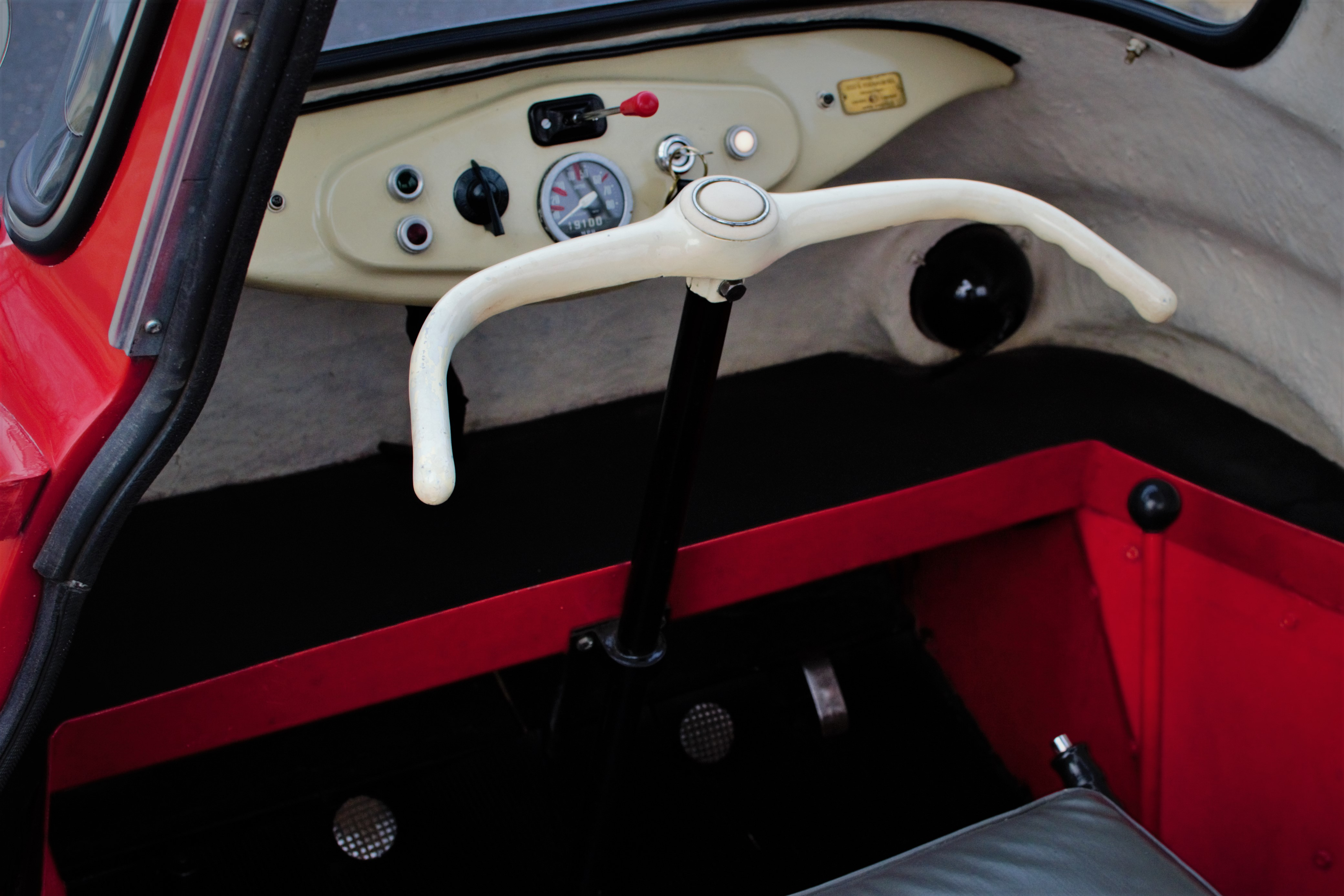
1959 Scootacar controls

== See also ==
- List of car manufacturers of the United Kingdom
