= Bagley, West Yorkshire =

Village in West Yorkshire, England

Coordinates: 53.817°N 1.664°W

Bagley
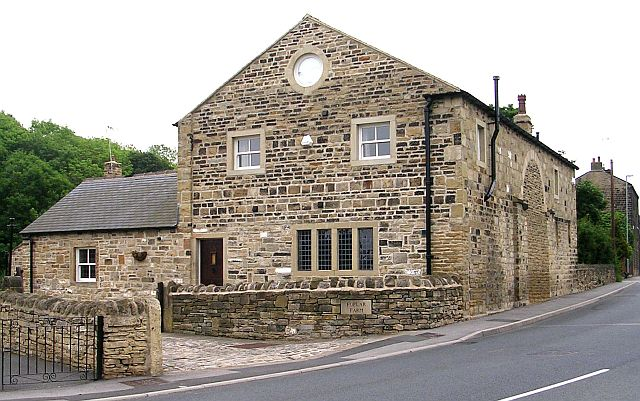
- Poplar Farm on Bagley Lane

- Location within West Yorkshire
- OS grid reference: SE222356
- Metropolitan borough: City of Leeds
- Metropolitan county: West Yorkshire
- Region: Yorkshire and the Humber
- Country: England
- Sovereign state: United Kingdom
- Post town: PUDSEY
- Postcode district: LS28
- Dialling code: 0113
- Police: West Yorkshire
- Fire: West Yorkshire
- Ambulance: Yorkshire
- UK Parliament: Leeds West and Pudsey

Bagley is a village in the City of Leeds metropolitan borough, West Yorkshire, England, once in the township of Farsley. The remains of the village (or hamlet) are on Bagley Lane, on the section between the A657 road in Rodley and the junction with Coalhill Lane.

== Etymology ==
The name of Bagley is first attested in both its current spelling and the form Baglay in 1344. The second element comes from Old English lēah ('open land in a wood'). While the etymology of the first element is uncertain, it is thought to be from a putative Old English word *bagga ('badger'). Thus the name probably once meant 'clearing characterised by badgers'.

== Geography ==
A number of old buildings in the area have survived, including the former Bagley Baptist Church, a Grade II listed building, located on Bagley Lane. A nearby stream, known as Bagley Beck, runs past the place on its way to the River Aire, crossing underneath the Leeds and Liverpool Canal at Rodley.
