= Airedale (automobile) =

Airedale 12 hp
- The Airedale badge

Overview
- Manufacturer: Airedale Cars Ltd
- Production: 1919–1924; 90 approx produced

Body and chassis
- Body style: open two-seater, open four-seater, coupé

Powertrain
- Engine: 1795 or 2120 cc four-cylinder
- Transmission: 4-speed manual

Dimensions
- Wheelbase: 117 in (2,972 mm)
- Length: 156 in (3,962 mm)

Chronology
- Predecessor: Tiny
- Successor: none

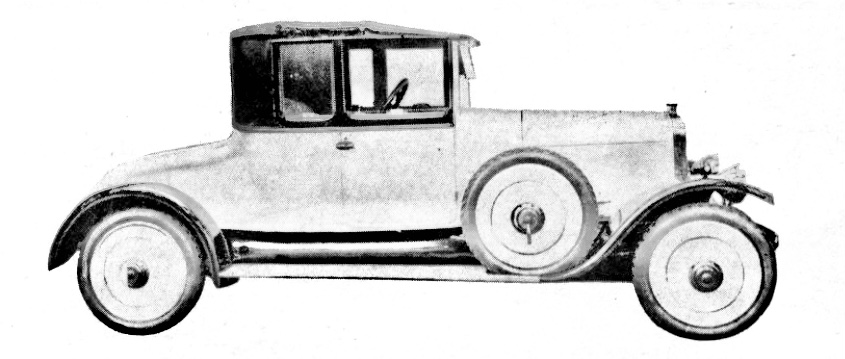
Airedale 13.9 (1922-1924)

The Airedale is an English automobile made in Esholt, near Shipley, West Yorkshire. It was the successor to the Tiny made by Nanson, Barker & Co in the same town from 1911 until the outbreak of war in 1914.

== History ==
After the war in 1919 a larger car was developed and the company name changed to Airedale. This new model was rated at 12 hp and had a 1795 cc four-cylinder overhead-valve Dorman KNO engine with Zenith carburettor producing 22 bhp (16 kW; 22 PS) at 1500 rpm. Drive to the rear wheels was through a four-speed gearbox and plate clutch. The car had a wheelbase of 9 feet 9 inches (2.97 m) and overall length of 13 feet (4.0 m) with conventional half elliptic leaf springs all round. It seems to have also been known as the 12/24 and 11.9 hp. In 1922 they had sufficient confidence to take a stand at the London Motor Show and the name of the company was changed from Nanson, Barker and Company to Airedale Cars. The cars at the show were priced at £575 for a special coupé, £435 for a 4-seat tourer, £425 for a 2-seater with dickey and £375 for a bare chassis.

A larger Meadows engine of 2120 cc was offered in the similar 14hp model from 1922. This car was slightly larger with a 10 feet 3 inches (3.12 m) wheelbase and 13 feet 6 inches (4.11 m) total length. A bare chassis was £360, an open two-seater cost £425 and a limousine £625.

Apart from the engines nearly all parts including gearboxes were made on site by Airedale themselves. The cars were very well finished and equipped, which made them expensive. Approximately 90 cars were made, about 55 of the 12 hp and 35 of the 14 hp models.

The company went into liquidation in September 1924, a revival was attempted in 1927 but also failed. No cars are known to survive.

== See also ==
- List of car manufacturers of the United Kingdom
