= Charles Smith (cricketer, born 1861) =

English cricketer

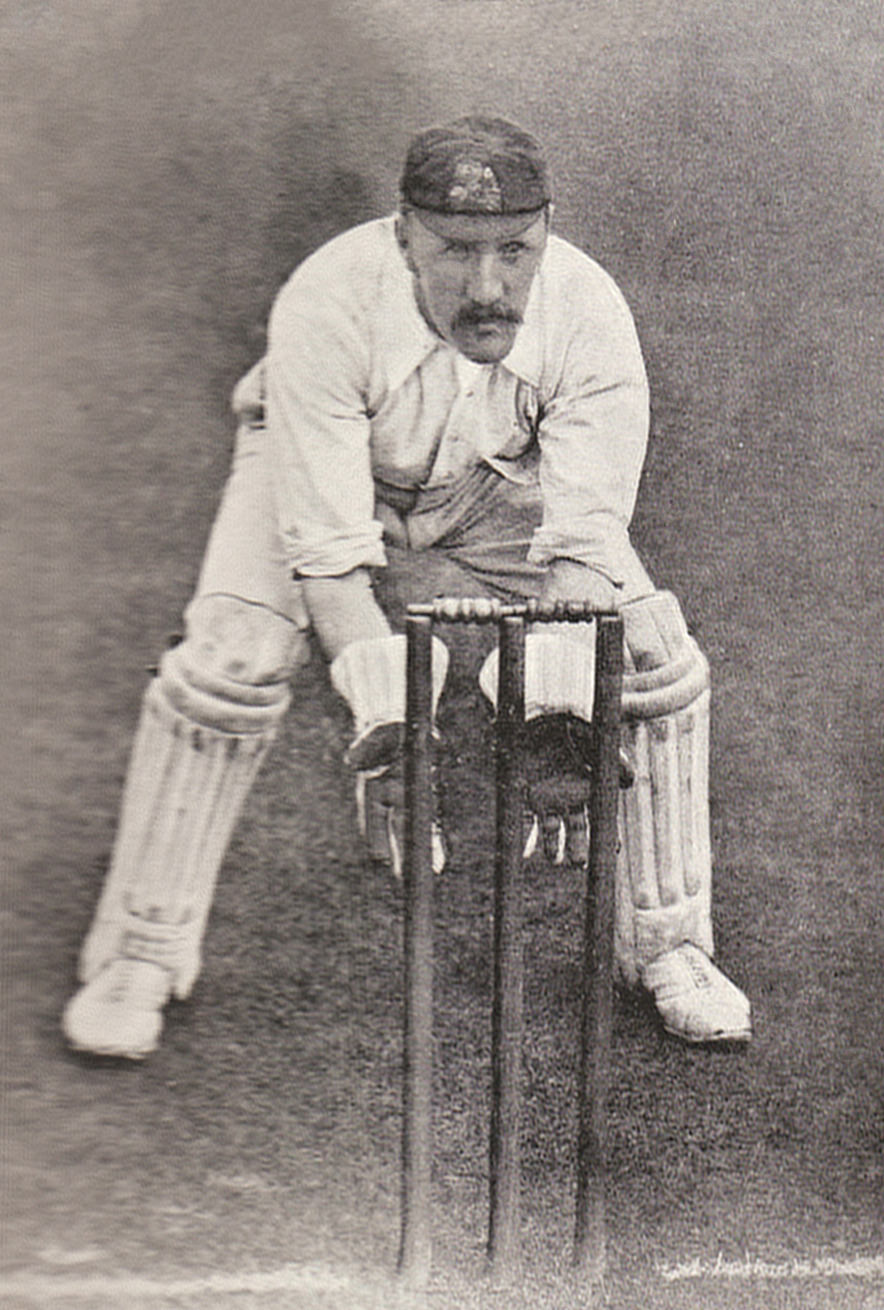

Personal information
- Full name: Charles Smith
- Born: 24 August 1861; Calverley, Yorkshire, England
- Died: 2 May 1925 (aged 63); Calverley, Yorkshire, England
- Batting: Right-handed
- Role: Wicket-keeper

Domestic team information
- Years: Team
- 1893–1902: Lancashire
- 1896: CE de Traffords XI

Career statistics
Competition	First-class
Matches	168
Runs scored	2,251
Batting average	12.10
100s/50s	0/4
Top score	81
Balls bowled	24
Wickets	1
Bowling average	18.00
5 wickets in innings	0
10 wickets in match	0
Best bowling	1/18
Catches/stumpings	318/119
- Source: CricketArchive, 11 June 2012

Charles Smith (24 August 1861 – 2 May 1925) was an English cricketer who played for Lancashire between 1893 and 1902.

== Career ==
Smith made his first-class debut against Nottinghamshire at Trent Bridge on 15 June 1893. He played 168 matches for Lancashire with his last match on 14 July 1902 versus Worcestershire at the County Ground, Worcester.

In 1903, Lancashire held a benefit season for Smith which raised £657 shared jointly with Willis Cuttell.
