= Sir Walter Calverley, 1st Baronet =

British baronet

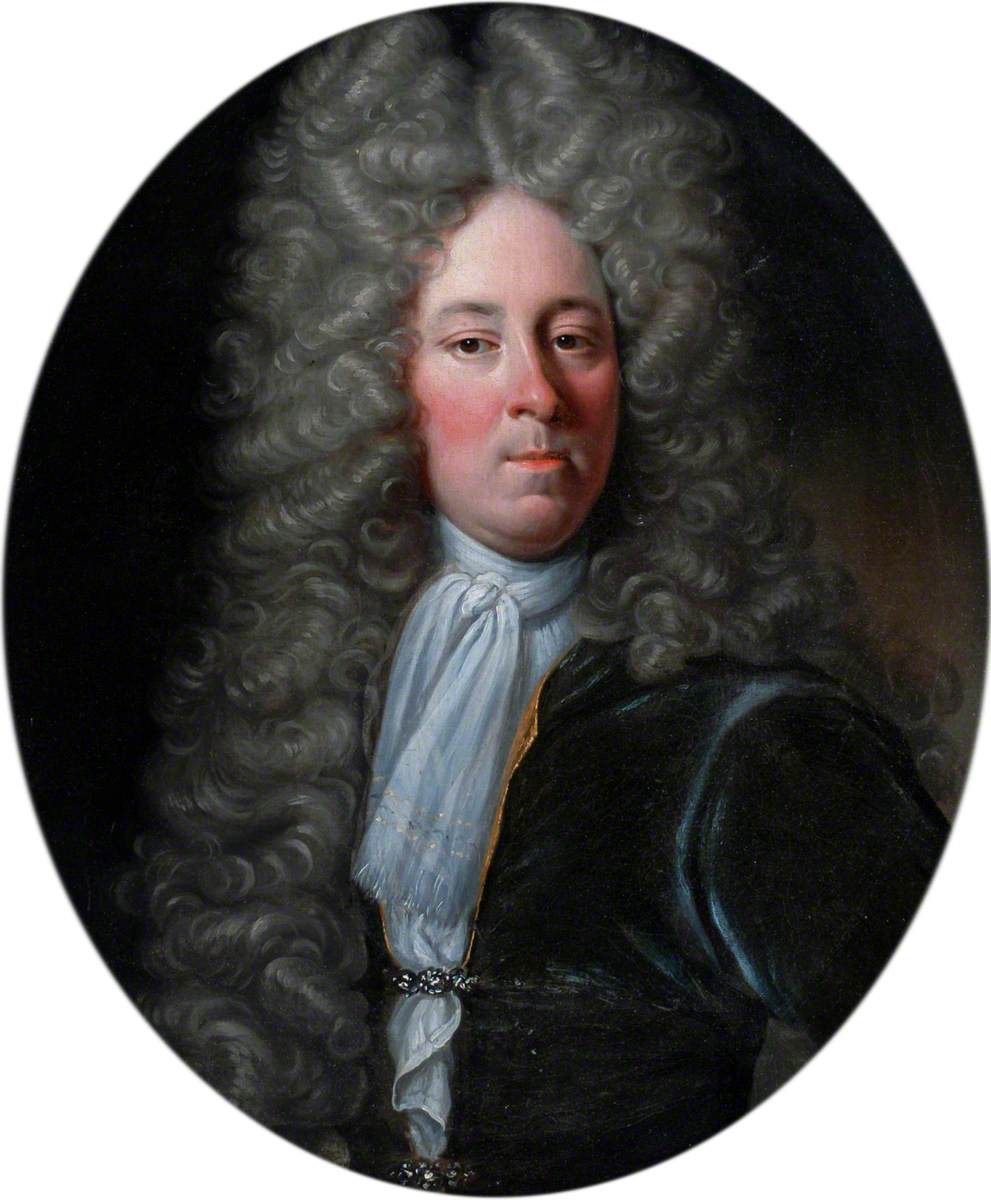
Calverley in 1706, by John Closterman

Sir Walter Calverley, 1st Baronet (1670 – 15 October 1749) was an English aristocrat.

He was the only son of Walter Calverley of Calverley, Yorkshire, and Frances Thompson, daughter and heiress of Henry Thompson of Esholt, Yorkshire. He was baptised on 16 January 1670 at Calverley, and matriculated at Queen's College, Oxford, on 30 June 1687, aged 17.

He married Julia Blackett, eldest daughter of Sir William Blackett on 7 January 1707 at Newcastle. In about 1709, he completed the building of a new house at Esholt Hall, Esholt.

He was created a baronet on 11 December 1711. His wife died on 17 September 1736; he died on 15 October 1749, aged 79, and was buried at Calverley. He was succeeded by his son Walter.

Baronetage of Great Britain
New title	Baronet (of Calverley); 1711–1749	Succeeded by Walter Calverley
