= Esholt =

Village in West Yorkshire, England

Coordinates: 53.8585°N 1.7245°W

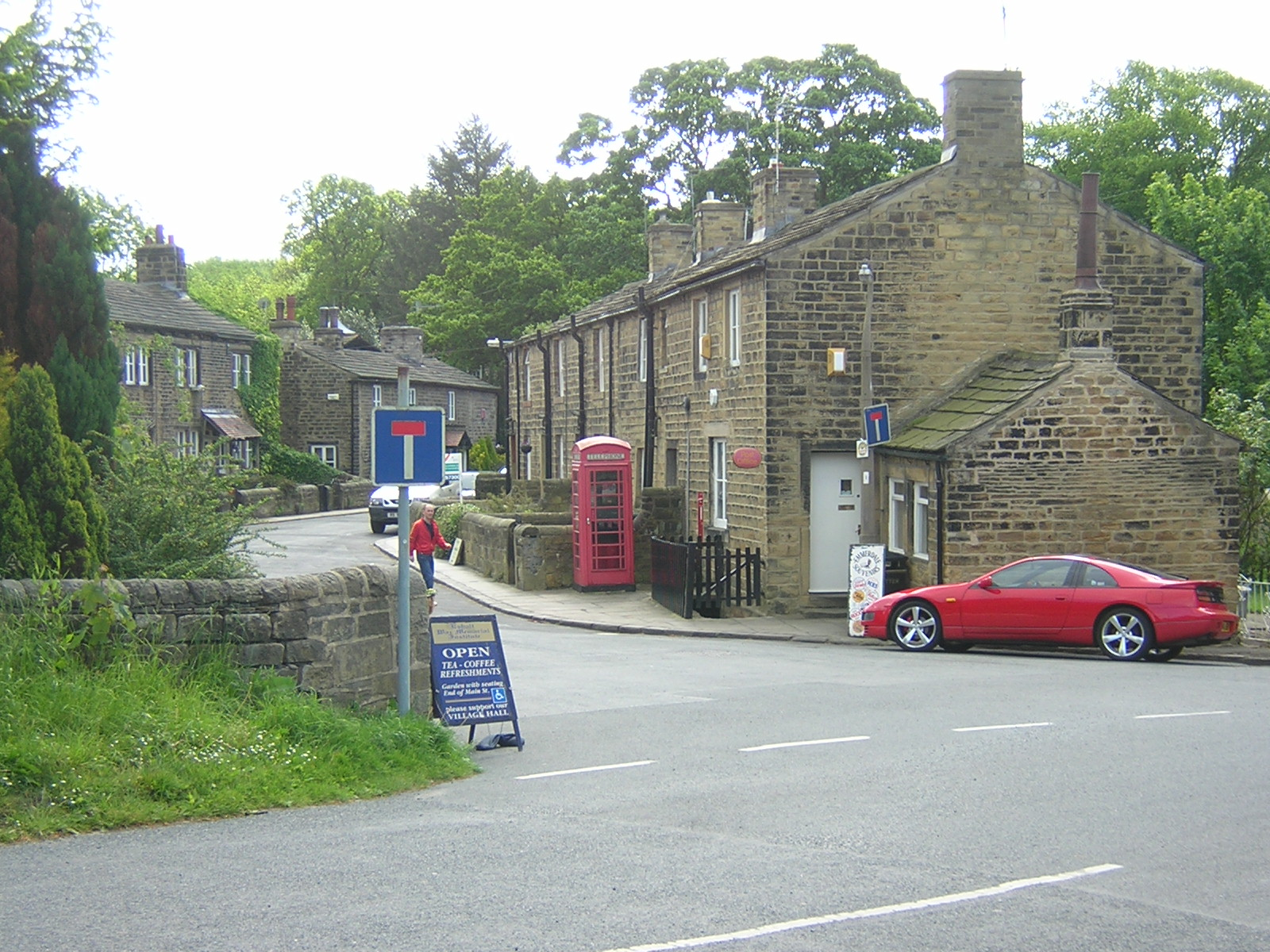
- Esholt, looking along Main Street

- Location within West Yorkshire
- Population: 1,495
- OS grid reference: SE185405
- Metropolitan borough: City of Bradford
- Metropolitan county: West Yorkshire
- Region: Yorkshire and the Humber
- Country: England
- Sovereign state: United Kingdom
- Post town: SHIPLEY
- Postcode district: BD17
- Dialling code: 01274
- Police: West Yorkshire
- Fire: West Yorkshire
- Ambulance: Yorkshire
- UK Parliament: Shipley

Esholt is a village and former civil parish in the metropolitan district of the City of Bradford, West Yorkshire, England. It is situated 3 miles (4.8 km) east of Shipley town centre, 1.5 miles (2.4 km) south-west of the A65 in Guiseley, 7 miles (11 km) north of Bradford City Centre, and 10 miles (16 km) north-west of Millennium Square, Leeds.

The name "Esholt" indicates that the village was first established in a heavily wooded area of ash trees.

== History ==
In the 12th century, the Esholt estate was owned by Syningthwaite Priory, and Esholt Priory, a Cistercian nunnery dedicated to St Mary and St Leonard was established at Lower Esholt. When the nunnery was dissolved in about 1547, the estate was granted to Henry Thompson by Edward VI. In the 17th century Frances Thompson, the heiress of Henry Thompson, married Walter Calverley (1629–1694). In 1709 their son Walter Calverley built Esholt Hall, a Queen Anne style mansion house, on the site of the old nunnery. In 1775 the Calverleys sold the estate to Robert Stansfield, whose family remained in possession until 1906, when it was sold to Bradford City Council.

To the north of the village was Esholt railway station, which opened in 1876 and closed in 1940. In 1892 a rail crash occurred at Esholt Junction on the Otley and Ilkley Joint Railway.

From 1912 to 1915 Nanson, Barker & Co manufactured the Tiny cyclecar in Esholt. In 1919 after the First World War the company made larger cars under the Airedale brand but went into liquidation in 1924.

Just before the First World War land on the estate was used for Airedale Aerodrome. The current owner of the estate, Yorkshire Water, operates a waste water treatment plant on what was the location of the aerodrome. Home farm on the estate is used as a conference and staff learning centre and many buildings have Grade II star listed building status.

=== Civil parish ===
Esholt was formerly a township and chapelry in the parish of Otley. From 1866 Esholt was a civil parish in its own right. In 1931 the parish had a population of 496. On 1 April 1937 the parish was abolished, with most of the area, including the village itself, being added to the parish of Idle in the County Borough of Bradford, with smaller parts going to Aireborough and Baildon. Since 1937 the village has been administratively part of Bradford, although it remains outside the built-up area of the city.

== Landmarks ==
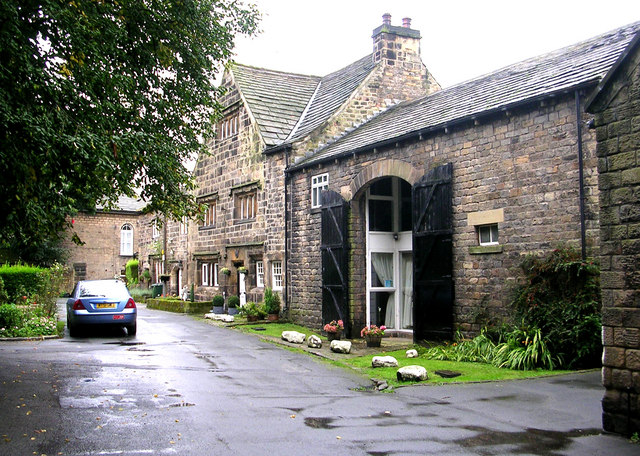
Esholt Old Hall, Church Lane

The manor house, Esholt Old Hall at Upper Esholt is medieval in origin, probably 16th century, and possibly once had a moat. It is well-preserved and has Grade II* listed building status.

Esholt has one public house, The Woolpack a listed building in Main Street.

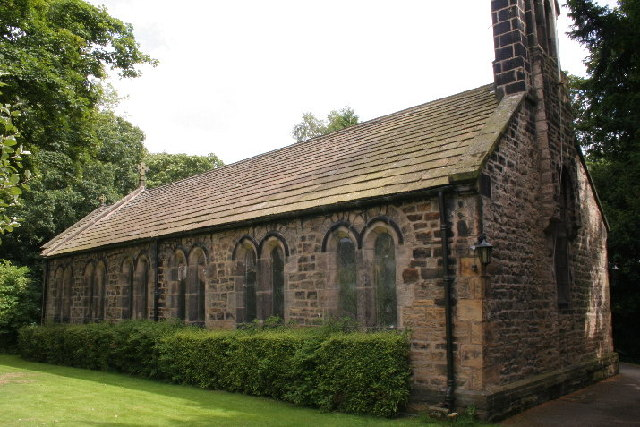
St. Paul's Church which is a listed building

The Church of Saint Paul was built at a cost of £800 in 1839 by William Rookes Crompton-Stansfield for use as a private family chapel. Historically part of the parish of Guiseley, the Church of St Paul is a successor to the private chapel in the old manor house. It was consecrated in 1853 and the chancel added in 1895. Since 1983 it has been in the combined parish of Guiseley with Esholt.

There are many listed buildings on Esholt Lane, Cunliffe Lane, Chapel Lane, Church Lane, Main Street, St Leonard's Farm, Upper Esholt, The Avenue, and Esholt Hall.

=== Esholt Waste Water Treatment Works ===
Esholt Waste Water Treatment Works is located on a 300 acres (120 ha) site on the former estate of Esholt Hall, and serves 750,000 people in Bradford and North Leeds. It is Yorkshire Water's second largest waste water treatment plant, exceeded only by Knostrop in Leeds.

==== History ====
As Bradford's population and the textile industry grew in the early 19th century most human waste and industrial effluent drained into Bradford Beck, to the canal basin and on to the River Aire flowing past Esholt.

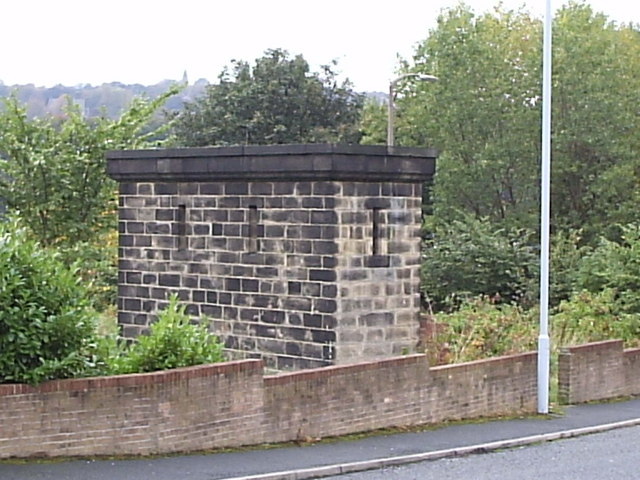
Frizinghall ventilation shaft

In 1862 a sewage system was begun in Bradford but Bradford Beck was still polluted. In 1869 William Stansfield of Esholt Hall obtained an injunction requiring Bradford Corporation to improve the sewage system so as not to pollute the beck. Bradford Corporation built a treatment works at Frizinghall to treat sewage before the water was put in the river.

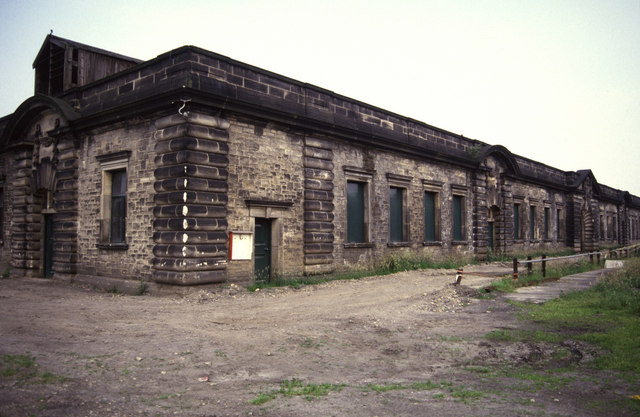
Press House, Esholt

When Frizinghall works could not cope with the waste the Esholt estate was acquired for more than £239,000 as the site for a new sewage works. A three-mile long tunnel between Frizinghall and Esholt to connect the sites was completed in the 1920s. Frizinghall works closed in 1926. The tunnel has ventilation shafts in Frizinghall, Wrose and Idle.

In the site's Sludge Disposal Building later known as the Press House, 128 steam filter presses compressed sludge to recover grease (lanolin) which could be used for a variety of applications, and the press residue was sold as fertiliser to meet the cost of operating the plant. After Bradford's woollen textile industry declined, the Press House became roofless and derelict.

==== Modernisation ====
Between 2006 and 2009 the waste water treatment plant was modernised. The £44m scheme included the installation of aeration tanks, activated sludge tanks, and sludge digestion facilities. The sludge digestion facility produces biogas that is used in a combined heat and power plant with two CHP engines generating 19 MWh per day which is 44% of the electrical energy requirements of the site. Waste products from the works are reprocessed, mixed with green waste and turned into compost. The old percolating filters are obsolete and there are plans to empty them and install photovoltaic panels to generate electricity to power the site, with any excess going to the National Grid.

==== Hydro-electricity power generation ====
The effluent emerging from the sewage tunnel passes through motorised screens, then through the 64 tonne Spaans Babcock screw generators into the primary settling tanks. The screw generators comprise two 2.6 metres (8.5 ft) diameter, 14 metres (46 ft) long Archimedes' screw hydro-turbine generators installed in series. The generators operate on a head of 8.2 metres (27 ft) with a flow rate up to 2,678 litres per second, generating up to 175 kW, providing 7% of the electrical power required by equipment on the site. The equipment was installed in 2009 by JN Bentley and is the first site in the UK to use untreated (screened) sewage for hydro power generation.

== Sport ==
Esholt Cricket Club is based at Upper Mill Cottages on Esholt Lane. Also on Esholt Lane is a golf driving range, and near Hollins Hall Hotel is an 18-hole golf course.

== Transport ==
The 649 bus service to Shipley starts in Esholt. The A3 to Leeds Bradford Airport and Bradford Interchange stops near Esholt. The nearest railway stations are at Baildon, Shipley, Guiseley and Apperley Bridge on the Wharfedale line.

== Popular culture ==
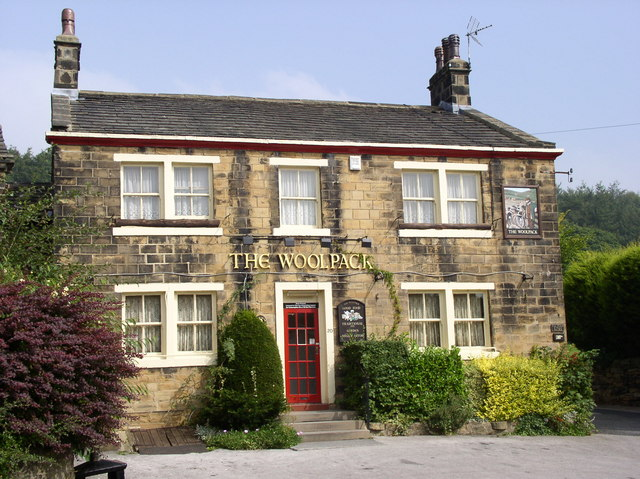
The Woolpack, Main Street

From 1976 to 1996 Esholt was used for outside location shots for the Yorkshire Television drama series Emmerdale Farm. The series relocated to a purpose-built set based on the layout of Esholt on the Harewood estate in Leeds.

During the time when the village was used as a location, the name of the village pub was changed from The Commercial Inn to The Woolpack when the landlord tired of the inconvenience caused by the frequent pub sign changes.

Scenes were once again filmed in Esholt, 19 years after they were last filmed, as part of the special episode following Ashley Thomas's dementia storyline in December 2016 in an attempt to show a skewed, unfamiliar view of the village as perceived by Ashley.

== Notable people ==
Sir Walter Calverley (1670–1749) lived at Esholt Hall which he had built in 1706–7. His son Sir Walter Calverley-Blackett (1707–77) lived at Esholt Hall before his marriage and until it sale in 1755. The estate was later owned by the MP William Crompton-Stansfield (1790–1871).

The mill owner Sir Henry Mitchell (1824–1898) was born in Esholt and received a knighthood for his support and service to education in Bradford.

== See also ==
- Listed buildings in Baildon
- Esholt Sewage Works Railway
