= Solar (room) =

Private, upper storey room in great houses or castles

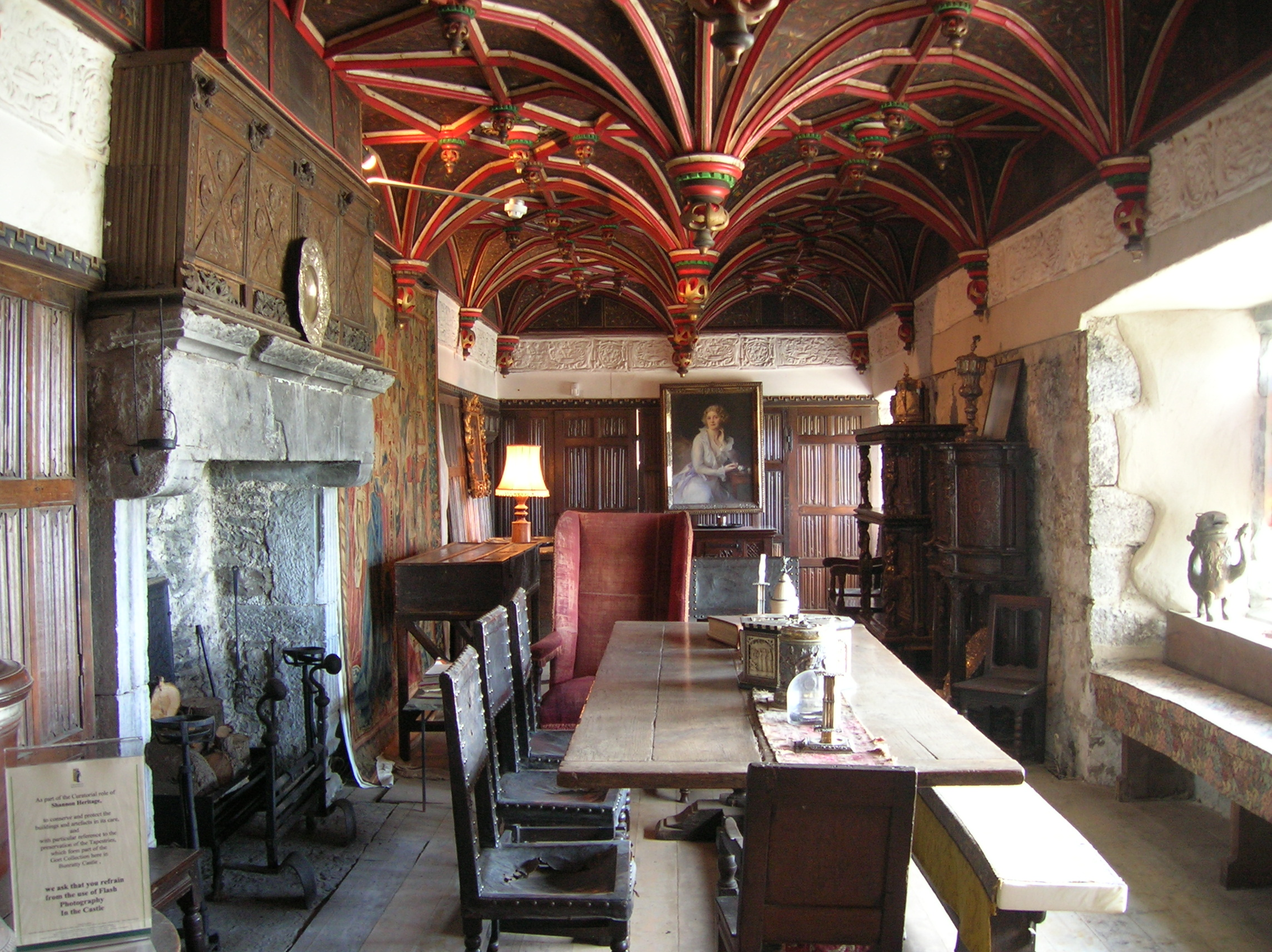
South Solar of Bunratty Castle in County Clare, Ireland

The solar was a room in many English and French medieval manor houses, great houses and castles, mostly on an upper storey, designed as the family's private living and sleeping quarters. Within castles they are often called the "Lords' and Ladies' Chamber" or the "Great Chamber".

== Etymology ==
The word solar has two possible origins: it may derive from the Latin word solaris meaning sun (often a room with the brightest aspect), or — as the solar provided privacy for its occupants — it may come from the Latin word, solus, meaning, "alone".

== Function ==
In some houses, the main ground-floor room was known as the Great Hall, in which all members of the household, including tenants, employees, and servants, would often or could sometimes eat. Those of highest status would be at the end, often on a raised dais, and those of lesser status seated further down the hall. But a need was felt for more privacy to be enjoyed by the heads of the household, encouraged by the senior women, who wanted a daytime space to talk, read and view parts of the grounds. The solar was the key inner family room, for seclusion from the hustle, bustle, noise and smell (above all from cooking) of the great hall.

The solar was generally smaller than the great hall as it was not expected to house so many people. It was a room of comfort and status, and usually included a fireplace and often decorative woodwork or tapestries/wall hangings.

The solar was almost ubiquitous among late castles across the British Isles, such as Broughton Castle, in Oxfordshire, and Stokesay Castle in Shropshire. In the medieval house of Great Dixter, in East Sussex, the solar is the uppermost room. It currently consists of three rooms and a late 15th century fireplace after being restored and remodelled by architect Edwin Lutyens. In Windsor Castle its walls are painted green with gold stars.

In manor houses of Normandy and northern France, the solar was sometimes a separate tower or pavilion, away from the great hall to provide more privacy to the lord and his family.

The possibly related term grianán (from Irish grian, "the sun"; often anglicised as "greenawn") was used in medieval Ireland for a sunny parlour or reception room. By extension it was used to refer to any summer palace or noble house.

== Paradigm examples ==
In England from north to south:

- Edlingham Castle in Northumberland, castle in ruins but solar tower is mostly intact.
- Calverley Old Hall in West Yorkshire has a solar, now converted to holiday accommodation.
- Tattershall Castle, Lincolnshire, has hall and large solar block later converted into a tower.
- Longthorpe Tower, Peterborough, an extension to an existing fortified manor house.
- Beverston Castle near Tetbury, dating from the 13th century, has a surviving but ruined solar in the south tower of the west range, with a vaulted undercroft below.
- Highclere Castle near Newbury—the suite of rooms used by the owning family is shown in the television serial Downton Abbey, but the house is post-medieval.
- Great Dixter, in Northiam — home of the late British gardener and author Christopher Lloyd, has a recreated solar.

== See also ==
- Parlour
- Drawing room (withdrawing room)
