= Calverley =

Village in West Yorkshire, England

Coordinates: 53.8266°N 1.6908°W

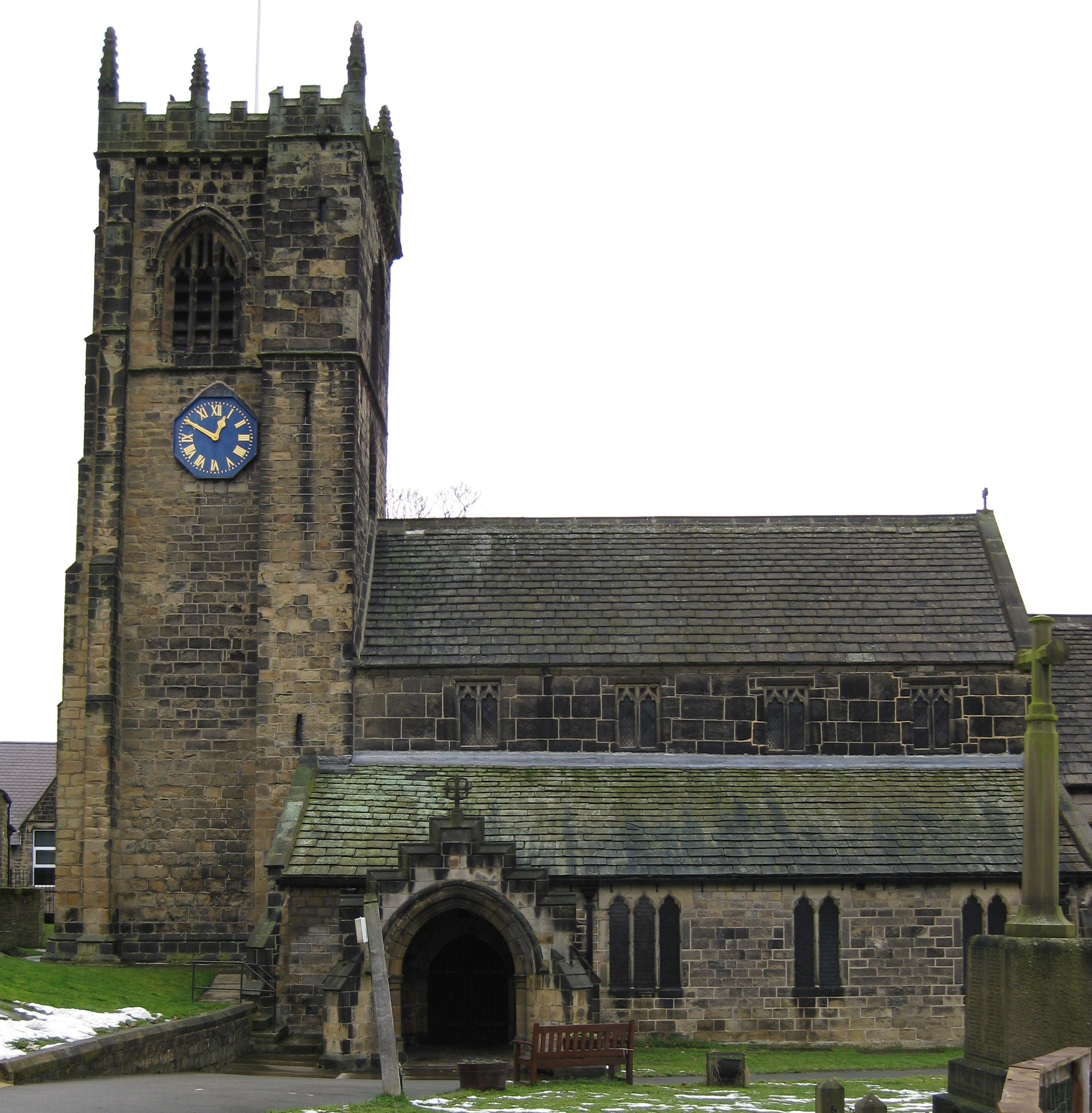
- Calverley Parish Church

- Location within West Yorkshire
- Population: 4,328 (2011 census)
- OS grid reference: SE209368
  - London: 170 mi (270 km) SSE
- Metropolitan borough: City of Leeds
- Metropolitan county: West Yorkshire
- Region: Yorkshire and the Humber
- Country: England
- Sovereign state: United Kingdom
- Post town: PUDSEY
- Postcode district: LS28
- Dialling code: 0113
- Police: West Yorkshire
- Fire: West Yorkshire
- Ambulance: Yorkshire
- UK Parliament: Leeds West and Pudsey

Calverley is a village in the City of Leeds metropolitan borough in West Yorkshire, England, on the A657 road, about ten miles (16 km) from Leeds city centre and four miles (7 km) from Bradford, and lying north of the town of Pudsey. The population of Calverley in 2011 was 4,328. It is part of the City's Calverley and Farsley ward, with a population of 22,594 at the 2011 census.

== Etymology ==
The name of Calverley is first attested in the 1086 Domesday Book, as Caverlei and Caverleia. Spellings including the l, such as Kalverlay, are found in twelfth-century sources. The name comes from the Old English words calfra, the genitive plural of calf ('calf'), and lēah ('open ground in woodland'). Thus the name once meant "calves' clearing" or something similar.

== History ==
Calverley is a rural village with a medieval manor house, Calverley Old Hall, which dates back to the 14th century and was home to the Calverley family. In 1605 the landowner, Walter Calverley, went insane and murdered some of his children in Calverley Hall. He refused to plead and was ordered to be pressed to death, a method used to try to force a confession. He died without confessing his crime in order to ensure that his estate was not taken from his remaining family.

Houses in the village are mostly constructed of sandstone, darkened by the soot of the Industrial Revolution, though there are brick buildings to the south of the original village. The Anglican parish church St Wilfrid's has parts dating from the 11th or 12th century. The tower was added and increased in the 13th to 15th century. The Methodist church beside Victoria Park opened in 1872. Both churches are Grade II listed buildings.

Calverley Cutting, a straight road which was intended to replace the old winding packhorse way through the woods between Carr Road in Calverley and Apperley Bridge, was cut through the local sandstone rock by 1856. It was meant to be part of a scheme to develop the area for luxurious residential purposes which, however, failed. Local residents objected to the closure of the old route because the new road proved to be very steep.

Calverley and Rodley railway station on the line of the former Leeds and Bradford Railway was opened in 1846, closed to passengers in 1965 and to freight in 1968.

In 1931 the parish had a population of 3655.

== Governance ==
Historically, Calverley was an ecclesiastical parish in the district of Bradford and the Morley wapentake. In 1894 Calverley Urban District was formed and on 1 April 1937 it was abolished and merged into the Municipal Borough of Pudsey, where it remained until its abolition in 1974. Both Pudsey and Farsley were part of the Calverley parish.

== Sports and recreation ==
The recreation ground in Victoria Park is home to Calverley St Wilfrid's Cricket Club. There are two golf courses to the south of the village: Woodhall Hills (established 1905) off Woodhall Road, and Calverley Golf Club off Woodhall Lane.

== Notable people ==
- Alfred Blunt, former Bishop of Bradford, is buried in the parish churchyard
- Frederick William Faber, priest, theologian and hymnographer
- Sir Percival Hartley, biochemist
- Charles Smith, cricketer
- Ann Husler, local 19th century stone merchant

== Gallery ==
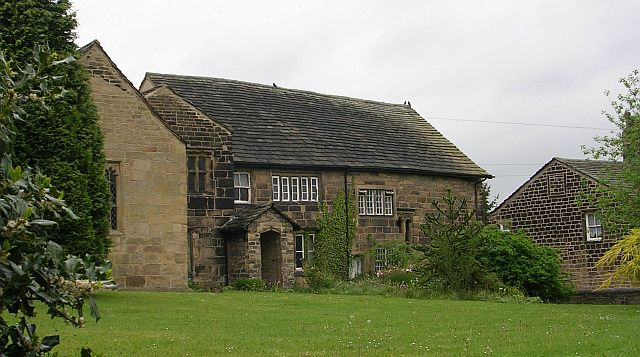
Calverley Old Hall

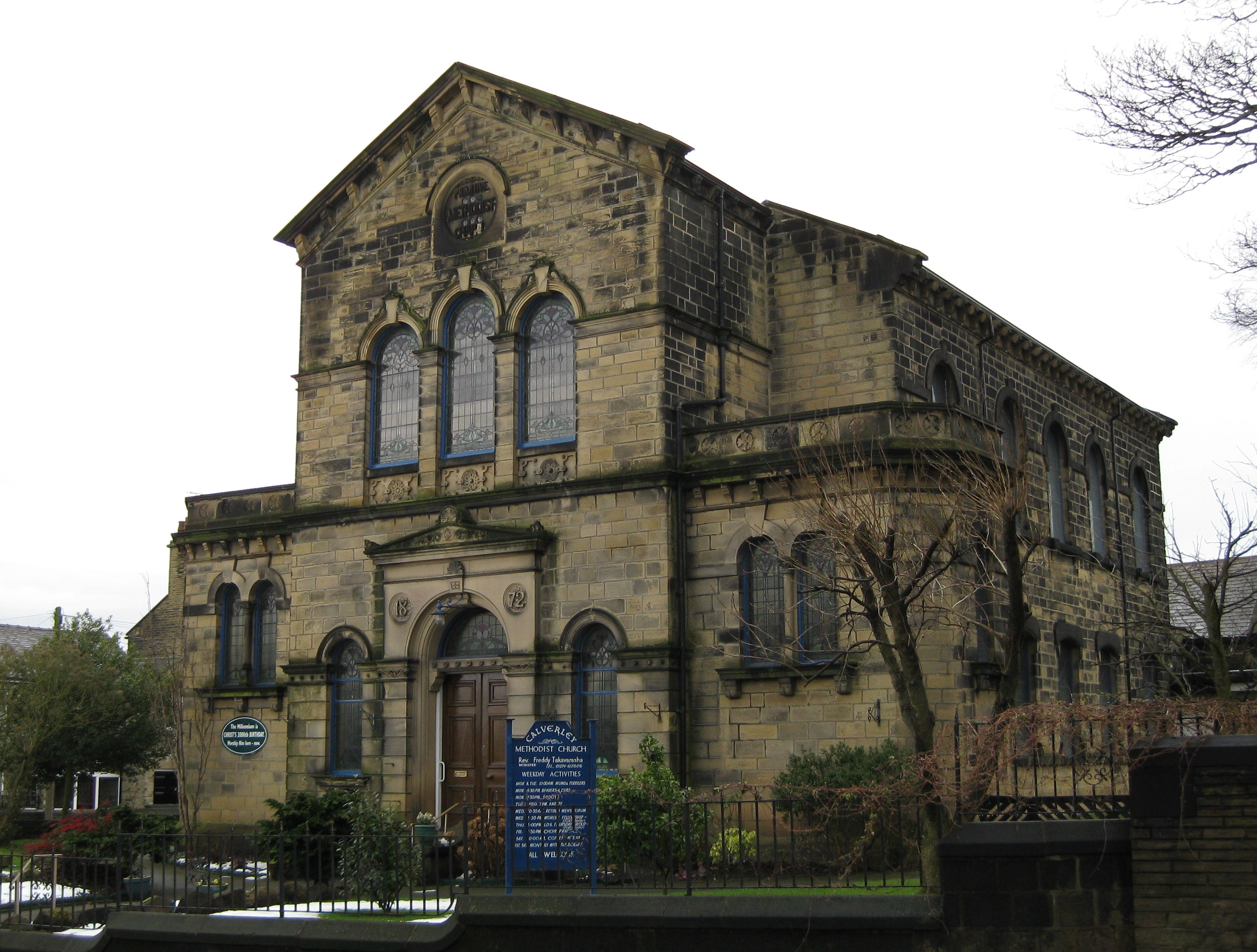
Methodist Church (1872)

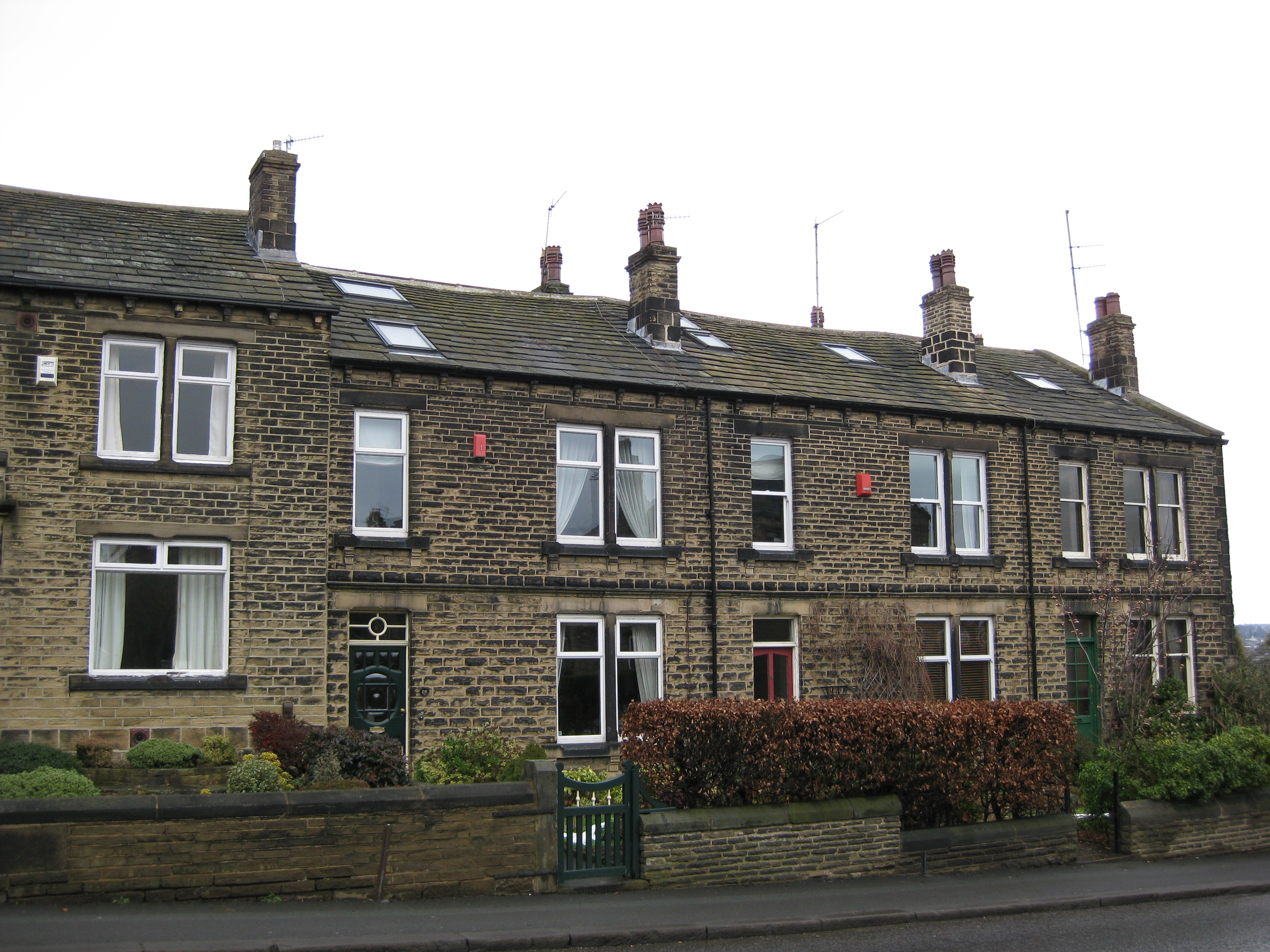
Older Calverley Houses

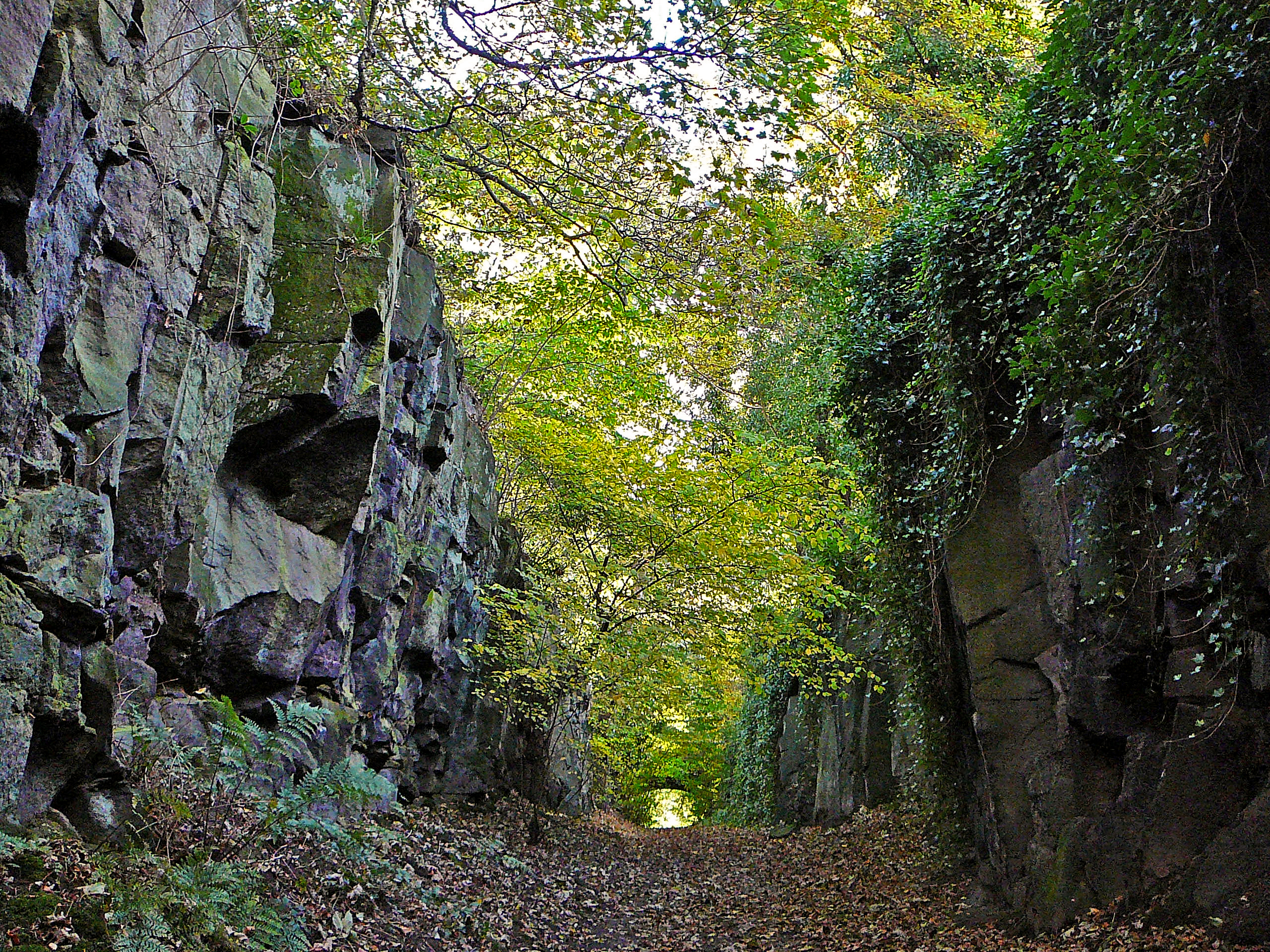
Calverley Cutting, with the bridge of Clara Drive in the background

== See also ==
- Listed buildings in Calverley and Farsley
