= Gawn Grainger =

Scottish actor (1937–2025)

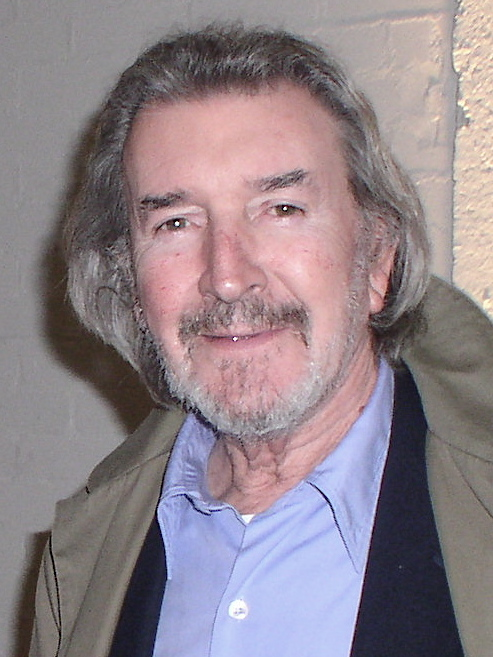
- Grainger in 2009
- Born: 12 October 1937; Glasgow, Scotland
- Died: 17 May 2025 (aged 87)
- Occupation: Actor
- Years active: 1952–2025
- Spouses: Janet McIntire (m. 1963; div. 1967) Janet Key (m. 1970; died 1992) Zoë Wanamaker (m. 1994)
- Children: 2

Gawn Grainger (12 October 1937 – 17 May 2025) was a Scottish actor, playwright and screenwriter.

== Early life ==
Some sources indicate he was born in Glasgow, Scotland on 12 October 1937. He was the son of Charles Neil Grainger and his wife Elizabeth (née Gall). Educated at Westminster City School in Victoria, London, he later trained for the stage at the Italia Conti Academy of Theatre Arts.

Grainger made his first London appearance as a boy in 1949, when he played in Where the Rainbow Ends, opposite Anton Dolin, at the Comedy Theatre, London.

== Career ==
Grainger began his professional career at the Dundee Rep in 1961, followed by two years at Ipswich, 1962–64 where he made his debut in pantomime by playing the Dame in Aladdin in 1962. While in Ipswich, he also played "The Corporal" in"The Amorous Prawn". He toured North America with the Bristol Old Vic company in 1967, playing Romeo opposite Jane Asher’s Juliet. He joined Laurence Olivier's National Theatre at the Old Vic company in 1972.

Among his notable television credits were the Apostle Andrew in Son of Man by Dennis Potter (1969); the Earl of Kildare in The Shadow of the Tower (1972); Dr. Pearson in Strangers and Brothers (1984); George Stephenson in the Doctor Who serial The Mark of the Rani (1985) and Lesley Flux in Midsomer Murders episode The House in the Woods (2005). He was an occasional panelist on the syndicated, New York-based What's My Line? series in 1968, 1969 and 1970.

== Writer ==
Grainger authored the following plays: Four to One (1976), Vamp Till Ready (1978), Lies in Plastic Smiles (1979) and Paradise Lost (1980).

In 1986 Four to One was televised by BBC Scotland, starring Mark McManus, Trevor Ray, Derek Newark and Derrick O'Connor.

In the 1980s, he also wrote several scripts for Geoff McQueen's BBC1 drama series Big Deal starring Ray Brooks.

== Donmar Warehouse 2012 ==
From February to April 2012 Grainger performed as Mr Balance in The Recruiting Officer, the 1706 late Restoration Comedy by Irish playwright, George Farquhar. It was the highly acclaimed first production for incoming artistic director Josie Rourke at The Donmar Warehouse in London. As a result of the particular interest generated in Grainger's life over the course of the production, Mark Gatiss, his fellow cast member, instigated a Platform event which took place before the evening performance of The Recruiting Officer on 11 April.

During the discussion, Grainger confirmed some little known facts about his life and told anecdotes about his career over sixty years as both actor and playwright in the UK and US. Joking with Gatiss about some confusion around the date and place of his birth, he commented that he appeared to have been born twice, in 1937 in Glasgow and in 1940 in Northern Ireland. He admitted that the latter had been a twist on a then more romantic notion of theatrical heritage. It was at this point that Grainger also revealed that he learned that his biological father had in fact been his parents' lodger who later went on to marry his mother. He expressed gratitude to his father for bringing him along as a small boy to theatrical events which he humorously described and which had a positive effect on his imagination and determination to engage with performance. He began writing for the stage prior to his professional acting debut, having his first play performed at the age of twenty-one. Following a distinguished acting career, most particularly at the National Theatre in London, Grainger worked on writing projects in the 1980s whilst his children grew up. He returned to acting in the 1990s at the insistence of Harold Pinter, who, when asked by Grainger, "why should I return to acting?", replied, "because you owe it to yourself".

== Personal life and death ==
His second marriage was to the actress Janet Key in 1970. Together they had two children. Their marriage lasted until Key's death from cancer in July 1992. His third marriage was to American-British actress Zoë Wanamaker, to whom he was married from November 1994 until his death.

Grainger was a close friend of Laurence Olivier and his family, and helped the actor write his second book On Acting (1986).

Grainger died on 17 May 2025, at the age of 87.

== Theatre career ==
- Stage debut as the Boy King in King's Rhapsody, Palace Theatre, 1950
- Professional debut: Dundee Rep, 1961; Ipswich 1962–64; and Bristol Old Vic, 1964–66
- Bristol Old Vic, parts included: Title role in Kean; Christy Mahon in The Playboy of the Western World, Romeo, Laertes in Hamlet and Claudio in Measure for Measure
- Toured the world in the last three roles, making his New York debut as Romeo in Romeo and Juliet at the City Center Theatre, February 1967
- Jimmy in There's a Girl in My Soup, Music Box, New York, October 1967
- Cyril Bishop in The Giveaway, Garrick Theatre, London, April 1969
- James Boswell in The Douglas Cause, Duke of York's, November 1971
- McCue in The Front Page, National Theatre at the Old Vic, July 1972
- Macduff in Macbeth, National Theatre, November 1972
- Oronte in The Misanthrope, National Theatre, February 1973
- Officer in The Bacchae, National Theatre, August 1973
- Roberto in Saturday, Sunday, Monday, National Theatre, October 1973
- Jeremy Haynes in The Party, National Theatre, December 1973
- Stephen Lloyd in Next of Kin, National Theatre, May 1974
- Figaro in The Marriage of Figaro (play), National Theatre, July 1974
- Toured the US as Oronte in the NT production of The Misanthrope, 1975, appearing at the St James Theater NY, March 1975
- Osric in Hamlet, National Theatre at the Old Vic, December 1975, and NT Lyttelton, March 1976
- Took part in Tribute to a Lady, Old Vic, February 1976
- Usumcasane in Tamburlaine the Great, NT Olivier, October 1976 and May 1977
- Juggler in Force of Habit, NT, November 1976
- Casca in Julius Caesar, NT, March 1977
- Soldier in The Passion, NT, April 1977
- To Those Born Later, NT, June 1977
- Corporal Stoddard in The Plough and the Stars, NT, September 1977
- Mr Dorilant in The Country Wife, NT, November 1977
- Schoolmaster in Brand, NT, April 1978
- Ajax in The Woman, NT, August 1978
- Charles I in The World Turned Upside Down, NT, November 1978
- Wesley in Has 'Washington' Legs?, NT, November 1978
- Jack/Nick in The Long Voyage Home, NT, February 1979
- George/General Heller in Dispatches, NT, June 1979
- Doctor/Squire/Landlord/Rector in Lark Rise and Sir Timothy in Candleford, NT Cottesloe, October and November 1979
- Jimmy Tomorrow in The Iceman Cometh, NT, 1980
- Reverend Hale in The Crucible, NT at the Comedy Theatre, March 1981
- Knight The Passion, NT international tour, 1981
- Party Time and Mountain Language, Almeida Theatre, November 1991
- No Man's Land, Almeida. November 1992; Comedy Theatre, February 1993
- A Month in the Country, Albery, March 1994
- Taking Sides, Minerva, Chichester, May 1995; Criterion, July 1995
- Fool for Love, Donmar Warehouse, October 1996
- Wishbones, Bush, June 1997
- Mutabilitte, NT Cottesloe, November 1997
- Garret Fitzmaurice in Give Me Your Answer Do, Hampstead, March 1998; Gramercy Theatre, NY, October 1999
- Tales from Hollywood, Donmar Warehouse, May 2001
- Sing Yer Heart Out for the Lads, NT Lyttelton Loft, May 2002; NT Cottesloe, April 2004
- Absolutely (Perhaps), Wyndham's, October 2003
- The Seagull, NT Lyttelton, June 2006
- Frank in Amy's View, Garrick, November 2006
- You Can't Take It With You, Southwark Playhouse, October 2007
- Saint Matthew/Caliphas the Elder, The Last Days of Judas Iscariot, Almeida, April 2008
- Robbie in "Really Old, Like Forty Five", The National Theatre, London, January 2010
- Costa in "Onassis", Derby Theatre & Novello Theatre, 2010
- A Woman Killed With Kindness, NT Lyttelton, July 2011
- The Recruiting Officer, Donmar Warehouse, 2012
- Don Juan's father in "Don Juan in Soho", Wyndham Theatre, 2017
