= The History of the Nun =

The History of the Nun, or The Fair Vow Breaker, is a novella by Aphra Behn published in 1689. It is a piece of amatory fiction.

Some of the story's main themes include woman's desire, guilt, and reputation. A specific example of certain themes are shown throughout the novella as Isabella's desire to uphold society's expectations of being a virtuous woman, her love for Henualt after breaking her vows, but also for her desire to get away with murder and to maintain her reputation. The book, and Aphra Behn as a female writer, inspired many other writers to use amatory fiction as a way to write about women.

It contains an introduction which may suggest a romantic affair between the author and Hortense Mancini, niece of Cardinal Mazarin, one of the mistresses of Charles II and "adventuresses" of the 17th century.

== Plot ==
The main character, Isabella, is the daughter of Count Henrick de Vallary of Iper (Ypres). After the count's wife dies, he sends his daughter to a nunnery run by her Reverend aunt, Lady Abbess, with the provision that she will decide for herself whether she wants to become a nun when she turns thirteen. Despite the success of her debut, aided by her genius, piety, and beauty, Isabella turns down the lavish lifestyle she could have as the wife of a wealthy man for the life of a nun. However, she had won many suitors during her short debut, and one, in particular, is eighteen-year-old Villenoys. He alone of all her admirers possessed the courage to confess his feelings, but when she turns him down, he falls deathly ill. Though he does recover, his feelings remain as he heads off to war.

A nun named Sister Katteriena arrives at the nunnery. She is Isabella's bed-companion and closest friend. She has a brother named Arnaldo Henault, who loves his sister dearly and comes to visit her almost every day at the nunnery gate. Isabella comes along with Katteriena and, after some time, falls in love with him. She makes the decision to flee the nunnery with him, thereby breaking her vows. As she flees, she also steals from the nunnery. As a result, Henault's father disowns him. They both secure pardons through the aid of Isabella's aunt, but they struggle on their own in the country, failing at farming and living in poverty. To win the favor of his father, Henault joins the army, where he meets Villenoys. After a particularly disastrous military loss, Henault is presumed dead. As Villenoys returns to console his widow, he also seizes the opportunity to win Isabella's hand, whom he still loves exceedingly. Impoverished, deprived of her husband, and unwilling to return to the nunnery, Isabella agrees to marry Villenoys, but asks him to wait three years before they marry so she may grieve for Henault. After the three years, they marry and Isabella lives the lavish lifestyle her father first told her she could have when she made her debut.

Seven years later, Henault escapes his enslavement and returns home to Isabella. He explains what happened to him, and she confesses that she has married Villenoys. She then offers him a bed in which to sleep but later suffocates him with a pillow while he sleeps, fearing that she will be shamed for having committed bigamy. Sometime after her crime, Villenoys, who was out visiting a friend, returns home. She tells him that Henault has returned but lies about her crime, saying that Henault merely died of grief after discovering that she has remarried. Villenoys decides to throw Henault's body into the river and proclaims that he will do it himself, for love of her. However, to save herself from future reproach from him, Isabella sews the canvas bag into which the body was placed to Villenoys' collar so that he will be dragged along with the body when he throws it into the water. Her plot works, and the two bodies wash up on shore some days later. Authorities identify them as Villenoys and some unknown stranger. When they bring Villenoys' corpse to Isabella, its eyes mysteriously open, and she faints. However, due to her reputation for piety, no one suspects her. The whole affair might have remained a secret were it not for the arrival of a French gentleman, who knew Henault from the war and identifies his corpse. Upon this new discovery, authorities question Isabella, who confesses immediately. She is executed, but before she dies she gives an empowered speech about the importance of keeping one's vows, thus conquering everyone's hearts with her beauty and wisdom to the very end.

== Characters ==
Narrator: Showcases views, allowing the reader to have more of an insight on how the narrator may feel about a situation or a character.

Isabella: Main character who is seen throughout the novella as a lady of virtue. After her mother's death she goes to a nunnery where eventually her vow is broken due to the love of a man.

Henault: Katteriena's brother who wins Isabella's heart, breaking her vows, and becomes her first husband.

Villenoys: Isabella's first admirer and best friend of Henault; he eventually becomes Isabella's second husband after the presumed death of Henault.

Sister Katteriena: Isabella's best friend and roommate in the nunnery, also sister to Henault.

Henrick de Vallary: Isabella's father

Lady Abbess: Aunt of Isabella, who had a hand in her becoming a nun. She is also largely concerned about social demands of that century, specifically with Isabella's title.

French Gentleman: Fellow slave who escaped with Henault, who was able to connect the dots to the mysterious murder so that Isabella was able to be condemned to be beheaded.

== Themes ==
- Woman's desire
  - Isabella's desire for Henault causes her to break her monastic vows so that she can be with him
- Virtue
  - Isabella constantly questions her own morals and what is "most evil" as in sin, and what is not a sin
- Betrayal
  - Isabella killing her first and second husband
- Social demands
  - By Isabella questioning her vows she shows her need for maintaining her appearance in society

== Wider context ==
The History of the Nun belongs to the genre of amatory fiction. Amatory fiction is mainly written by women and has a focus on sexual love and romance, as well as the story as a whole being a little more dramatic rather than realistic. Common themes in amatory fiction include female-centered stories, gender inversion, and the use of masquerade or disguises. Amatory fiction also explores issues of power, social convention, behavior reputation and gender identity.

The book Representing Women and Female Desire from Arcadia to Jane Eyre says that the genre of "amatory" in the 17th century allowed for women writers to not only write about romance, but also "through narrative and fictional characters" to enter public discourse. Prior to the creation of the genre many works by women were circulated through manuscript.

== Reception ==
The History of the Nun was popular with contemporary audiences, and it was adapted at least five times between 1694 and 1757. The three best-known adaptations are The Fatal Marriage: or, the Innocent Adultery, by Thomas Southerne (1694); Isabella, or, the Fatal Marriage, by David Garrick (1757); and 'Philinda's Story out of the Book' in The Lining of the Patch-Work Screen, by Jane Barker (1726).

The History of the Nun, or The Fair Vow Breaker, is a piece whose title speaks for itself, but why a nun? Some critical reviewers such as Susan Goulding argue that Behn's use of nuns also serves as a gateway into the "history of feminist thought." Many critics look deep into the subcontext of Behn's use of nun. Although Isabella murders both her husbands, the narrator suggests that this would have all been avoided had Isabella not been led by others to make a monastic vow when she was still too young to understand its implications. Elizabeth Matthews calls Isabella 'a vulnerable body caught in the trap of her life', and suggests that Behn predominantly depicted her as an agonized victim who tries but fails to escape her dark fate.

Behn, as a 17th-century woman writer, in today's modern world is analyzed rather than ridiculed for her writing. During that time period, women's writing was not dignified, nor was it often acknowledged. Although she was well known for her groundbreaking career, the Restoration circle she was part of mostly preferably allowed license to male writers. The Restoration circle expected women to stay silent and not express their own desire. Her works expressed her need and desire for freedom. The genre of amatory fiction that Behn writes in allows for women of her century to write and read about love and desire through a public narrative.

The Fair Jilt is another example of Behn's work that is comparable and somewhat continues the style and themes of her work through another story.

== Further reading/sources ==
- Craft, Catherine A."Reworking Male Models: Aphra Behn's 'Fair Vow-Breaker', Eliza Haywood's 'Fantomina', and Charlotte Lennox's 'Female Quixote'", Modern Language Review 86, (1991): 821–38, 825–26.
- Linker, Laura. Dangerous Women, Libertine Epicures, and the Rise of Sensibility, 1670–1730. Burlington: 2011 41–4 and 58–71
- Mathews, Elizabeth J. "'A Strange Sympathy': The Rhetoric of Emotion in The History of the Nun; or, The Fair Vow-Breaker" ABO: Interactive Journal for Women in the Arts 1640–1830 Vol. 2, no.1 (2012): 1–12, 2. doi:10.5038/2157-7129.2.1.4
- Pearson, Jacqueline. "The History of The History of the Nun", in Rereading Aphra Behn: History, Theory and Criticism, ed. Heidi Hutner. Charlottesville: 1993, 234–52.
- Saxton, Kirsten T. Narratives of Women and Murder in England 1680–1760: Deadly Plots Burlington: 2003, 32–40.
- Fowler, Joanna. "Dramatic and Narrative Techniques in the Novellas of Aphra Behn", Women's Writing 22.1 (2015): 97–113. ProQuest. Web. 24 November 2015.
- Goulding, Susan. "Aphra Behn's 'Stories of Nuns': Narrative Diversion and 'Sister Books'", Interdisciplinary Literary Studies: A Journal of Criticism and Theory 10.1 (2008): 38–55. ProQuest. Web. 24 November 2015.
- Mitchell, Marea, and Dianne Osland. Representing Women and Female Desire from Arcadia to Jane Eyre. Palgrave Macmillan, 2005. ProQuest. Web. 24 November 2015.
- Pearson, Jacqueline. "The History of the History of the Nun." Ed. Heidi Hutner.UP of Virginia, 1993. 234–252. Feminist Issues: Practice, Politics, Theory. ProQuest. Web. 13 December 2015.
