= The Town-Fopp: or, Sir Timothy Tawdrey =

Play by Aphra Behn

The Town-Fopp: or, Sir Timothy Tawdrey is a Restoration comedy written in mixed prose and verse by Aphra Behn and first staged in 1676. It deals with an unhappy marriage and its dissolution.

The play reworks George Wilkins' play The Miseries of Enforced Marriage (1607), itself based on events from the life of Walter Calverley who, as a result of Tudor wardship practice, was forced into his marriage. A heavy drinker, Calverley stabbed his wife and killed two of his children in 1605, but these crimes are not related in Wilkins' play which contrives a happy ending. In Behn's play the unhappy couple manage to dissolve their marriage and seek happiness with other partners.

== Plot ==
Bellmour is in love with Celinda, and they are secretly betrothed. However, Celinda's parents intend her to marry Sir Timothy Tawdrey, a fop. Lord Plotwell, who is Bellmour's uncle and guardian, forces him to marry Diana.

Bellmour refuses to consummate his marriage to Diana, and tells her that he cannot love her. An angry Diana tries to seduce Celinda (whilst Celinda is in male disguise). She then turns her attention to Friendlove (Celinda's brother), who agrees to kill Bellmour for her.

A despairing Bellmour falls into debauchery, and visits a bagnio with Tawdrey. They meet Betty Flauntit (Tawdrey's mistress) and other women there.

Lord Plotwell receives a letter from Diana begging for her marriage to be annulled. Diana and Bellmour's marriage is dissolved, and Plotwell reconciles with Bellmour (who has now reformed). Diana agrees to marry Friendlove, and Bellmour is now free to marry Celinda.

In a subplot, Tawdrey plots to revenge himself upon Bellmour by using a mock marriage to trick his sister (Phillis) into having sex with him. However, their 'fake' marriage ceremony in fact turns out to be fully legal.

== Reception ==
When reviewing Behn's life and works, one writer stated that 'in all her [Behn's] comedies we can remember but one true, honest lover, Belmour, in "The Town Fop"'.

Montague Summers felt that The Town Fop showed 'in a marked degree her intimate knowledge of the earlier dramatists'.
