= Agnes de Castro; or, The Force of Generous Love =

Novel authored by Jean-Baptiste de Brilhac

Agnes de Castro; or, The Force of Generous Love (also known as The History of Agnes de Castro) (French: Agnes de Castro, Nouvelle Portugaise), is a tragic novel written by Jean-Baptiste de Brilhac. An English translation by Aphra Behn was published in 1688. It dramatizes the life and murder of Inês de Castro, the lover and posthumously recognized wife of King Peter I of Portugal.

== Plot ==
The novel focuses on Constantina, Princess of Portugal; Dom Pedro, Prince of Portugal and Constantina's husband; and Agnes de Castro, who is Constantina's loving and loyal friend.

Pedro secretly adores Agnes, but Elvira (who is in love with Pedro herself) reveals this to Constantina. Meanwhile, Don Alvaro (the brother of Elvira) tries to secure Agnes's affections. Agnes tries to leave Coimbra, but Constantina and Pedro convince her to stay. Constantina, Pedro and Agnes try to preserve their friendship and love for each other, but struggle with their divided affections. Constantina dies of grief.

Alvaro, following King Afonso's advice, kidnaps Agnes. After her death, Pedro takes his revenge by embarking on a war against his father.

== Reception ==
Behn's translation was an inspiration for Catharine Trotter's tragedy of the same name, performed at the Theatre Royal in 1695 with great success.
