= Walter Calverley =

English murderer (died 1605)

Canting arms of Calverley: Argent, a fess gules between three calves passant sable

Walter Calverley (1579–1605) was an English squire from Yorkshire.

Perhaps the most infamous member of the Calverley family, he is known for murdering two of his young children, leading to his own death by pressing in 1605. His story has long been associated with two plays which were performed shortly after the events of 1605 and which were published in 1607 and 1608: The Miseries of Enforced Marriage and A Yorkshire Tragedy. These plays have strongly influenced the historic record, including his entry by Sidney Lee in the Dictionary of National Biography. Modern scholarship, based on historic legal documents and contemporary letters, provides a different picture.

In some of her letters, his mother-in-law spelled the name "Coverley", which suggests that it was then pronounced with the "al" as in "calf" (/ˈkɑːvəliː/; "Calverley" means "pasture for calves").

== The Legend ==
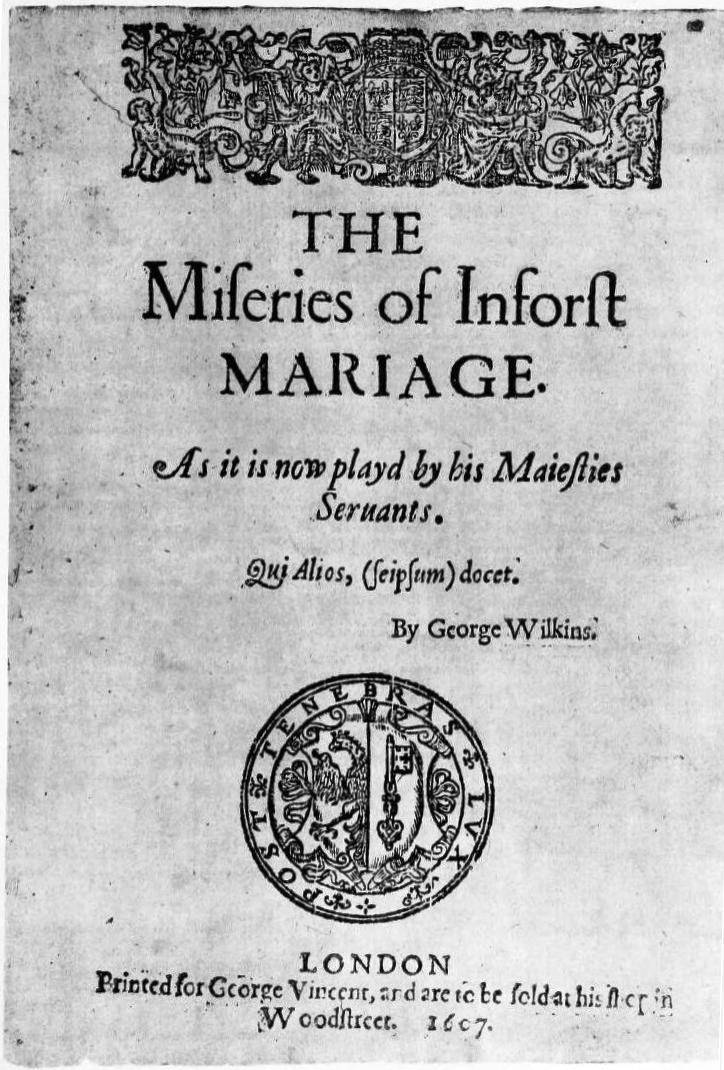
Title page of The Miseries of Inforst Mariage (1607) by George Wilkins

The conventional biography of Walter Calverley (as in the 1st edition of the Dictionary of National Biography) draws on events from the two plays and from history. Much confusion has been caused by the Calverleys' practice of alternating between "Walter" and "William" as the name of the eldest son in each generation, with the other name used for the second son. In accordance with common practice under primogeniture, the eldest son married young (often while a minor) while later sons married late.

The conventional biography does not say when Walter was born, perhaps because there is a clear problem for those, such as the DNB, which give the date − 1579 − of Walter's matriculation at Cambridge. It then goes on to record that Walter lost his father as a young child. This is consistent with Walter the matriculator having been the son of Sir William Calverley, who died c. 1572. We shall see that Walter the matriculator was probably the murderer's uncle, while Sir William was the murderer's grandfather.

In Scene 1 of A Yorkshire Tragedy, Sam says of the young master "he's married to another long ago". This theme is developed further in The Miseries of Enforced Marriage. The Calverley figure, Scarborrow, has plight his troth with Clare, the daughter of Sir John Harcop. Both parties consider the marriage binding: Scarborrow regards his subsequent marriage to Katherine as bigamous and their children as bastards; Clare commits suicide as she cannot remarry.

Under ecclesiastical law, marriage in sixteenth-century England could be contracted "per verba de præsenti" privately, with no public ceremony. Such marriages were valid in the eyes of the church, but were not recognised by the civil law. The conventional biography records that, in his teens, Walter fell in love with a local young woman and proposed marriage. She accepted, and the young couple planned to marry. We cannot know whether there is any truth to this.

In The Miseries of Enforced Marriage, Scarborrow is called to London by his uncle, Sir William, and his guardian, Lord Faulconbridge. His guardian tells Scarborrow that he is to marry the guardian's niece. In his 1816 history of Leeds and its district, Loidis and Elmete, Thomas Dunham Whitaker records that Walter travelled to London to meet his guardian, Sir William, who told him that he was to marry the guardian's niece. As Walter did marry Philippa Brooke, niece of Sir William Brooke, it is easy to see how this led to the identification of Sir William Brooke, 10th Baron Cobham as Walter's guardian.

In the conventional biography, Walter and Phillipa disliked each other. However, dutifully, the couple wed in London. Walter forgot his previous engagement. On their return to Calverley, Walter sought distraction in drinking and gambling, soon dissipating his fortune, mortgaging his lands and squandering his wife's dowry.

In A Yorkshire Tragedy, the Master of Walter's old college visits him in Yorkshire, bringing news that his brother has been arrested for a debt which is Walter's, This precipitates the murderous string of events. In the conventional biography, on 23 April 1605, news was brought to Walter that a relative, a student at Cambridge, had been arrested for a debt which was actually Walter's. In a drunken frenzy, he stabbed his sons, William and Walter, and his wife, killing both children. However, Phillipa survived the attack as Calverley's knife did not pierce his wife's corset, inlaid with bone. Calverley continued murderously through the house, throwing a nursemaid down stairs and ordering another servant to retrieve his youngest son, who was with a wet-nurse miles from home. When the servant failed to obey, Calverley saddled his horse and went off to kill his youngest child, but was apprehended and brought before the magistrate.

== Early life ==
Walter Calverley was born in April 1579 to William Calverley and his wife Katherine, daughter of John Thorneholme, Esq of Haysthorpe. The Memoirs of Sir Walter Blackett (1819) trace the history of the Calverley family from the twelfth century, when John Scot became lord of the manors of Calverley and Pudsey. Walter's great-grandfather was Sir William Calverley, High Sheriff of Yorkshire in 1539/40 and alive in 1568 (he was dead by 1575). As well as the ancestral manors of Calverley and Pudsey, Walter's father, William, held the manor of Burley in Wharfedale and lands in Bagley, Farsley, Eccleshill, Bolton in Bradfordale (now a suburb of Bradford) and Seacroft, all in Yorkshire. The Memoirs further record that

Under the influence of his wife, who was a zealous catholic, he [the murderer's father] suffered greatly in his estates on account of his recusancy

Cambridge University records show that brothers William and Walter Calverley matriculated at Clare Hall, Cambridge in 1579. William progressed to his BA in 1581–82 and received his MA in 1585. As the generations of Calverleys alternated between Walter and William for the eldest son (with the other name for the second son), the William who graduated was probably the murderer's father.

== Wardship ==
After his father's death on 1 October 1596, Walter Calverley became a ward on 25 March 1597 of his mother Katherine and his great-uncle William. That he became a ward tells us that no marriage had been contracted in writing before his father's death, as Walter would then not have been subject to wardship proceedings.

As the manors of Calverley and Pudsey were held on knight-service, Walter was a royal ward and the wardship was for sale. This was lucrative for the Crown: in effect it was a form of taxation on the gentry and upper classes. The purchaser took the income from the ward's portion (one-third) of the estate during the wardship and owned the right of marriage. If a ward failed to marry the bride nominated by his guardian, the ward had to pay the king the value of the marriage. If the ward married without consent, he remained in wardship until the king had received twice the value of the marriage.

Although the guardian was supposed only to take the income from the ward's portion of the estate while the ward was underage (under 21), unscrupulous guardians could extract value by, for instance, felling trees and selling the timber. In principle, once he reached his majority, the ward could sue his guardian for "waste", the legal term for the lessening of value of an estate; in practice they very rarely did.

On 23 June 1598 Walter's wardship passed to Lady Anne Gargrave of Nostell Priory and her son Richard Gargrave Lady Gargrave was extremely rich and had six daughters to marry off.

== Marriage ==
In the ordinary course of events, Walter would have married one of Lady Gargrave's daughters. But Lady Gargrave faced a formidable opponent. Lady Anne Cobham was another widow with daughters to marry off. Her husband had been Sir Henry Brooke, known as "Cobham", the uncle of Elizabeth Brooke, who had married Sir Robert Cecil. Along with his other roles, on 21 May 1599 Cecil succeeded his father, Lord Burghley, as Master of the Court of Wards and Liveries. This gave him an effective veto on the marriages of wards.

Lady Gargrave's riches were no match for Lady Anne's wiles and the favours she could call in. Observing that Walter had shown some interest in her daughter Philippa, Lady Anne wrote to Cecil on 30 May 1599 seeking his help in securing Walter Calverley's marriage to her daughter Philippa with a dowry less than the £1500 offered by Lady Gargrave for him to marry Lady Gargrave's daughter. This letter says that Walter would remain a ward until April 1600, implying that he was born in April 1579.

On 20 April 1600 Lady Anne wrote to Cecil again, enclosing a petition (which has now been lost) on behalf of Walter, whom she describes as "an unstayed younge man". "Unstayed" is the opposite of "staid" and could refer to his faith or (more likely) his behaviour. Calverley has married her daughter Philippa and remains a ward, so he was born between 20 April 1579 and 30 April 1579.

Lady Anne's two letters imply that the marriage took place between June 1599 and April 1600. How Lady Gargrave responded is not recorded. Until his 21st birthday, she remained in control of one-third of the Calverley estates.

== Adult life ==
At the end of April 1600, Walter Calverley reached his 21st birthday and became the head of the family. His lands were worth 800 pounds a year but before he could receive this income, he had to sue out his livery and endure primer seisin, by which the Crown took the profits of the first year of his ownership. He had seven brothers and seven sisters to provide for, including dowries for his sisters when they married. The family were staunch Catholics and so at risk for recusancy.

On 20 June 1600 his mother-in-law, Lady Anne, wrote to Cecil reporting that she had paid the dowry of £1,000 but that she now owed £500. As Walter had been a minor at his marriage, he had been unable to make a jointure. Having now come of age, he was about to do so but was arrested for debt and is in the Fleet Prison with a burning ague and in danger of his life. She asks Cecil for help to arrange for Philippa to take wardship of Walter's younger brother should Walter die.

In 1601–02 the records of feet of fines show that Walter made several small disposals of Calverley lands, followed by the disposal of the manor of Burley in Wharfedale, 40 messuages, a mill and other lands.

On 22 March 1602 Walter made an indenture conveying the remainder of his lands to three trustees for Philippa: Sir John Brooke (Philippa's brother); Edward Heron (husband of Philippa's sister Anne); and Robert Lacy, and three for Walter: William Middleton; Thomas Wentworth; and Richard Middleton.

Before the Statute of Uses (1536), the forerunners of trusts had been made by conveying land to people to the use of the beneficiaries. Lawyers responded to the Statue by conveying land to what became known as trustees to the use of the trustees with a "use upon a use" to the beneficiaries. For some time there was doubt as to whether "uses upon a use" were enforceable, but these doubts were resolved by the Duchess of Suffolk's case (1560). In this case the "use upon a use" was secret; and as that had been found to be enforceable, trusts were created with secret "uses upon a use".

Walter's 1602 indenture gives every appearance of being a trust whose beneficiaries were Walter and Philippa while they both lived, and the survivor after the first death. It provided better terms for Philippa, especially during her widowhood, than would have applied without the trust. After Walter and Philippa had both died, the use reverted to Walter and Philippa's son William (and other heirs male). In their edition of A Yorkshire Tragedy, Cawley and Gaines observe that this indenture guaranteed that the Calverley lands could not be seized because of Walter's recusancy. They suggest that it may also have been to bring order to his tangled affairs.

Calverley and Phillipa had three sons together: William Calverley (1601–1605), Walter Calverley (1603–1605) and Henry Calverley (1604–1661).

== Murders ==
On 23 April 1605, Calverley stabbed his sons William and Walter to death and also stabbed his wife. His infant son Henry was out at a wet-nurse, the wife of a servant who was ordered to fetch him but who refused. Calverley then went off on horseback but was apprehended and taken to Sir John Savile, a local magistrate. He was examined formally by Savile and Sir Thomas Bland, another local magistrate. No papers of the examination survive, but Whitaker's Loidis and Elmete (1816) records it thus:

Being examined whether he did kill two of his own children, [he] saith, that he did kill them both at his own house at Calverley yesterday, being the 23d day of April aforesaid. Being further examined what moved him to wound his wife yesterday, to that he said, that one Carver coming into the chamber where he was with his said wife, he commanded her to will the said Carver to goe and fetch another son of his, whose name is Henry Calverley, who was nursed by the said Carver’s wife, which she accordingly did; whereupon the said Carver went downe into the court, and stayed there about a quarter of an houre, and returned again, but brought not the said child with him; and being commanded to go downe again, he refused so to doe, and that therefore he did wound his wife, if she be wounded. And being further examined, what he wold have done to the said childe if Carver had brought him, to that he said he wold have killed him also. And being likewise examined whether at any time he had any intention to kill his said children, to that he said, that he hath had an intention to kill them for the whole space of two years past, and the reasons that moved him thereunto was, for that his said wife had many times theretofore uttered speeches and given signes and tokens unto him, whereby he mighte easily perceive and conjecture, that the said children were not by him begotten, and that he hath found himself to be in danger of his life sundry times by his wife.

Calverley was detained at Wakefield prison and later transferred to York Castle for trial. He refused to plead, and so was subjected to peine forte et dure; this resulted in his death on 5 August 1605. As the Calverley estates were owned by trustees, they were not at risk of being escheated if Walter had died a convicted felon (he would have known that they were protected from escheat for recusancy). His refusal to plead did ensure that the stock were not forfeit.

== Aftermath ==
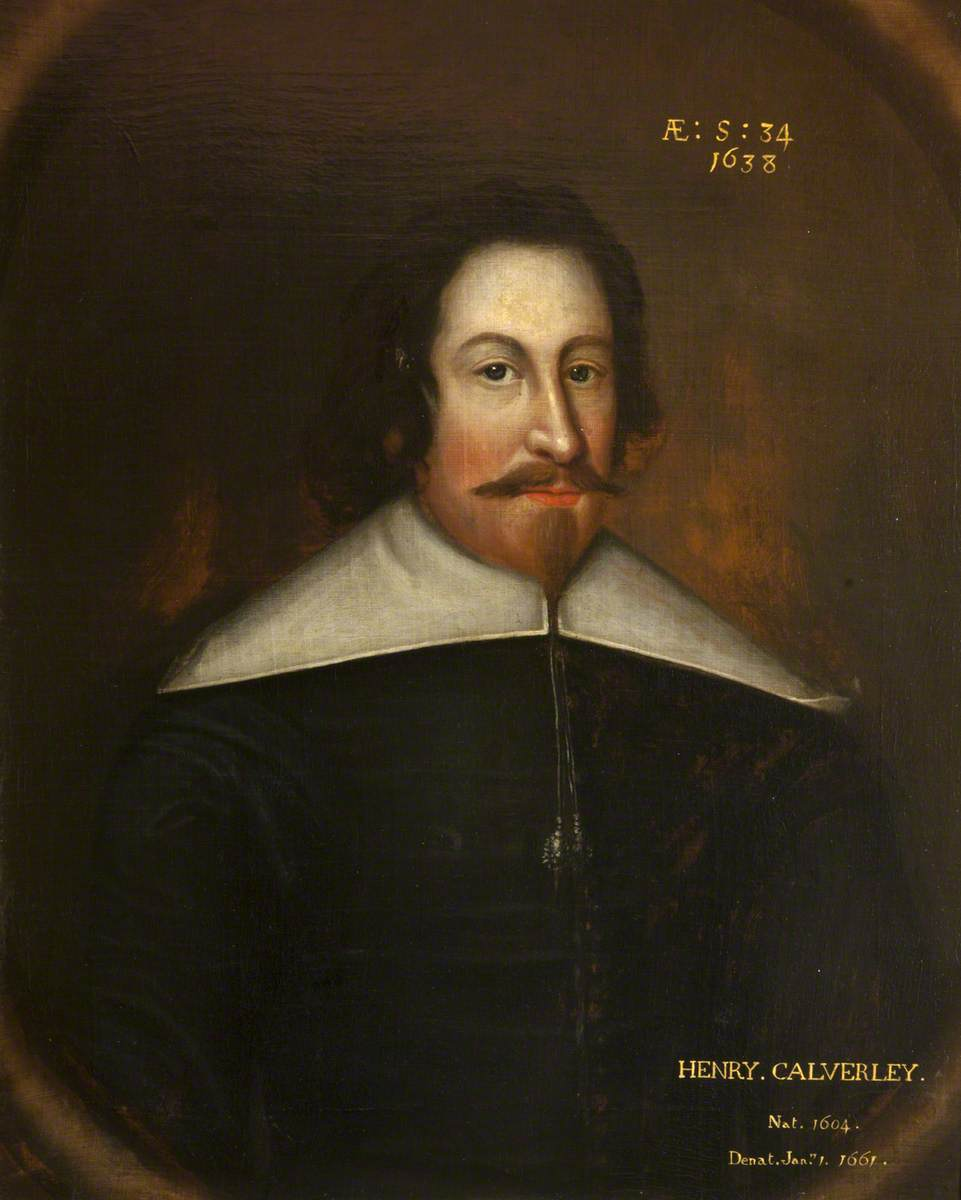
Portrait of the surviving son, Henry Calverley, in 1638.

Henry Calverley became a ward of his mother Philippa. She remarried Thomas Burton (1580-1655) of Stockerston, Leicestershire. Together, they had two daughters, Anne and Elizabeth. In 1613, Phillipa died. Burton later remarried, producing a third child and his heir, Thomas in 1618. In 1622 Burton bought a baronetcy. After reaching his majority in 1625, Henry recovered the Calverley lands and grew up to be a royalist, incurring fines under the Commonwealth.

In the wake of pressure about the abuses of wardship and the consequences of forced marriages, the sale of wardships effectively ended in 1640. At the Restoration in 1660, the Court of Wards and Liveries was not restored. At the ceremony, they declared that the "feudal incidents" had been found by experience

more burdensome, grievous and prejudicial to the kingdom than they had been beneficial to the king

On 1 January 1661, Henry Calverley died and his son, Walter, succeeded him. Walter was later knighted by King Charles II in consideration of his father's loyalty to the crown. Henry was the last of the family to reside regularly at Calverley Hall, his son marrying the heiress of the neighbouring Esholt estate and moving there.

== In literature ==
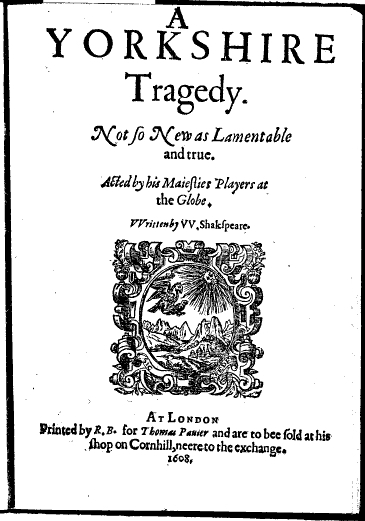
Title page of A Yorkshire Tragedy (1608)

Calverley's position gave his crime wide notoriety. On 12 June, Nathaniel Butter published a popular tract on the subject, which was followed on 24 August by an account of Calverley's death. A ballad was also issued by another publisher, Thomas Pavier, at the same time. Two plays survive telling Calverley's story: A Yorkshire Tragedy, almost certainly written in 1605 but not published until 1608 by Pavier; and Miseries of Enforced Marriage by George Wilkins published in 1607. The full title of A Yorkshire Tragedy continued - not so new as lamentable and true: written by W. Shakspeare, but this appears to have been a bit of puffery. The play was included in the third and fourth folios of William Shakespeare's works (1664 and 1685), but is no longer considered to be his work (modern scholarship generally favouring Thomas Middleton).

Aphra Behn reworked The Miseries of Enforced Marriage into her 1676 play, The Town Fop or, Sir Timothy Tawdry.

== Sources ==
- Attribution

This article incorporates text from a publication now in the public domain: Lee, Sidney (1886). "Calverley, Walter". In Stephen, Leslie (ed.). Dictionary of National Biography. Vol. 8. London: Smith, Elder & Co. p. 265.

- Richardson, Douglas (2011). Magna Carta Ancestry: A Study in Colonial and Medieval Families, ed. Kimball G. Everingham. Vol. IV (2nd ed.). Salt Lake City. ISBN 1460992709
