= The Miseries of Enforced Marriage =

1607 play by George Wilkins

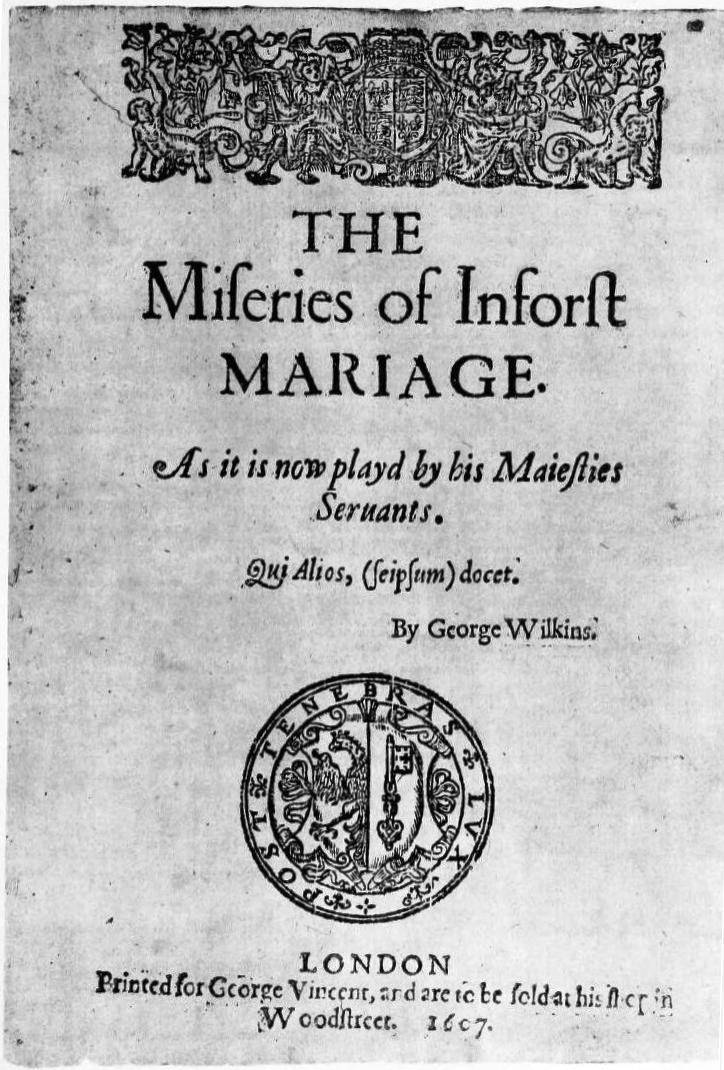
Title page of The Miseries of Inforst Mariage (1607) by George Wilkins

The Miseries of Enforced Marriage is a play written by George Wilkins which was published in London in 1607.

The play is a fictionalised treatment of the real life case of murderer Walter Calverley whose marriage was forced on him through Tudor wardship practices. It relates the protagonist's descent into debauchery, but the story is modified so that it stops short of the murders he committed in 1605.

Wilkins' literary career appears to have been of short duration, but The Miseries of Enforced Marriage was reprinted, and he was involved in another popular stage work for the King's Men, Pericles, Prince of Tyre (Wilkins is generally agreed to have been co-author with William Shakespeare). In later life Wilkins was involved in crime. Wilkins had premises in the area around Cow Cross and Turnmill Street, then a notorious red-light district; he claimed to be running a pub, but court records suggest that it was a front for prostitution.

== Related works ==
Calverley's crimes were the subject of another play A Yorkshire Tragedy (published in 1608) which is attributed to Thomas Middleton.

Aphra Behn reworked The Miseries of Enforced Marriage into her 1676 play, The Town Fop or, Sir Timothy Tawdry.
