= The Unhappy Penitent =

1701 tragedy by Catherine Trotter

- Original language: English
- Written by: Catherine Trotter
- Genre: Tragedy

Premiere
- Date: 4 February 1701
- Place: Theatre Royal, Drury Lane

The Unhappy Penitent is a 1701 tragedy by the English writer Catherine Trotter. It is set at the French court of the late fifteenth century where Charles VIII plans to break his marriage agreement with Margaret of Austria so that he can make a dynastic union with Anne of Brittany acquiring the Duchy of Brittany for France.

The original Drury Lane cast included Robert Wilks as the Duke of Lorraine, John Mills as Charles VIII, Joseph Williams as the Archduke of Austria, Thomas Smith as Brisson, Philip Griffin as the Duke of Brittanie, Thomas Simpson as Du Law, Henry Fairbank as Neapolitan Lord, Jane Rogers as Margarita, Anne Oldfield as Anne and Mary Powell as Madame de Bourboun.

== Bibliography ==
- Burling, William J. A Checklist of New Plays and Entertainments on the London Stage, 1700-1737. Fairleigh Dickinson Univ Press, 1992.
- Cuder-Domínguez, Pilar. Stuart Women Playwrights, 1613–1713. Ashgate Publishing, 2013.
- Nicoll, Allardyce. A History of Early Eighteenth Century Drama: 1700-1750. CUP Archive, 1927.
- Watson, George. The New Cambridge Bibliography of English Literature: Volume 2, 1660–1800. Cambridge University Press, 1971.
