= Like Father, Like Son (play) =

Like Father, Like Son, or The Mistaken Brothers is a lost play written by Aphra Behn, first performed by the Duke's Company in 1682.

Behn based her play, a comedy, on Thomas Randolph's The Jealous Lovers (which was printed in 1640 and published in 1643).

Pierre Danchin suggests that the title may allude to a notorious Whig ballad that included the words 'Like father, like son', which was accused of inciting regicide (Behn herself was a royalist).

Like Father, Like Son proved to be such a failure with audiences that it was the only one of Behn's plays never to be printed. All that survives are its prologue and epilogue, which were printed in 1682.
