= The Dutch Lover =

Comedic play

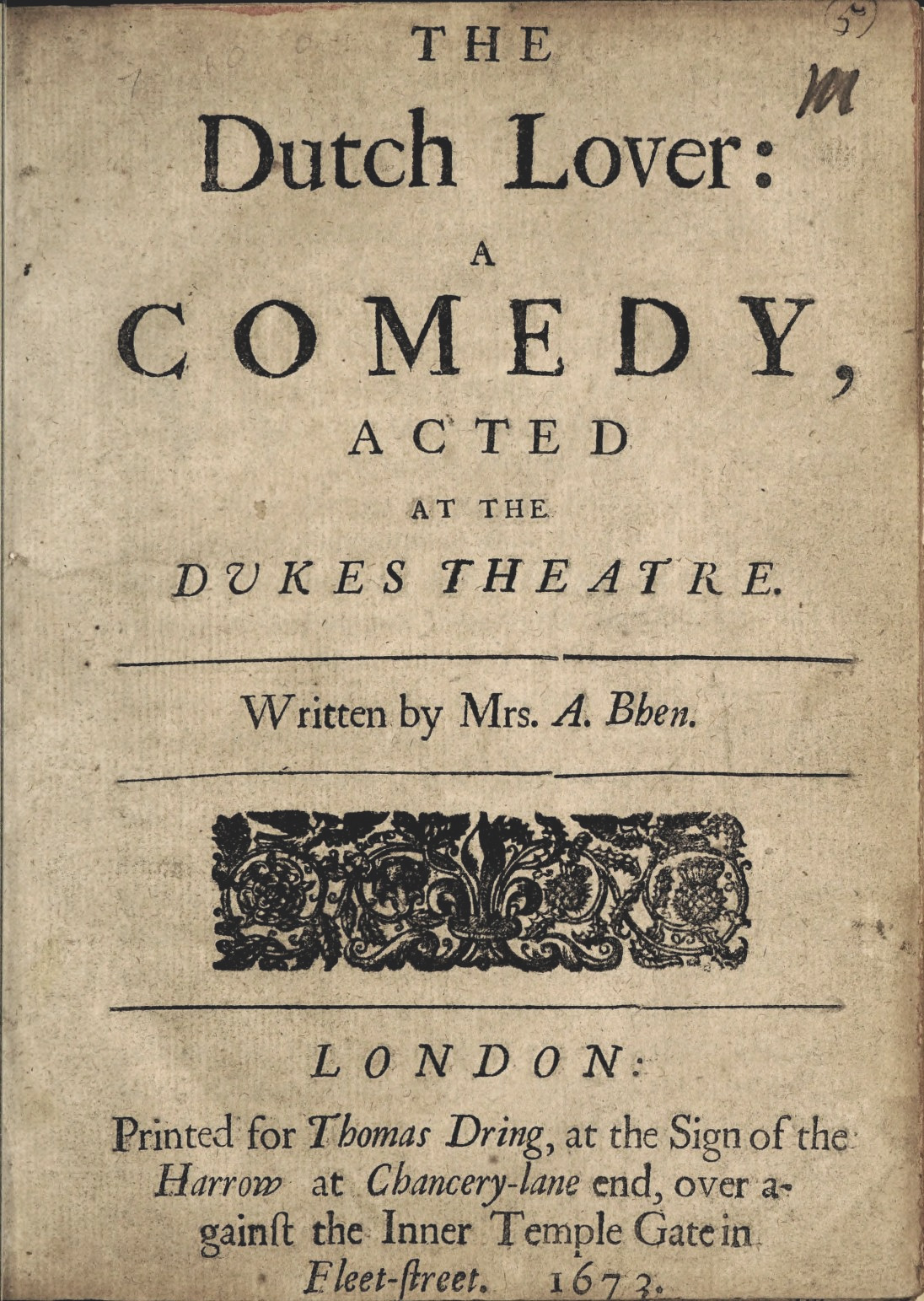
The title page of the first edition of The Dutch Lover (1673)

The Dutch Lover is a comedic play written by Aphra Behn, first performed and published in 1673. It came out during the Third Anglo-Dutch War and is an example of wartime propaganda, seen most obviously in the ludicrous character of Haunce van Ezel, the 'Dutch lover' of the title.

In the prologue, Behn challenged those critics who sabotaged her work because she was a woman.

== Plot ==
The play is set in Madrid, where Haunce van Ezel, a foppish Dutchman, is due to have an arranged marriage with Euphemia, daughter of Don Carlo. However, Haunce does not actually arrive in Madrid until Act III - by which time Euphemia has fallen in love with Alonzo, a Flemish colonel.

Alonzo had originally come to Madrid to marry Hippolyta, but like Haunce and Euphemia, the two had never met beforehand: Hippolyta's brother Marcel had arranged their planned marriage (although Marcel is mortified to discover that Hippolyta has had a sexual relationship with another cavalier, Antonio).

Alonzo decides to marry Euphemia himself. When Haunce finally does arrive on the scene, various humorous incidents based on mistaken identity occur: to Don Carlo, the real Haunce and the fake Haunce seem equally ludicrous and indistinguishable. These escapades give Alonzo and Euphemia time to marry.

By the end of the play, Euphemia is married to Alonzo; Hippolyta to Antoinio; and Haunce to Olinda, one of Euphemia's maids.
