= The Emperor of the Moon =

1687 play

- Original language: English
- Written by: Aphra Behn
- Genre: Restoration Comedy

Premiere
- Date: March 1687
- Place: Dorset Garden Theatre, London

The Emperor of the Moon is a Restoration farce written by Aphra Behn in 1687, based on Italian commedia dell'arte. It was Behn's second most successful play (after The Rover), probably due to the lightness of the plot and its accompanying musical and spectacular entertainment. The music is largely lost today. The play was not fitted out like a big opera, because producers were unwilling to finance a costly opera following the failure of Dryden's Albion and Albanius. The plan was to make audiences come back to the playhouse and attend an affordable mini-spectacle like The Emperor of the Moon.

It was first staged at the Dorset Garden Theatre by the United Company. The original cast included Cave Underhill as Dr Baliardo, Anthony Leigh as Scaramouch, Thomas Jevon as Harlequin, Sarah Cooke as Elaria and Katherine Corey as Mopsophil.

== Plot ==
Dr. Baliardo believes that the moon is inhabited, and that he will be able to spy on its king through his telescope. His obsession leads him to neglect his daughter Elaria and his niece Bellemante.

Don Cinthio and Don Charmante form a plan to marry Elaria and Bellemante, as well as to cure Baliardo's obsession. They masquerade as the Emperor of the Moon and his brother, the Prince of Thunderland. The gullible Baliardo receives these otherworldly suitors, and so the stage is set for the grand finale: a masque-like pageant that the schemers perform in an abandoned building. There, Baliardo is greeted by (allegedly) the Emperor of the Moon's court and the entire zodiac.

== Reception ==
The Emperor of the Moon has often been seen as one of Behn's more lightweight offerings. However, Al Coppola suggests that Behn in fact lampoons the enthusiastic but credulous Baliardo 'only to direct the audience's own untrustworthy gaze toward the threat posed by enthusiasm to domestic and civil harmony; toward the debased condition of the theatre; and, above all, toward the irrational credulity stoked by Whig politics during the Exclusion Crisis, which the Court faction had inadvisably embraced during James's reign'.
