= John Hoyle (died 1692) =

English bisexual lawyer (died 1692)

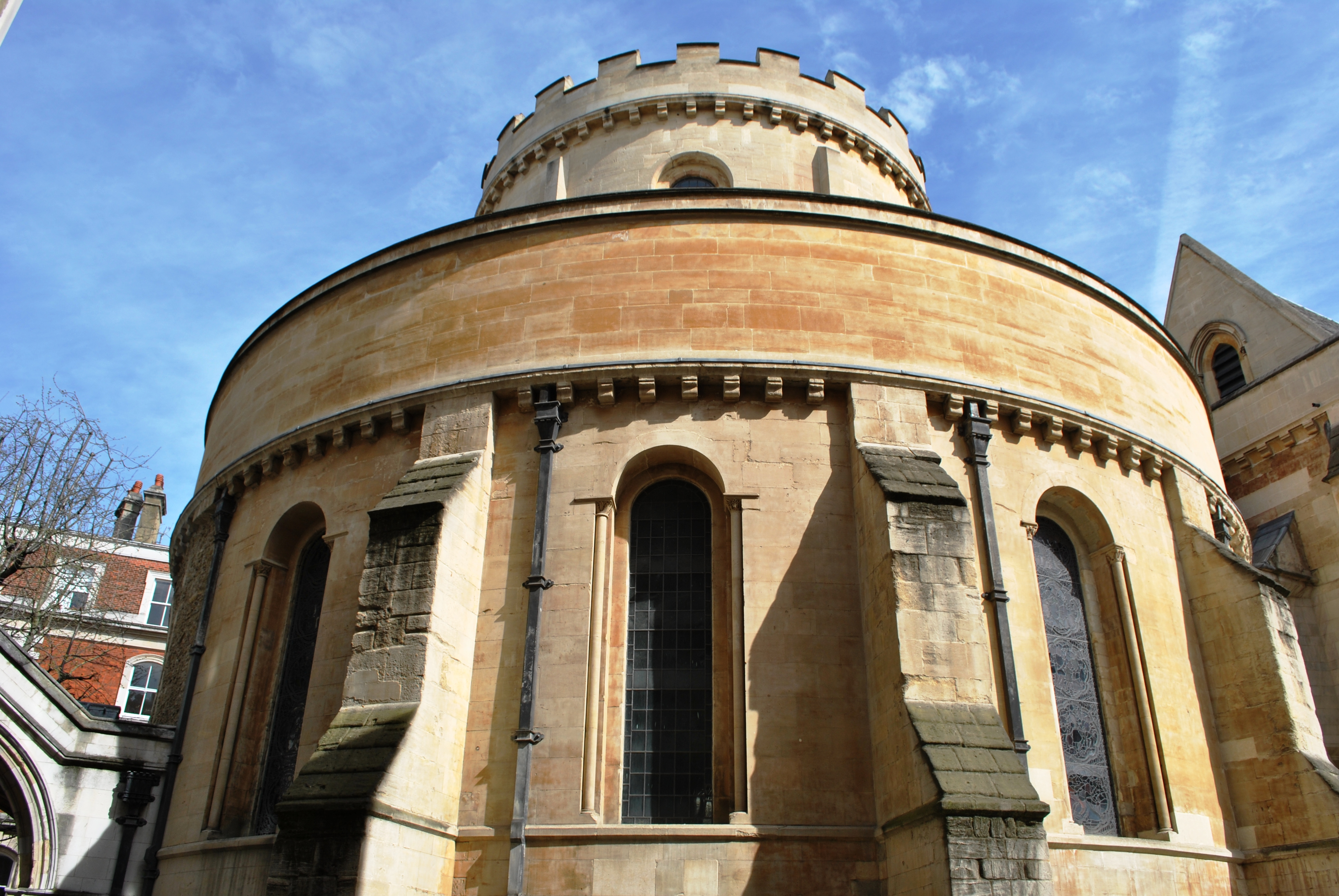
The Temple Church is a late 12th-century church in the City of London located between Fleet Street and the River Thames, built by the Knights Templar as their English headquarters.

John Hoyle (died 1692) was a bisexual lawyer in London and a lover of the writer Aphra Behn. Behn's relationship with Hoyle was the "dominating one" in her life.

== Family ==
Hoyle was the eldest son of Thomas Hoyle (baptised 29 January 1587 - died 30 January 1650) who was a member of the Parliament of England during the English Civil War (1642–1651) and became lord mayor of York when the city surrendered in July 1644. Thomas Hoyle was among those who supported the execution of King Charles I (1649), and he hanged himself one year later.

== Career and personal life ==
Hoyle was a lawyer who received his training at Gray's Inn and was a member of the Inner Temple, London. He was openly republican and follower of Thomas Hobbes.

While still a law student, in 1663, or possibly in 1665, he stabbed an unarmed watchmaker, who died six days later. Despite a number of witnesses against him, he escaped the murder charge with a verdict of ignoramus, i.e. there was not sufficient evidence to convict him. Hoyle was arrested again in 1687, this time for the crime of "sodomy with a poulterer". The grand jury returned again a verdict of ignoramus.

== Aphra Behn ==
In the 1670s, he was an intimate of the pioneering woman writer and playwright Aphra Behn. Their relationship was tumultuous. Tom Brown published a letter from Aphra Behn to John Hoyle in "Letters of Love and Gallantry", Behn was asking Hoyle to exculpate himself in regards of the accusations made against him; she was upset about his behaviour, and asked him to try to restore his reputation. He figures in much of Behn's writings and is thought to be one of the two models for the promiscuous protagonist of Behn's 1677 play The Rover. Behn died in 1689 and is buried in Westminster Abbey. It has been said that John Hoyle wrote her epitaph: "Here lies a proof that wit can never be / Defense enough against mortality."

== Death ==
Around 1692, Hoyle was stabbed to death "after a drunken brawl in a tavern" and is buried in the vault belonging to the Inner Temple Church.
