= Agnes de Castro (play) =

1695 play

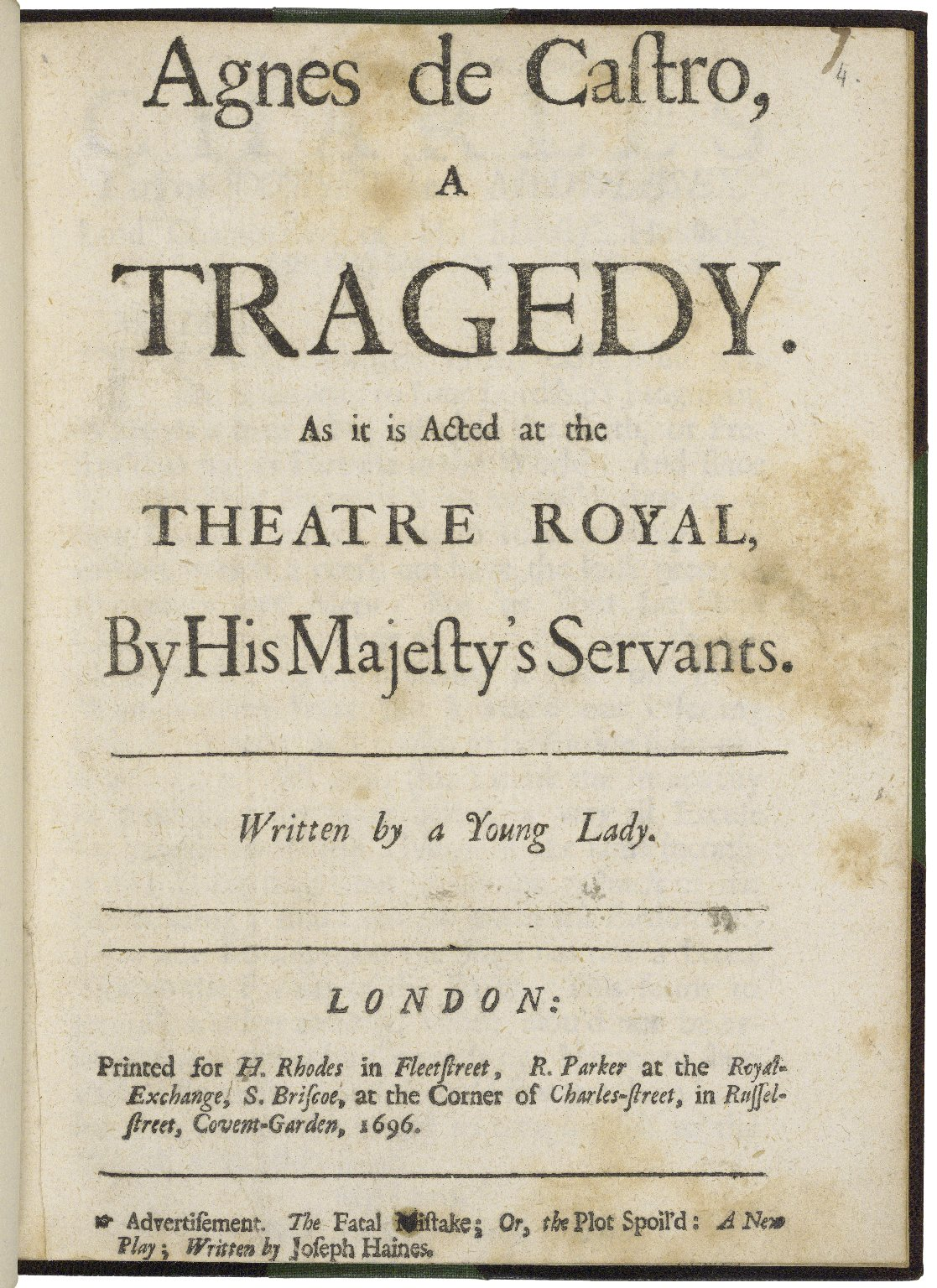
- Original language: English
- Written by: Catharine Trotter
- Genre: Tragedy

Premiere
- Date: December 1695
- Place: Theatre Royal, Drury Lane, London

Agnes de Castro is a 1696 tragedy by the English writer Catharine Trotter. Based on the novel of the same title by Jean-Baptiste de Brilhac, it was first staged by Christopher Rich's company at the Theatre Royal, Drury Lane.

The original Drury Lane cast included Thomas Simpson as King, George Powell as Prince, John Verbruggen as Alvaro, Colley Cibber as Lorenzo, John Mills as Pedro, Jane Rogers as Agnes de Castro, Mary Kent as Bianca and Frances Maria Knight as Elvira. The prologue was written by William Wycherley. The published version was dedicated to the Duke of Dorset.

== Bibliography ==
- Van Lennep, W. The London Stage, 1660-1800: Volume One, 1660-1700. Southern Illinois University Press, 1960.
