= The Luckey Chance =

1686 play

- Original language: English
- Written by: Aphra Behn
- Genre: Restoration Comedy

Premiere
- Date: April 1686
- Place: Theatre Royal, Drury Lane, London

The Luckey Chance, or an Alderman's Bargain by Aphra Behn is a 17th-century comedy in five acts. The play was first staged in the Spring of 1686. Its main theme is romance and it includes devices such as impersonation and disguise, and a masque including music and dancing. Some songs were composed by John Blow.

The play continues to be performed. In 1984 it was performed at the Royal Court Theatre as the first production of the Women's Playhouse Trust (now known as The Wapping Project). A version in 1960s dress was staged by Echo Theatre in 2013 at the Bath House Cultural Center in Texas, United States.
