= Catharine Trotter Cockburn =

Scottish philosopher and dramatist (1679–1749)

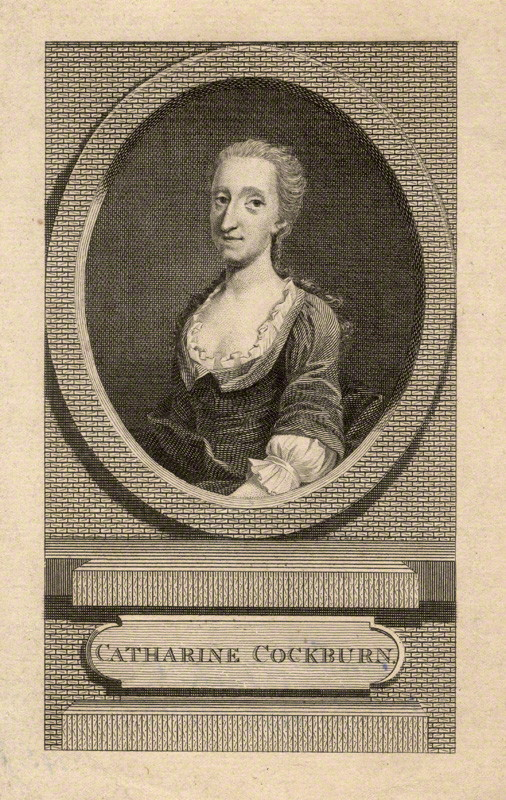
- Born: Catharine Trotter; 16 August 1679; London, England
- Died: 11 May 1749 (aged 69); Longhorsley, England
- Occupations: Novelist, dramatist, philosopher
- Spouse: Patrick Cockburn (m. 1708)
- Writing career
- Language: English
- Genre: Correspondence
- Subjects: Moral philosophy, theological tracts

Catharine Trotter Cockburn (16 August 1679 – 11 May 1749) was a Scottish novelist, dramatist and philosopher who wrote on various subjects, including moral philosophy and theology, and maintained a prolific correspondence.

Trotter's writings encompass a wide range of topics, such as necessity, the infinitude of space and substance. However, her primary focus was on moral issues. She believed that moral principles were not inherent but could be discovered by each individual through the use of reason, a faculty bestowed by God. In 1702, she published her first significant philosophical work, titled "A Defence of Mr. Lock's [sic.] An Essay Concerning Human Understanding." This defence received praise from John Locke, who expressed his appreciation by providing financial support and books to Trotter via Elizabeth Burnet, the intermediary who first acquainted Locke with Trotter's "Defence."

Trotter's work garnered the attention of William Warburton, who wrote a preface for her final philosophical work. Additionally, the biographer Thomas Birch approached her to assist him in compiling a collection of her works. Although Trotter agreed to the project, she died before the publication could be completed. As a result, Birch posthumously published a two-volume collection titled "The Works of Mrs. Catharine Cockburn, Theological, Moral, Dramatic and Poetical" in 1751. This collection serves as a primary source by which readers and historians have come to know her contributions.

== Early life and education ==
Catharine Trotter was born in London on 16 August 1674 or 1679, (Note: Catharine Trotter was most likely born in 1674 rather than the later date of 1679, which had been previously accepted.) to Scottish parents. Her father, Captain David Trotter, was a respected commodore in the Royal Navy, known personally to King Charles II and the Duke of York, who valued his distinguished service. In 1683, Captain Trotter participated in the demolition of Tangier, and while escorting the fleet of merchant ships belonging to the Turkey Company, he succumbed to the plague in Alexandretta (Iscanderoon) in early 1684. Unfortunately, his widow and children faced financial hardship as his property fell into dishonest hands. Catharine's mother, Sarah Bellenden, was closely related to Lord Bellenden, the Duke of Lauderdale and the Earl of Perth.

Catharine Trotter was initially raised as a Protestant but converted to Roman Catholicism at a young age.

During the remaining years of King Charles II's reign, Mrs Trotter received a pension from the Admiralty, and Queen Anne granted her an annual allowance of £20. It is likely that the widow received additional support from her husband's brother and her own affluent cousins in raising her two fatherless daughters. The elder daughter married Dr Inglis, a medical officer who served with the Duke of Marlborough in his military campaigns and later became the army's physician-general.

Catharine, the younger daughter, displayed a keen intellect, a natural aptitude for acquiring knowledge and a talent for penmanship and extemporaneous verse from an early age. Although her formal education is not documented, she referred to it in "Poem on the Busts," suggesting that it was modest and ordinary. Nevertheless, her thirst for knowledge remained unquenched and obstacles only fueled her determination. She avidly read books, progressing from imaginative works that captivated her as a child to treatises on moral philosophy and religion as her reasoning abilities and judgment developed. She taught herself French and, with the help of a friend, Latin. Her verses, written at the age of fourteen and sent to Mr Beville Higgons, were intended as encouraging advice, emphasizing resignation and the conscientious application of the admirable qualities attributed to him rather than solely expressing admiration for his charms.

== Early productions ==
Her writings were didactic in nature, and while her songs contained amorous elements, they emphasized self-control and morality. Due to her father's professional connections, her mother's aristocratic ties, and her own remarkable talents, Catharine Trotter had a wide circle of acquaintances. Despite facing financial constraints and likely having little wealth of her own apart from her writing earnings, Trotter moved in esteemed social circles and was frequently welcomed as a guest in the homes of the wealthy and influential. Her beauty and genuine manners exuded an unassuming intellectual superiority.

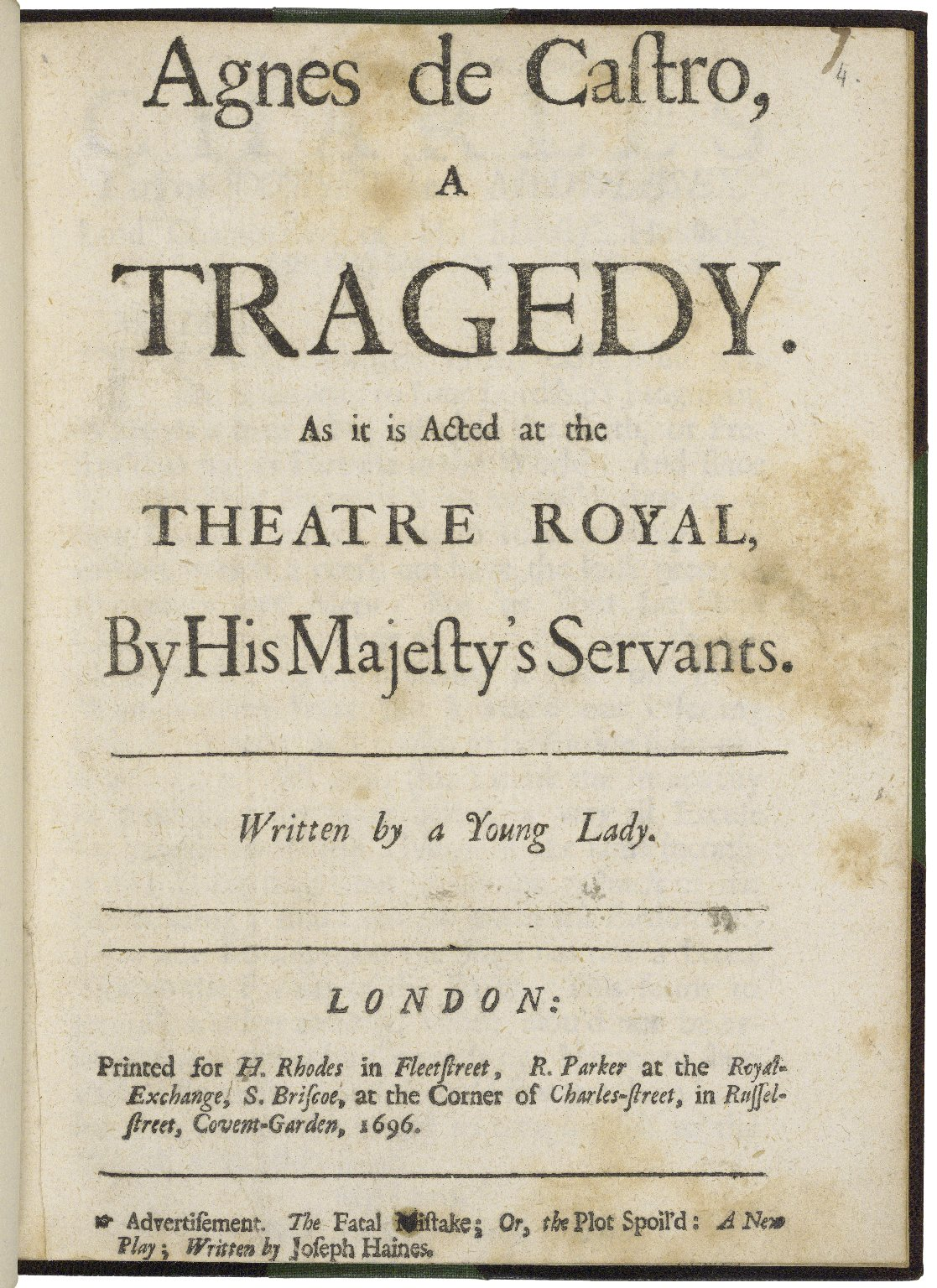
The title page of a 1696 edition of Trotter's Agnes de Castro

At the age of 14, Trotter published her first novel, titled The Adventures of a Young Lady (later retitled Olinda's Adventures), anonymously in 1693. Just two years later, in 1695, her first play, Agnes de Castro, was staged at the Theatre Royal and published the following year. The dedication in the published version revealed her personal friendship and advisory relationship with the Earl of Dorset and Middlesex. This tragic play was not based on historical events but on Aphra Behn's English translation of a French novel.

In 1696, Trotter, along with Delarivier Manley and Mary Pix, was satirized in the anonymous play The Female Wits. She was depicted as "Calista, a lady who pretends to have learned languages and assumes for herself the name of critic." The following year, Trotter sent a set of complimentary verses to William Congreve regarding his play The Mourning Bride, which likely sparked or solidified Congreve's interest in her literary pursuits. Congreve's published letter to her indicates their prior acquaintance.

In 1698, her second tragedy, Fatal Friendship, was performed at the newly established theater in Lincoln's Inn Fields. It was later published with a dedication to the Princess of Wales. The play not only solidified Trotter's reputation as a playwright but also garnered a shower of complimentary verses and expanded her network of influential and fashionable friends. It is reasonable to assume that it brought considerable financial gain.

Before the text of Fatal Friendship, several sets of eulogistic verses were dedicated to Trotter, including one by P. Harman, who also wrote the prologue; one by an anonymous writer (likely Lady Sarah Piers); and another by the playwright John Hughes, who hailed her as "the first of stage reformers." The language used is straightforward and unaffected, occasionally employing colloquial contractions like "'em" for "them," which became popular during the Restoration period. The plot of the play is ordinary but well-crafted, featuring compelling dramatic situations. The moral lesson drawn at the conclusion emphasizes the importance of self-distrust and the dangers of overconfidence. While contemporary critics regarded Fatal Friendship as Trotter's finest dramatic work, Dr. Birch regretfully omitted her four other plays due to space constraints in his edition of her works.

In 1700, Trotter was among the audacious Englishwomen who collectively mourned the death of John Dryden in verse under the collective names of the Nine Muses. As a result, she received praise and was addressed as a "muse" by a group of admiring poets.

In early 1701, her comedy Love at a Loss, or Most Votes Carry It, was performed at the Theatre Royal and published in May of the same year, with a dedication to Lady Piers. According to Dr. Birch, Trotter had formed an early and close friendship with Lady Piers. Later in the same year, her third tragedy, The Unhappy Penitent, was performed at Drury Lane and published in August. It was dedicated to Lord Halifax, and a set of verses by Lady Piers was included, inscribed "To the excellent Mrs. Catherine Trotter." In May 1702, Trotter wrote her defense of Mr. Locke's Essay of Human Understanding, which earned her the personal friendship of John Locke and Lady Masham. Through them, she was introduced to many notable individuals, including Mr. Peter King, a barrister and member of Parliament who was Locke's maternal nephew.

== Religious conversions ==
=== Roman Catholic Church ===
Considering the background and connections of her parents, it is plausible that Trotter was not raised with a strong religious upbringing. Consequently, during a spiritual crisis, she may have sought guidance from a Roman Catholic teacher and, as a result, fervently adopted the Catholic faith. She remained devoted to this faith for many years, relying on its initial influence. However, her strict adherence to fasting days had detrimental effects on her health. In October 1703, her friend and physician, Dr. Denton Nicholas, wrote her a serious letter of remonstration, urging her to reduce the severity of her abstinence practices due to the strain they imposed on her naturally delicate constitution. He requested that his opinion be conveyed to her friends and confessor.

Even at her healthiest, Trotter's fragile constitution prevented her from walking more than a mile to church and back on a summer day without experiencing fatigue bordering on illness. Moreover, her weak eyesight made writing by candlelight a painful task. Nevertheless, she possessed an independent and energetic spirit that allowed her to sustain the mental and physical effort required for meticulous literary composition over extended periods. She also managed the complex tasks associated with the performance, printing and publication of her works with methodical precision.

Between 1701 and her marriage in 1708, Catherine Trotter maintained a regular correspondence with her friend George Burnet, Esq., of Kemnay. Throughout most of this period, Burnet traveled abroad, particularly to the courts of Berlin and Hanover, where he spread the reputation of "la nouvelle Sappho-Ecossoise" and aroused the curiosity of Leibnitz, who sought to become acquainted with her philosophical works. It can be inferred from various passages in their letters that Burnet wished to establish a romantic connection with Trotter. However, with genuine candor and sincere esteem, she rebuffed any advances towards a declaration of love. While she had many admirers, she never yielded to the persuasions of her friends or the allure of wealth and status to entertain suitors for whom she felt no affection.

In 1704, Trotter composed a poem celebrating the Duke of Marlborough's victory at the Battle of Blenheim. The poem received high praise from the hero and his family and was published. Around that time, she harbored hopes of obtaining a pension from the crown, supported by the influential Marlborough family, due to her father's long service and sacrifices for King and country. However, she failed to secure the pension and received only a gratuity. After the Battle of Ramilies in 1706, she penned another poem in honor of the Duke of Marlborough, and her verses on both occasions were regarded as among the best commemorating his achievements. In the same year, her tragedy titled The Revolution of Sweden, based on Vertot's account of Gustavus Ericson, was performed at the Queen's Theatre in the Haymarket and subsequently published with a dedication to Lady Harriet Godolphin, the eldest daughter of the Duke and later Duchess of Marlborough in her own right following his passing.

Trotter's sister, Mrs. Inglis, resided in Salisbury, and her mother also spent considerable time there. As a result, Catherine frequently made extended visits to the city, sometimes lasting up to fifteen months. However, her preferred residence was at "Mr. Finney's, in Beaufort Buildings on the Strand," where she could occupy private lodgings without the constraints of domestic responsibilities or the disruptions caused by young children. One of the positive outcomes of her stays in Salisbury was her acquaintance with Bishop Gilbert Burnet and his third wife, Elizabeth, who was the eldest daughter of Sir Richard Blake and the widow of Robert Berkeley, Esq., of Spetchley. Mrs. Burnet, who had a substantial independent income, took a warm interest in Trotter until her own death in 1709.

=== Return to the Church of England ===
In Trotter's perspective, a sense of duty towards God and a commitment to reform and improve the world were consistently prominent. However, she pursued different methods to achieve this goal at various stages of her life. In 1707, after engaging in intensive study, deep reflection and sincere prayer, she renounced the Roman Catholic faith. She then wrote and published Two Letters Concerning a Guide in Controversies, which included a preface by Bishop Burnet. The first letter was addressed to Mr. Bennet, a priest, while the second served as a response to an answer she had received. In these letters, Trotter presented strong, lucid and logical arguments explaining her religious conversion. Following this event, she remained steadfast in her unwavering commitment to the orthodox beliefs of the Church of England, without any subsequent doubts troubling her.

== Reverend Cockburn ==
In the summer of 1707, during her stay with Madame de Vere, an invalid residing near Ripley, Surrey, Catherine Trotter encountered a young clergyman named Fenn. She greatly admired his preaching, conversation and character. Mr. Fenn developed strong feelings for her and proposed marriage, receiving the support and intervention of Lady Piers. While Trotter valued Fenn's friendship, she had already developed a preference for another individual. This favored rival was Rev. Patrick Cockburn, a scholar and gentleman who had a distant relationship to both the Burnet and Trotter families. They had engaged in friendly correspondence for several months, discussing topics related to philosophy and practical religion that were of significant interest to both parties. The advances made by Mr. Fenn led to mutual realisation, and the situation reached a critical point.

=== Pause in writing ===
In 1708, Cockburn was ordained in the Church of England, married Trotter and obtained the "donative" of Nayland near Colchester.

Cockburn later became curate at St. Dunstan's Church in Fleet Street, and the family returned to London, where they lived until the death of Queen Anne in 1714. The oath of abjuration, required upon the accession of King George I, raised concerns for Rev. Cockburn and he refused to take it (although he did continue to offer public prayers for the reigning sovereign and the royal family). As a result of his refusal, he was deprived of his employment in the church and reduced to poverty. Over the next twelve years he supported his family by teaching Latin to students at the Academy in Chancery Lane.

=== Return to writing ===
From 1708 until 1724, Trotter did not publish any works. However, in 1724, she wrote a letter to Dr. Holdsworth, which she later published in January 1727 after receiving a detailed and controversial response from him. Winch Holdsworth publicly replied to her letter, and Trotter wrote a skillful rejoinder. Although "Vindication of Mr. Locke's Christian Principles from the Injurious Imputations of Dr. Holdsworth" remained unpublished due to the reluctance of booksellers, it was eventually included in her collected works.

One of Trotter's notable poetic productions was "A Poem, occasioned by the Busts set up in the Queen's Hermitage, designed to be presented with a book in vindication of Mr. Locke, which was to have been inscribed to Her Majesty." In this work, she eloquently argued from the honors bestowed by Queen Caroline upon the busts of Clarke, Locke and Newton, including her patronage of the poet Nicholas Duck. Trotter's interpretation of Locke's opinions was considered accurate by Locke himself during his lifetime and by his close associates after his death, surpassing the interpretations of other renowned metaphysicians of her time and subsequent generations.

In 1726, Rev. Cockburn changed his stance and decided to take the Oath of Abjuration upon the accession of George I. He was appointed to St. Paul's Chapel in Aberdeen the following year, and his family accompanied him there. In 1737, the Bishop of Durham ordered him to reside in his parish, Long Horseley, near Morpeth in Northumberland. Trotter bid farewell to London, the place of her many achievements and challenges, in that same year.

While living in Aberdeen, Trotter wrote the "Verses occasioned by the Busts in the Queen's Hermitage," which were published in the Gentleman's Magazine in May 1737. In August 1743, her "Remarks upon some Writers in the Controversy concerning the Foundation of Moral Duty and Obligation" were published in "The History of the Works of the Learned" serial. These remarks received positive reception and admiration, leading to an epistolary discussion with her friend, Dr. Sharp, the archdeacon of Northumberland, on the subject matter. The correspondence lasted from August 8, 1743, to October 2, 1747.

In 1744, Dr. Rutherford's "Essay on the Nature and Obligations of Virtue" prompted Trotter's engagement in public controversy once again. In April 1747, her "Remarks upon the Principles and Reasonings of Dr. Rutherford's Essay on the Nature and Obligations of Virtue, in Vindication of the Contrary Principles and Reasonings enforced in the Writings of the late Dr. Samuel Clarke" were published with a preface by Bishop Warburton. This work gained extraordinary acclaim, leading to discussions about republishing Trotter's entire body of work through a subscription, an idea supported by her fashionable and prominent friends. Unfortunately, various circumstances prevented the full realization of this plan.

== Style and themes ==
In Trotter's verses titled "Calliope's Directions: How to Deserve and Distinguish the Muse's Inspirations," she skillfully defines the uses of tragic, comic and satiric poetry. As Calliope, her jurisdiction extended only to heroic strains and general eloquence, making it inappropriate to discuss any other type of verse. A few lines from the poem exemplify her style:

"Let none presume the hallowed way to tread
By other than the noblest motives led :
If for a sordid gain, or glittering fame,
To please without instructing be your aim,
To lower means your grovelling thoughts confine,
Unworthy of an art that's all divine."

Trotter's hiatus from writing, spanning sixteen to eighteen years, garnered public attention, as did her subsequent return to writing. Commentators on her works may have misinterpreted her own words on this matter, drawing unwarranted conclusions. During those years, Trotter had limited exposure to new books. Nevertheless, she possessed works such as the Bible, Shakespeare and Milton's writings, Lord Bacon's works, Cudworth's works and Bishop Cumberland's works. Despite her withdrawal from the bustling center of British activity, her seclusion allowed her reflections to mature, enriching her intellectual growth more than continuous observation would have. Her mental faculties remained sharp and polished through constant exercise. Extracts from her controversial writings demonstrate her writing style.

In the preface to her "Letter to Dr. Holdsworth," Trotter made a statement, possibly referring to Lord King:

"The great zeal Mr. Locke showed for the conversion of deists, the serious veneration he expresses for the Divine Revelation, and (how little soever he was fond of particular systems) the care he took not to oppose any established articles of faith, make it a work worthy a sincere Christian to support his character against the injudiciousness of those who have reproached him as a Socinian heretic, an enemy, an underminer of religion. That there are no plain proofs from his writings to ground such a charge upon, is a sufficient foundation for this defence; but that he was certainly no Socinian, I am farther well assured by the authority of one who was intimate to his most private thoughts, and who is as eminent for his probity, as for the high station he at present possesses."

In a letter to her niece dated "Long Horseley, September 29, 1748," Trotter expressed her dissatisfaction upon reviewing Mr. Locke's views on moral relations, stating that his plan limited the consideration to the present order of things. While he was not guilty of making morality uncertain, Trotter feared that his ideas might have unintentionally fueled a contemporary, overly ambitious scheme. Trotter's opinion of Bishop Butler, one of her most esteemed contemporaries, is also noteworthy. In letters to Mrs. Arbuthnot from 1738, she praised Bishop Butler's judicious writing, his profound understanding of human nature and his clarity of thought. Trotter emphasized that various modern moralists had been insufficient in establishing moral virtue solely on the moral sense, the essential difference and relations of things, or the sole will of God. She argued that all three principles together formed a solid foundation and obligation for moral practice, with the moral sense, conscience and essential difference of things revealing God's will. Trotter held Bishop Butler's "The Analogy" in high regard and considered it a valuable work that effectively addressed objections raised by deists, reinforcing the believer's conviction in God's wisdom and reconciliation with mankind. In later letters, dated October 2, 1747, from "Long Horseley," Trotter reiterated her deep appreciation for Bishop Butler's writings, expressing complete satisfaction with his doctrine and endorsing every sentence he wrote as aligning with her theological beliefs.

== Personal life ==
The Cockburns had three daughters named Mary, Catherine and Grissel, and a son named John.

In 1743 one of Trotter's daughters died, followed by her husband in January 1749. This took a toll on Trotter's health and she died on May 11, 1749, in Longhorsley, near Morpeth. Trotter was buried alongside her husband and youngest daughter in Longhorsley. Their tomb bore an inscription derived from Proverbs 31:31, altered to read, "Let their own works praise them in the gates."

== Legacy ==
Trotter's reputation has undergone changes over the past three centuries, with a recent resurgence in interest due to the efforts of feminist critics, including Anne Kelley. Some suggest that the decline of her reputation can be attributed to the fact that she produced a significant amount of work early in her life but less in her later years. Her career was heavily focused on the beginning, and the literary community of her time, particularly men, often emphasized her youth and beauty rather than her writings. Certain literary historians believe that her relative obscurity resulted from an overemphasis on her philosophical works at the expense of her creative writing. Thomas Birch, her biographer, included only one play in his two-volume collection of her works and disregarded "Olinda's Adventures" entirely. Some critics deemed her philosophical writings as derivative, particularly her defense of Locke's Essay, which potentially affected her reputation.

Contemporary scholarly interest in Trotter's dramatic writing has centered on gender studies, acknowledging the influence of her gender on her work. Trotter herself recognized the limitations imposed on her as a woman and expressed her discontent through her writing. In the dedication to "Fatal Friendship" (1698), she reflects on the expectation of facing criticism when a woman assumes a distinct role in society, especially if she engages in what is considered the domain of men. Both Trotter's literary works, where women play prominent roles, and her personal life offer substantial material for feminist analysis.

== Selected works ==
=== Play productions ===
- Agnes de Castro, London, Theatre Royal in Drury Lane, December 1695 or 27–31 1696.
- Fatal Friendship, London, Lincoln's Inn Fields, circa late May or early June 1698.
- Love at a Loss, or, Most Votes Carry It (later rewritten as The Honourable Deceiver; or, All Right at the Last), London, Theatre Royal in Drury Lane, 23 November 1700.
- The Unhappy Penitent, London, Theatre Royal in Drury Lane, 4 February 1701.
- The Revolution of Sweden, London, Queen's Theatre, 11 February 1706.

=== Books (short titles) ===
- Agnes de Castro, A Tragedy. (London: Printed for H. Rhodes, R. Parker & S. Briscoe, 1696).
- Fatal Friendship. A Tragedy. (London: Printed for Francis Saunders, 1698).
- Love at a Loss, or, Most Votes Carry It. A Comedy. (London: Printed for William Turner, 1701).
- The Unhappy Penitent, A Tragedy. (London: Printed for William Turner & John Nutt, 1701).
- A Defence of Mr. Lock's [sic.] Essay of Human Understanding. (London: Printed for Will. Turner & John Nutt, 1702).
- The Revolution of Sweden. A Tragedy. (London: Printed for James Knapton & George Strahan, 1706).
- A Discourse concerning a Guide in Controversies, in Two Letters. (London: Printed for A. & J. Churchill, 1707).
- A Letter to Dr. Holdsworth, Occasioned by His Sermon Preached before the University of Oxford. (London: Printed for Benjamin Motte, 1726).
- Remarks Upon the Principles and Reasonings of Dr. Rutherforth's Essay on the Nature and Obligations of Virtue. (London: Printed for J. & P. Knapton, 1747). Against Thomas Rutherforth.
- The Works of Mrs. Catharine Cockburn, Theological, Moral, Dramatic and Poetical. 2 vols. (London: Printed for J. & P. Knapton, 1751).

=== Other publications ===
- Olinda's Adventures; or, The Amours of a Young Lady, in volume 1 of Letters of Love and Gallantry and Several Other Subjects. (London: Printed for Samuel Briscoe, 1693).
- Epilogue, in Queen Catharine or, The Ruines[sic.] of Love, by Mary Pix. (London: Printed for William Turner & Richard Basset, 1698).
- "Calliope: The Heroick [sic.] Muse: On the Death of John Dryden, Esq.; By Mrs. C. T." in The Nine Muses. Or, Poems Written by Nine severall [sic.] Ladies Upon the Death of the late Famous John Dryden, Esq. (London: Printed for Richard Basset, 1700).
- "Poetical Essays; May 1737: Verses, occasion'd by the Busts in the Queen's Hermitage." Gentleman's Magazine, 7 (1737): 308.

=== Works in print ===
- Catharine Trotter Cockburn: Philosophical Writings. Ed. Patricia Sheridan. Peterborough, ON: Broadview Press, 2006. ISBN 1-55111-302-3. $24.95 CDN.
- "Love at a Loss: or, Most Votes Carry It." Ed. Roxanne M. Kent-Drury. The Broadview Anthology of Restoration & Early Eighteenth-Century Drama. Ed. J. Douglas Canfield. Peterborough, ON: Broadview Press, 2003. 857–902. ISBN 1-55111-581-6. $54.95 CDN.
- Olinda's Adventures, Or, the Amours of a Young Lady. New York: AMS Press Inc., 2004. ISBN 0-404-70138-8. $22.59 CDN.
- Fatal Friendship. A Tragedy in Morgan, Fidelis. The Female Wits: Women Playwrights on the London Stage, 1660–1720. London, Virago, 1981
- "Love at a Loss: or, Most Votes Carry It." in [Kendall] Love and Thunder: Plays by Women in the Age of Queen Anne. Methuen, 1988. ISBN 1170114326
- "Love at a Loss" and "The Revolution of Sweden", in ed. Derek Hughes, Eighteenth Century Women Playwrights, 6 vols, Pickering & Chatto: London, 2001, ISBN 1851966161. Vol.2 Mary Pix and Catharine Trotter, ed. Anne Kelley.
- Catharine Trotter's The Adventures of a Young Lady and Other Works, ed. Anne Kelley. Ashgate Publishing: Aldershot, 2006, ISBN 0 7546 0967 7
