= George Wilkins =

16th/17th-century English playwright and pamphleteer

George Wilkins (died 1618) was an English dramatist and pamphleteer best known for his possible collaboration with William Shakespeare on the play Pericles, Prince of Tyre. By profession he was an inn-keeper, but he was also apparently involved in criminal activities.

== Life ==
Wilkins was an inn-keeper in Cow-Cross, London, an area that was "notorious as a haunt of whores and thieves". Most biographical information about him derives from his regular appearance in criminal court records for thievery and acts of violence. Many of the charges against him involved violence against women, including kicking a pregnant woman in the belly, and knocking down and stomping another woman. The latter appears in other records as a known "bawd", or keeper of prostitutes. These facts have led to the suggestion that his inn functioned as a brothel and that Wilkins was a procurer, or pimp.

Wilkins was associated with the King's Men, and their chief playwright William Shakespeare, during the latter's last working years as a dramatist. Shakespeare and Wilkins were both witnesses in the case of Bellott v Mountjoy in 1612; in his deposition he described himself as a "victualler".

== Works ==
He is first heard of as the author of a pamphlet on the Three Miseries of Barbary, which dates from 1606. He then collaborated in 1607 with William Rowley and John Day in The Travels of the Three English Brothers, a dramatisation of the real-life adventures of the Sherley brothers.

In the same year Wilkins wrote The Miseries of Enforced Marriage. This play is based on the real life story of Walter Calverley, a Yorkshireman whose identity is thinly disguised under the name of "Scarborough". This man had killed his two children and had attempted to murder his wife. The play avoided a tragic ending, at least in the printed version of 1607, which ends in comedy. The story stopped short before the catastrophe perhaps because of objections raised by Mrs. Calverley's family, the Cobhams. Walter Calverley's crimes are dealt with in a short play, A Yorkshire Tragedy, of uncertain authorship.

== Pericles ==
A number of studies have attributed to Wilkins a share in Shakespeare's Pericles, Prince of Tyre (which does not appear in Shakespeare's First Folio, but was published only in a textually corrupt quarto). This may have been collaboration, or perhaps Wilkins was the original author of Pericles and Shakespeare remodelled it, or vice versa. However it may be, Wilkins published in 1608 a novel entitled The Painful Adventures of Pericles, Prynce of Tyre, described as "the true history of Pericles as it was lately presented by ... John Gower" (who serves as narrator in the play). This follows the play very closely. The editors of the 1986 Oxford Edition of Shakespeare make the assumption that Wilkins was the co-author of Pericles and draw heavily upon The Painful Adventures in their controversial reconstructed text of the play. Wilkins is thought to have contributed most of the first two acts of the play, while Shakespeare wrote the last three.

In his 2022 book Aemilia Lanyer as Shakespeare’s Co-Author, Mark Bradbeer suggests that George Wilkins might have been a pseudonym for the poet Emilia Lanier.
