= The Fair Jilt =

Book by Aphra Behn

- Montague Summers notes in The Works of Aphra Behn that after the first edition, "History" in the title was changed to "Amours."
- Author: Aphra Behn
- Original title: The Fair Jilt: or, the History of Prince Tarquin and Miranda
- Language: English
- Genre: prose tale
- Publication date: 1688
- Publication place: England

The Fair Jilt: or, the Amours of Prince Tarquin and Miranda is a short novella by Aphra Behn published by Will Canning in 1688, a year before Behn's death. The plot is loosely based around rumours Behn had heard regarding a story of Prince Francisco de Tarquini. Though Behn insisted that the story was true, it is sensationalized. The story follows a woman named Miranda who, slighted by the rejection of a priest, accuses him of rape. After Miranda marries Prince Tarquin, the story observes their series of deceptive acts and multiple murder attempts instigated by the passions of love and desire. The Fair Jilt occupies itself with themes of deceit, infatuation, and impassioned acts of love, common ideas within the amatory fiction genre. Behn herself introduces the story as a study of the destructive power of love.

== Background ==
Behn rose to prominence during a time of political unrest when the general public began to question the idea of monarchy. She was known as an avid Tory which is associated with the “politics of patriarchalism” and support of the original monarchy. Behn's Toryism came after the reign of the Cromwells and the conflict between the Puritans and the Royalists. Even though Behn's Toryism shows in her writings, she often showed female characters as more clever or intelligent than the male characters. This concept is not in line with a traditional Tory view since Toryism stands on the grounds of supporting a strong patriarchy.

In The Fair Jilt, Miranda outsmarts the male characters by scheming in order to get her way on several occasions, such as convincing Tarquin to kill her sister or accusing Henrick of rape. Behn allows Miranda to explore her abilities as a strong female character, in contrast to the typical rigid separation of masculinity and femininity under Toryism. By the end of The Fair Jilt, Miranda still falls victim to a more traditional role. Through this resolution, Behn humbles her character and reverts to supporting the more patriarchal views that she was known for politically.

The story is dedicated to "Henry Pain, Esq.", also known as Henry Neville Payne, a Roman Catholic agitator who was later arrested and tortured for his involvement in the Montgomery Plot of 1689.

Behn claims that the story is true and that she witnessed much of it herself. Editor Montague Summers writes in his introduction to The Works of Aphra Behn (1915) that the story is only loosely based on actual events: "With all the nice skill of a born novelist she has so mingled fact and fancy, what did occur and what might have been, that any attempt to disentangle the twain would be idle indeed." There was in fact a Prince Francisco de Tarquini who attempted to murder his sister-in-law but was spared death in 1666 after the executioner's initial stroke failed to kill him. The London Gazette reported that the prince was only slightly wounded due to a mistake by the executioner, and was subsequently pardoned.

== Plot ==
Young Miranda lives in a convent of Begines, an order of "galloping nuns" who take only temporary vows. Her parents are dead and her younger sister, Alcidiana, lives with an uncle. The seeming unattainability of the Begines makes them more desirable to men, and Miranda is beautiful, accomplished, and wealthy. She has many admirers, and receives their gifts and attention with pleasure, while loving none of them. One day she meets Henrick, a handsome young prince who has taken monastic vows and changed his name to Francisco. Miranda's maid tells her about Henrick's tragic past in a story within a story. Miranda becomes infatuated with Henrick, but he rejects her advances. In response, she accuses him of rape and has him thrown in prison.

Soon afterwards, Miranda meets Prince Tarquin and the two marry, but Miranda's extravagant lifestyle soon sees her wealth greatly reduced. She invites her sister, Alcidiana, to move in, so that she can pilfer from her funds. To keep a hold over her sister, she rebuffs all of her sister's suitors until Alcidiana moves out. Miranda then sends a servant to poison Alcidiana, which he does, but Alcidiana does not die and the servant reveals Miranda's plan to the authorities. The servant is hanged, and Miranda, due to her position, is only shamed, though a great sum of money is owed to Alcidiana and Tarquin is ordered to pay it by the court. Miranda convinces Tarquin to kill her sister, and he attempts to shoot her. He is caught, confesses, and is sent to be beheaded, but the executioner misses the mark and hits Tarquin's shoulder instead, causing severe injury. Tarquin is released, and he and Miranda leave the country. In the closing lines, it is noted that Miranda eventually repents her sinful past and that Tarquin has since died, though no explanation is offered for his death.

== Style ==
Behn portrays the narrator as their own character through asides containing biased descriptions. Through these asides and throughout the novel, the narrator responds to the events unfolding by both condemning and sympathizing with them. The narrator is distinguished by following a trend of adopting a level of anonymity and secrecy that mirrors the reality in which Aphra Behn was writing her, often perceived as, sordid secret histories. This ambiguous spectator serves the specific narrational purpose of delving into and exploring what happens in private and making public the secret interpersonal affairs of the characters. The narrator also functions as Behn's voice by adding a distinctive commentary on conventions within fiction by specifically addressing passion. She follows the themes of other amatory fiction authors by neither disparaging or encouraging it. These rhetorical devices distinguish Behn's writing from other writers of her time, and had a distinct influence and inspiration upon other authors such as Eliza Haywood.

== Major themes ==
=== Crime, punishment, and morality ===
British professor Janet Todd asserts that many parts of The Fair Jilt reflect Behn's royalist politics as the tale is loosely based on the marriage of François Louis Tarquini and Maria Theresia Van Mechelen and the attempted murder of Van Mechelen's sister, Anna Louisa. In the novella, Tarquin, a prince with dubious royal credentials, is manipulated by Miranda, possibly representative of Behn's interpretation of this marriage and criminal case. Todd's condensed account of this gory history of attempted murder, avarice, and a botched execution falls short of accurately capturing the intricacy of the criminal case or cases that caused such a stir in Antwerp in the middle of the seventeenth century.

Professors J.P. Vander Motten and René Vermeir argue that within the Fair Jilt, Behn often uses the reader's sympathy for the characters against them, causing the reader to morally condemn them. The two argue that this can be seen best "By leaving Alcidiana at the mercy of her ruthless sibling". Additionally, Todd claims that Miranda avoids justice for various crimes within The Fair Jilt, calling into question the themes of punishment and morality, for her original sexual desire soon leads to a desire for power. This in turn is said to lead her to a "perfect state of happiness". Todd names this as a "moral disintegration" connected to the politics of Behn and her time, claiming this inversion of justice represents Behn's opinions on the Glorious Revolution. This morality is challenged by Behn's writings near the end of the Restoration, which emphasizes subjectivity through sexual desire. The author's ethics here describes a woman's desire as aware, powerful, and bound in knowledge of the self, which ultimately comes off as unruly desire.

=== The power of love ===
As evidenced from the opening paragraph, love in the world of The Fair Jilt is immensely powerful for both good and bad. The case of Tarquin illustrates the negative impacts of the power of love: he is deeply infatuated with Miranda, willingly allowing her to use him as a tool in her varying schemes. He even ultimately takes the punishment for her, only narrowly escaping death due to a botched execution, because he is so enamored with her.

Outside of Tarquin's character, Behn writes about love as something empowering. Although many of Miranda's actions are undeniably questionable, she uses sex and attraction towards her to her advantage, allowing her to get away with (or at least attempt) her various plans. This was the beginning of what would become typical in women's amatory fiction: an exploration of female sexuality, love, and power.

=== Gender ideologies ===
In The Fair Jilt, Behn creates complex representations of gender largely by subverting traditionally gendered expectations for behavior. The character of Miranda is immoral, decisive and promiscuous, in contrast with the obedient and chaste ideals she'd typically be expected to embody. Furthermore, Behn juxtaposes this characterization of Miranda with various submissive and moral men. Critics argue that Miranda's manipulation and domination of these men not only empowers the feminine, but satirizes the masculine, by placing Miranda as the pursuer, and men as the pursued.

Other critics have argued that the female narrator further complicates the depictions of gender dynamics in The Fair Jilt by both moralizing against and empathizing with Miranda's actions. The narrator's tone often undermines moral condemnation, not fully endorsing the moral system Miranda is violating, nor challenging that system's existence. By giving control of the narrative to a female voice with questionable morals and values, scholars say Behn raises conversations about the true intentions of complex female characters and the legitimacy of their prescribed roles.

== Critical reception ==
According to Maureen Duffy, The Fair Jilt damaged Behn's reputation unjustly. Many readers found the story so hard to believe that they assumed it was fabricated, despite her insistence that it was true.

Although a villainess, Behn's Miranda is not as repellent as the shockingly unhygienic Cornelia in The London Jilt. For this reason, Bonnie Blackwell credits The Fair Jilt, along with other works by female authors, with giving the word "jilt" a more positive connotation than it had in the past.
