= The Amorous Prince, or, The Curious Husband =

Play written by Aphra Behn

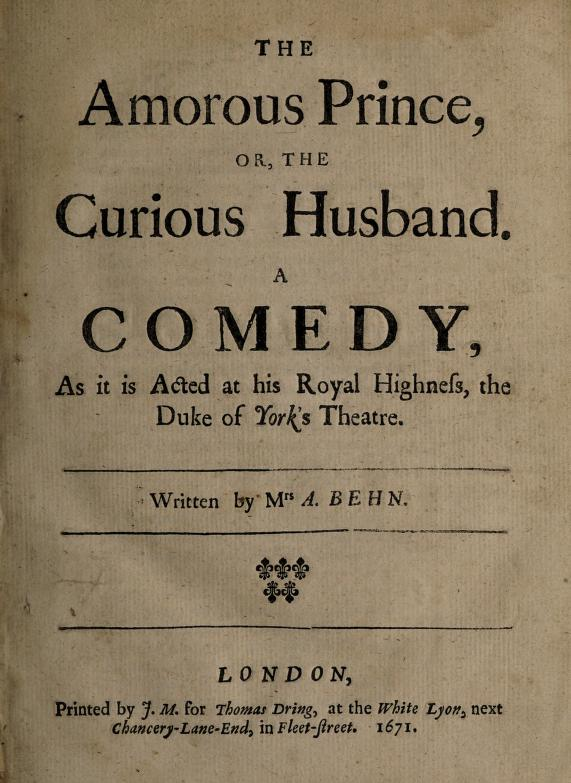
- Original language: English
- Written by: Aphra Behn
- Genre: Comedy

Premiere
- Date: 1671

The Amorous Prince, or The Curious Husband is a Restoration comedy written by Aphra Behn and first performed in 1671. It was her second play and represents an early example of her bold exploration of gender roles, sexuality, and power dynamics in 17th-century England. Despite its initial performance, the play fell into obscurity for centuries until recent revivals brought it back to public attention.

== Plot ==
Set in Florence, The Amorous Prince intertwines two main storylines. The first centers on Prince Frederick, whose sense of entitlement drives him to pursue women regardless of social consequences. His romantic escapades include Cloris, the sister of his best friend Curtius, and Laura, Curtius's fiancée. Frederick's actions highlight themes of toxic masculinity and aristocratic decadence.

The second storyline follows Antonio, the "Curious Husband", who devises a scheme to test his wife Clarina's fidelity. However, Clarina outsmarts him with the help of her sister-in-law Ismena. Mistaken identities and clever counterplots ensue as female characters exercise significant agency, challenging societal norms about gender and virtue.

== Themes ==
Behn's play challenges patriarchal norms through strong female characters who defy expectations and manipulate situations to their advantage. It also critiques the double standards of aristocratic society regarding sexuality and virtue, particularly through Frederick's treatment of women.

Disguises and misunderstandings drive much of the comedic intrigue, including Cloris dressing as a boy and Ismena impersonating Clarina. Another prevailing theme is women's agency. Female characters like Clarina and Ismena demonstrate wit and resourcefulness, often outmaneuvering male counterparts.

== Significance ==
Aphra Behn was one of the first English women to earn a living as a playwright. Her works often satirized aristocracy and challenged societal norms. The Amorous Prince is notable for featuring a "breeches part", where a female actor dressed as a man—a subversive choice shortly after women were allowed on stage following the Restoration. Behn's inclusion of this element highlighted her progressive approach to gender representation.

The play also reflects Behn's life experiences; she worked as a political spy under King Charles II, which informed her nuanced understanding of intrigue and deception.

== Reception and revival ==
Upon its debut in 1671, The Amorous Prince was considered controversial for its candid portrayal of sexuality and gender dynamics. Its bold themes likely contributed to its disappearance from theaters for over 350 years. However, recent productions have rediscovered its relevance by modernizing its setting while retaining its critique of societal norms.

The play has been described as the "#MeToo play" of the 17th century for its exploration of toxic masculinity and female empowerment. Contemporary revivals have emphasized these themes, resonating with modern audiences.
