= Aphra Behn =

English playwright, poet and spy (1640–1689)

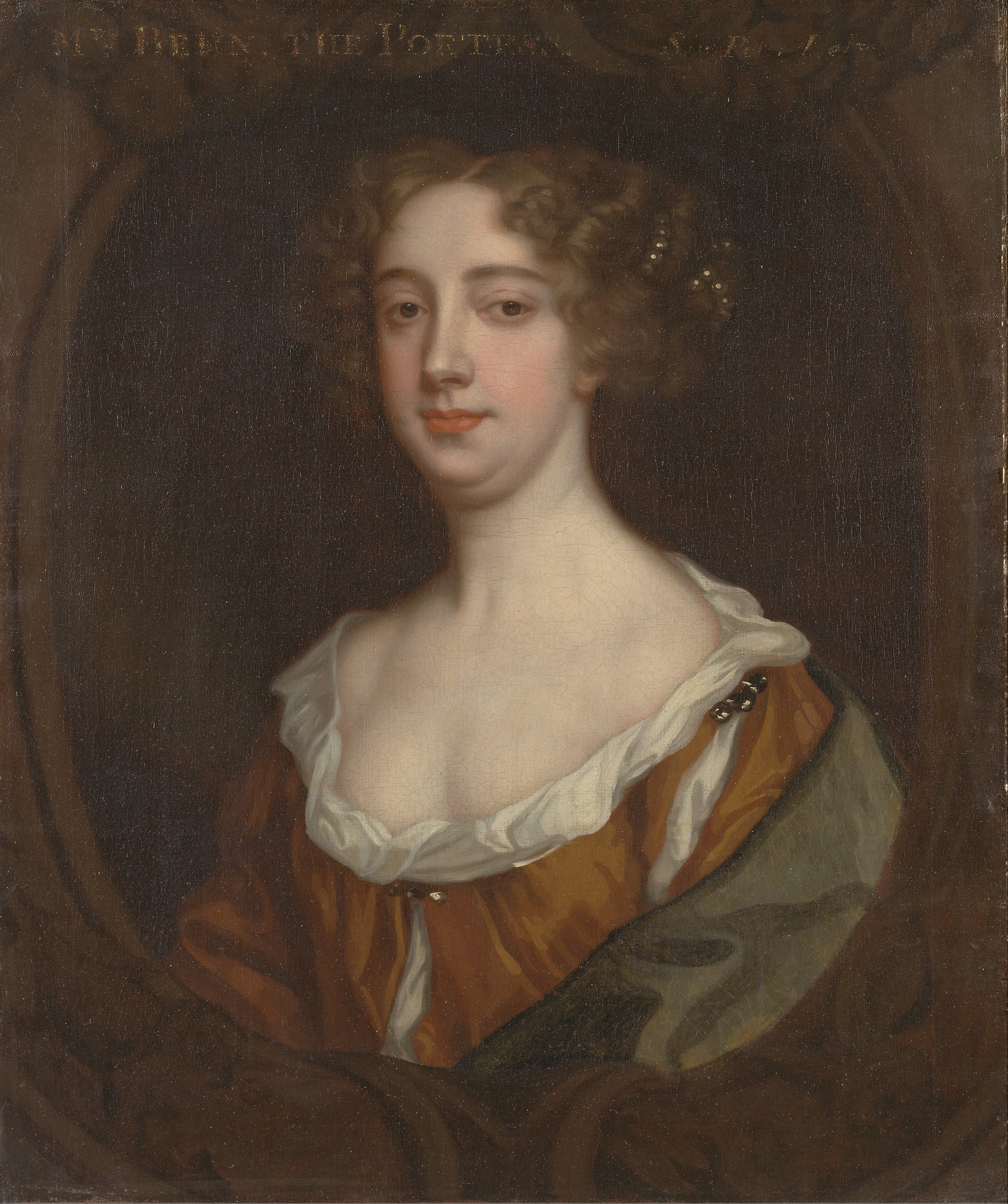
- Portrait by Sir Peter Lely, c. 1670
- Born: Aphra Johnson; Canterbury, Kent, England
- Baptised: 14 December 1640
- Died: 16 April 1689 (aged 48); London, England
- Resting place: Westminster Abbey
- Occupations: Playwright, poet, prose writer, translator, spy
- Writing career
- Spouse: Johan Behn (m. 1664)
- Language: Early Modern English
- Years active: 1664–1689
- Genres: Novel, roman a clef
- Notable works: Oroonoko; The Rover; Love-Letters Between a Nobleman and His Sister
- Movements: Restoration literature, Restoration comedy
- Website: aphrabehn.org

Aphra Behn (/ˈæfrə bɛn/; (Note: She inherited this name from her German husband; the German pronunciation is German pronunciation: [beːn].) bapt. 14 December 1640 – 16 April 1689) was an English playwright, poet, prose writer and translator from the Restoration era. As one of the first English women to earn her living by her writing, she broke cultural barriers and served as a literary role model for later generations of women authors. Rising from obscurity, she came to the notice of Charles II, who employed her as a spy in Antwerp. Upon her return to London and a probable brief stay in debtors' prison, she began writing for the stage. She belonged to a coterie of poets and famous libertines such as John Wilmot, Lord Rochester. Behn wrote under the pastoral pseudonym Astrea. During the turbulent political times of the Exclusion Crisis, she wrote an epilogue and prologue that brought her legal trouble; she thereafter devoted most of her writing to prose genres and translations. A staunch supporter of the Stuart line, Behn declined an invitation from Bishop Burnet to write a welcoming poem to the new king William III. She died shortly after.

She is remembered in Virginia Woolf's A Room of One's Own: "All women together ought to let flowers fall upon the tomb of Aphra Behn which is, most scandalously but rather appropriately, in Westminster Abbey, for it was she who earned them the right to speak their minds." Her grave is not included in the Poets' Corner but lies in the East Cloister near the steps to the church.

Her best-known works are Oroonoko: or, the Royal Slave, sometimes described as an early novel, and the play The Rover.

== Life and work ==
=== Versions of her early life ===
Information regarding Behn's life is scant, especially regarding her early years. This may be due to intentional obscuring on Behn's part. One version of Behn's life tells that she was born to a barber named John Amis and his wife Amy; she is occasionally referred to as Aphra Amis Behn. Another story has Behn born to a couple named Cooper. The Histories and Novels of the Late Ingenious Mrs. Behn (1696) states that Behn was born to Bartholomew Johnson, a barber, and Elizabeth Denham, a wet-nurse. Colonel Thomas Colepeper, the only person who claimed to have known her as a child, wrote in Adversaria that she was born at "Sturry or Canterbury" (Note: Sturry is a small village a few miles north-east of the city of Canterbury in Kent.) to a Mr Johnson and that she had a sister named Frances. Another contemporary, Anne Finch, wrote that Behn was born in Wye in Kent, the "Daughter to a Barber". In some accounts the profile of her father fits Eaffrey Johnson. Although not much is known about her early childhood, one of her biographers, Janet Todd, believes that the common religious upbringing at the time could have heavily influenced much of her work. She argued that, throughout Behn's writings, her experiences in church were not of religious fervour, but instead chances for her to explore her sexual desires, desires that will later be shown through her plays. In one of her last plays she writes, "I have been at the Chapel; and seen so many Beaus, such a Number of Plumeys, I cou'd not tell which I shou'd look on the most...".

Another version of her life says she was born as Aphra Johnson, daughter to Bartholomew and Elizabeth Johnson of Harbledown in Kent; her brother Edward died when he was six and a half years old. She is said to have been betrothed to a man named John Halse in 1657. It is suggested that this association with the Halse family is what gave her family the colonial connections that allowed them to travel to Suriname. Her correspondence with William Scot, son of parliamentarian Thomas Scot, in the 1660s seems to corroborate her stories of her time in the American colony.

=== Education ===
Although Behn's writings show some form of education, it is not clear how she obtained the education that she did. It was somewhat taboo for women at the time to receive a formal education, Janet Todd notes. Although some aristocratic girls in the past had been able to receive some form of education, that was most likely not the case for Aphra Behn, based on the time she lived. Self-tuition was practised by European women during the 17th century, but it relied on the parents to allow that to happen. She most likely spent time copying poems and other writings, which not only inspired her but educated her. Aphra was not alone in her quest of self-tuition during this time period, and there are other notable women, such as the first female medical doctor Dorothea Leporin who made efforts to self-educate. In some of her plays, Aphra Behn shows disdain towards this English ideal of not educating women formally. She also, though, seemed to believe that learning Greek and Latin, two of the classical languages at the time, was not as important as many authors thought it to be. She may have been influenced by another writer named Francis Kirkman who also lacked knowledge of Greek or Latin, who said "you shall not find my English, Greek, here; nor hard cramping Words, such as will stop you in the middle of your Story to consider what is meant by them...". Later in life, Aphra would make similar gestures to ideas revolving around formal education.

Behn was born during the buildup of the English Civil War, a child of the political tensions of the time. One version of Behn's story has her travelling with a Bartholomew Johnson to the small English colony of Surinam (later captured by the Dutch). He was said to die on the journey, with his wife and children spending some months in the country, though there is no evidence of this. During this trip Behn said she met an African slave leader, whose story formed the basis for one of her most famous works, Oroonoko. It is possible that she acted as a spy in the colony. There is little verifiable evidence to confirm any one story. In Oroonoko, Behn gives herself the position of narrator and her first biographer accepted the assumption that Behn was the daughter of the lieutenant general of Surinam, as in the story. There is little evidence that this was the case, and none of her contemporaries acknowledge any aristocratic status. Her correspondence with Thomas Scot during the time of her stay in Surinam seems to provide evidence for her stay there. Also, later in her career when she found herself facing financial troubles in the Netherlands, her mother is said to have had audience with the King in an attempt to secure Aphra's way home, implying there may have been some form of connection with aristocracy, however small. There is also no evidence that Oroonoko existed as an actual person or that any such slave revolt, as is featured in the story, really happened.

Writer Germaine Greer has called Behn "a palimpsest; she has scratched herself out," and biographer Janet Todd noted that Behn "has a lethal combination of obscurity, secrecy and staginess which makes her an uneasy fit for any narrative, speculative or factual. She is not so much a woman to be unmasked as an unending combination of masks". Her name is not mentioned in tax or church records. During her lifetime she was also known as Ann Behn, Mrs Behn, agent 160 and Astrea.

=== Career ===
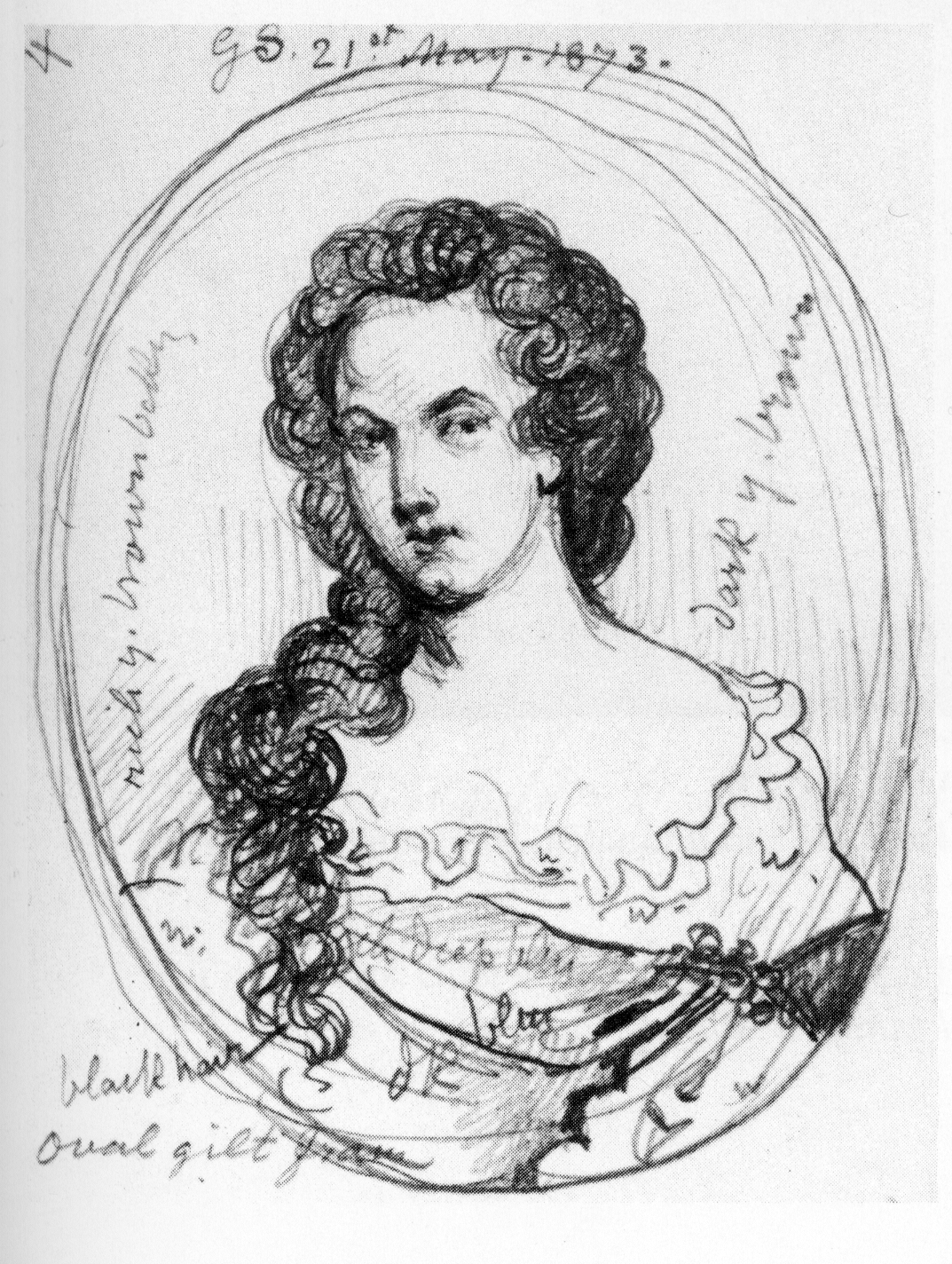
A sketch of Aphra Behn by George Scharf from a portrait believed to be lost (1873)

Shortly after her supposed return to England from Surinam in 1664, Behn may have married Johan Behn (also written as Johann and John Behn). He may have been a merchant of German or Dutch extraction, possibly from Hamburg. He died or the couple separated soon after 1664; however, from this point the writer used "Mrs Behn" as her professional name. In correspondence, she occasionally signed her name as Behne or Beane.

Behn may have had a Catholic upbringing. She once commented that she was "designed for a nun," and the fact that she had so many Catholic connections, such as Henry Neville who was later arrested for his Catholicism, would have aroused suspicions during the anti-Catholic fervour of the 1680s. She was a monarchist, and her sympathy for the Stuarts, and particularly for the Catholic Duke of York may be demonstrated by her dedication of her play The Second Part of the Rover to him after he had been exiled for the second time. Behn was dedicated to the restored King Charles II. As political parties emerged during this time, Behn became a Tory supporter.

By 1666, Behn had become attached to the court, possibly through the influence of Thomas Culpeper and other associates. She has also been placed in Westminster, in lodgings close to Sir Philip Howard of Naworth, supporting the idea that it was his connections to John Halsall and Duke Ablemarle that led to her eventual mission in the Netherlands. The Second Anglo-Dutch War had broken out between England and the Netherlands in 1665, and she was recruited as a political spy in Antwerp on behalf of King Charles II, possibly under the auspices of courtier Thomas Killigrew. This is the first well-documented account we have of her activities. Her code name is said to have been Astrea, a name under which she later published many of her writings. Her chief role was to establish an intimacy with William Scot, son of Thomas Scot, a regicide who had been executed in 1660. Scot was believed to be ready to become a spy in the English service and to report on the doings of the English exiles who were plotting against the King. Behn arrived in Bruges in July 1666, probably with two others, as London was wracked with plague and fire. Behn's job was to turn Scot into a double agent, but there is evidence that Scot betrayed her to the Dutch.

Behn's exploits were not profitable, however; the cost of living shocked her, and she was left unprepared. One month after arrival, she pawned her jewellery. King Charles was slow in paying (if he paid at all), either for her services or for her expenses whilst abroad. Money had to be borrowed so that Behn could return to London, where a year's petitioning of Charles for payment was unsuccessful. It may be that she was never paid by the crown. A warrant was issued for her arrest, but there is no evidence it was served or that she went to prison for her debt, though apocryphally it is often given as part of her history.

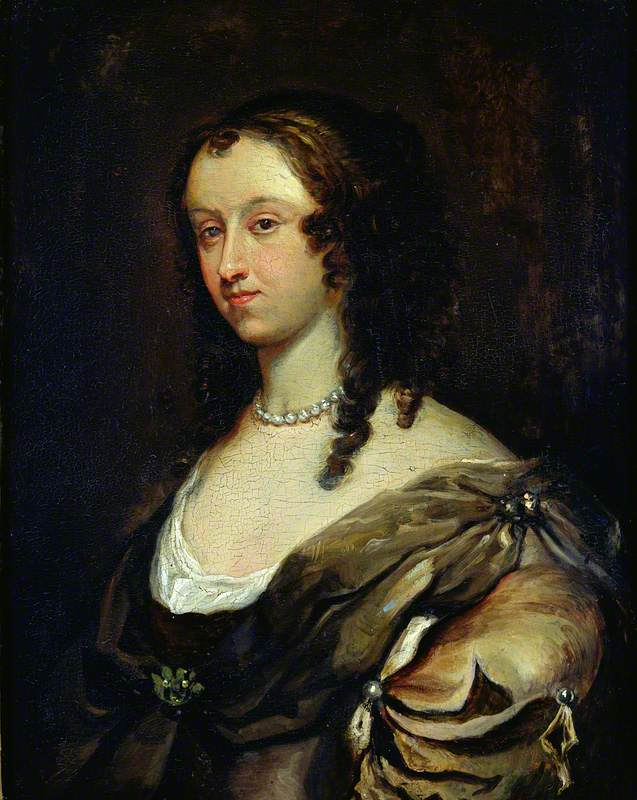
Portrait by Mary Beale

Forced by debt and her husband's death, Behn began to work for the King's Company and the Duke's Company players as a scribe. She had, however, written poetry up until this point. While she is recorded to have written before she adopted her debt, John Palmer said in a review of her works that, "Mrs. Behn wrote for a livelihood. Playwriting was her refuge from starvation and a debtor's prison." The theatres that had been closed under Cromwell were now re-opening under Charles II, plays enjoying a revival. Under Charles, prevailing Puritan ethics were reversed in the fashionable society of London. The King associated with playwrights that poured scorn on marriage and the idea of consistency in love. Among the King's favourites was the Earl of Rochester John Wilmot, who became famous for his cynical libertinism.

In 1613 Lady Elizabeth Cary had published The Tragedy of Miriam, in the 1650s Margaret Cavendish published two volumes of plays, and in 1663 a translation of Corneille's Pompey by Katherine Philips was performed in Dublin and London. Women had been excluded from performing on the public stage before the English Civil War, but in Restoration England professional actresses played the women's parts. In 1668, plays by women began to be staged in London.

Behn's first play The Forc'd Marriage was a romantic tragicomedy on arranged marriages and was staged by the Duke's Company in September 1670. The performance ran for six nights, which was regarded as a good run for an unknown author. Six months later Behn's play The Amorous Prince was successfully staged. Again, Behn used the play to comment on the harmful effects of arranged marriages. Behn did not hide the fact that she was a woman, instead she made a point of it. When in 1673 the Dorset Garden Theatre staged The Dutch Lover, critics sabotaged the play on the grounds that the author was a woman. Behn tackled the critics head on in Epistle to the Reader. She argued that women had been held back by their unjust exclusion from education, not their lack of ability. Critics of Behn were provided with ammunition because of her public liaison with John Hoyle, a bisexual lawyer who scandalised his contemporaries.

After her third play, The Dutch Lover, failed, Behn falls off the public record for three years. It is speculated that she went travelling again, possibly in her capacity as a spy. She gradually moved towards comic works, which proved more commercially successful, publishing four plays in close succession. In 1676–77, she published Abdelazer, The Town-Fopp and The Rover. In early 1678 Sir Patient Fancy was published. This succession of box-office successes led to frequent attacks on Behn. She was attacked for her private life, the morality of her plays was questioned and she was accused of plagiarising The Rover. Behn countered these public attacks in the prefaces of her published plays. In the preface to Sir Patient Fancy she argued that she was being singled out because she was a woman, while male playwrights were free to live the most scandalous lives and write bawdy plays.

By the late 1670s Behn was among the leading playwrights of England. During the 1670s and 1680s she was one of the most productive playwrights in Britain, second only to Poet Laureate John Dryden. Her plays were staged frequently and attended by the King. Behn became friends with notable writers of the day, including John Dryden, Elizabeth Barry, John Hoyle, Thomas Otway and Edward Ravenscroft, and was acknowledged as a part of the circle of the Earl of Rochester. The Rover became a favourite at the King's court.

Because Charles II had no heir, a prolonged political crisis ensued. Behn became heavily involved in the political debate about the succession. Mass hysteria commenced as in 1678 the rumoured Popish Plot suggested the King should be replaced with his Roman Catholic brother James. Political parties developed, the Whigs wanted to exclude James, while the Tories did not believe succession should be altered in any way. Behn supported the Tory position and in the two years between 1681 and 1682 produced five plays to discredit the Whigs. Behn often used her writings to attack the parliamentary Whigs claiming, "In public spirits call'd, good o' th' Commonwealth... So tho' by different ways the fever seize...in all 'tis one and the same mad disease." This was Behn's reproach to parliament which had denied the king funds. The London audience, mainly Tory sympathisers, attended the plays in large numbers. But a warrant was issued for Behn's arrest on the order of King Charles II when she criticized James Scott, Duke of Monmouth, the illegitimate son of the King, in the epilogue to the anonymously published Romulus and Hersilia (1682). Charles II eventually dissolved the Cavalier Parliament and James II succeeded him in 1685.

=== Final years and death ===
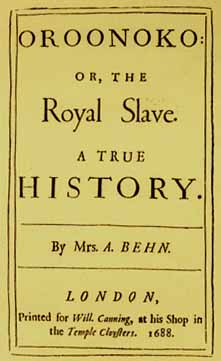
Title page of the first edition of Oroonoko (1688)

Behn staged The Luckey Chance in 1686. In response to the criticism levelled at the play, she articulated a long and passionate defence of women writers in the preface of the play when it was published in the following year. Her play The Emperor of the Moon was staged and published in 1687; it became one of her longest-running plays.

In the 1680s, she began to publish prose. Her first prose work might have been the three-part Love-Letters Between a Nobleman and His Sister, anonymously published between 1684 and 1687. The novels were inspired by a contemporary scandal, which saw Lord Grey elope with his sister-in-law Lady Henrietta Berkeley. At the time of publication, Love-Letters was very popular and eventually went through more than 16 editions before 1800.

She published five prose works under her own name: La Montre: or, the Lover's Watch (1686), The Fair Jilt (1688), Oroonoko: or, The Royal Slave (1688), The History of the Nun (1689) and The Lucky Mistake (1689). Oroonoko, her best-known prose work, was published less than a year before her death. It is the story of the enslaved Oroonoko and his love Imoinda, possibly based on Behn's travel to Surinam twenty years earlier.

Behn composed Oenone to Paris, a reworking of Ovid's Heroides, for John Dryden and Jacob Tonson's collection Ovid's Epistles Translated by Several Hands, published in 1680. Unlike other entries to the collection, Behn significantly deviated from her source, incorporating motives from more of Ovid's epistles, and offering a more sympathetic portrayal of Oenone than is found in Ovid or other retellings of the myth. Behn's free style of translation led to attacks by her contemporaries, most notably Matthew Prior, who famously referred to her as 'blind Translatress Behn' in a markedly misogynistic critique of the work. As the collection's only female contributor, Behn's involvement in Ovid's Epistles presents an unusual incursion into the male-dominated field of classical translation, and it has been suggested that her contribution paved the way for more women to produce their own translations of the classics.

She also translated from the French, publishing translations of Tallement, La Rochefoucauld, Fontenelle and Brilhac. The two translations of Fontenelle's work were: A Discovery of New Worlds (Entretiens sur la pluralité des mondes), a popularisation of astronomy written as a novel in a form similar to her own work, but with her new, religiously oriented preface; and The History of Oracles (Histoire des Oracles). She translated Brilhac's Agnes de Castro. In her final days, she translated "Of Trees" ("Sylva"), the sixth and final book of Abraham Cowley's Six Books of Plants (Plantarum libri sex).

She died on 16 April 1689, and was buried in the East Cloister of Westminster Abbey. The inscription on her tombstone reads: "Here lies a Proof that Wit can never be Defence enough against Mortality." She was quoted as stating that she had led a "life dedicated to pleasure and poetry."

== Legacy and re-evaluation ==
Following Behn's death, new female dramatists such as Delarivier Manley, Mary Pix, Susanna Centlivre and Catherine Trotter acknowledged Behn as their most vital predecessor, who opened up public space for women writers. Three posthumous collections of her prose, including a number of previously unpublished pieces attributed to her, were published by the bookseller Samuel Briscoe: The Histories and Novels of the Late Ingenious Mrs. Behn (1696), All the Histories and Novels Written by the Late Ingenious Mrs. Behn (1698) and Histories, Novels, and Translations Written by the Most Ingenious Mrs. Behn (1700). Greer considers Briscoe to have been an unreliable source and it's possible that not all of these works were written by Behn.

Until the mid-20th century Behn was repeatedly dismissed as a morally depraved minor writer and her literary work was marginalised and often dismissed outright. In the 18th century her literary work was scandalised as lewd by Thomas Brown, William Wycherley, Richard Steele and John Duncombe. Alexander Pope penned the famous lines "The stage how loosely does Astrea tread, Who fairly puts all characters to bed!". In the 19th century Mary Hays, Matilda Betham, Alexander Dyce, Jane Williams and Julia Kavanagh decided that Behn's writings were unfit to read, because they were corrupt and deplorable. Algernon Swinburne quotes her poetry with respect in his Essay on Blake (1866). She also attracted positive responses from Leigh Hunt, William Forsyth and William Henry Hudson.

The life and times of Behn were recounted by a long line of biographers, among them Dyce, Edmund Gosse, Ernest Bernbaum, Montague Summers, Vita Sackville-West, Virginia Woolf, George Woodcock, William J. Cameron and Frederick Link.

Of Behn's considerable literary output only Oroonoko was seriously considered by literary scholars. This book, published in 1688, is regarded as one of the first abolitionist and humanitarian novels published in the English language. In 1696 it was adapted for the stage by Thomas Southerne and continuously performed throughout the 18th century. In 1745 the novel was translated into French, going through seven French editions. It is credited as precursor to Jean-Jaques Rousseau's Discourses on Inequality.

In 1915, Montague Summers, an author of scholarly works on the English drama of the 17th century, published a six-volume collection of her work, in hopes of rehabilitating her reputation. Summers was fiercely passionate about the work of Behn and found himself incredibly devoted to the appreciation of 17th century literature.

Since the 1970s Behn's literary works have been re-evaluated by feminist critics and writers. Behn was rediscovered as a significant female writer by Maureen Duffy, Angeline Goreau, Ruth Perry, Hilda Lee Smith, Moira Ferguson, Jane Spencer, Dale Spender, Elaine Hobby and Janet Todd. This led to the reprinting of her works. The Rover was republished in 1967, Oroonoko was republished in 1973, Love Letters between a Nobleman and His Sister was published again in 1987 and The Lucky Chance was reprinted in 1988. Felix Schelling wrote in The Cambridge History of English Literature, that she was "a very gifted woman, compelled to write for bread in an age in which literature... catered habitually to the lowest and most depraved of human inclinations," and that, "Her success depended upon her ability to write like a man." Edmund Gosse remarked that she was, "...the George Sand of the Restoration".

The criticism of Behn's poetry focuses on the themes of gender, sexuality, femininity, pleasure, and love. A feminist critique tends to focus on Behn's inclusion of female pleasure and sexuality in her poetry, which was a radical concept at the time she was writing. Like her contemporary male libertines, she wrote freely about sex. In the famous poem "The Disappointment" she wrote a comic account of male impotence from a woman's perspective. Critics Lisa Zeitz and Peter Thoms contend that the poem "playfully and wittily questions conventional gender roles and the structures of oppression which they support". One critic, Alison Conway, views Behn as instrumental to the formation of modern thought around the female gender and sexuality: "Behn wrote about these subjects before the technologies of sexuality we now associate were in place, which is, in part, why she proves so hard to situate in the trajectories most familiar to us". Virginia Woolf wrote, in A Room of One's Own:

All women together, ought to let flowers fall upon the grave of Aphra Behn... for it was she who earned them the right to speak their minds... Behn proved that money could be made by writing at the sacrifice, perhaps, of certain agreeable qualities; and so by degrees writing became not merely a sign of folly and a distracted mind but was of practical importance.

A statue to Canterbury born Aphra Behn was unveiled on 25 February 2025. In partnership with local organisations, Canterbury Christ Church University announced, in September 2023, plans for a year long celebration of Behn's connection to Canterbury which would involve talks, a one-woman show, walks, and exhibitions, some hosted within the Canterbury Festival.

== Works ==
=== Plays ===
- The Forc'd Marriage (performed 1670; published 1671)
- The Amorous Prince (1671)
- The Dutch Lover (1673)
- Abdelazer (performed 1676; published 1677)
- The Town-Fopp (1676)
- The Debauchee (1677), an adaptation, attribution disputed
- The Rover (1677)
- The Counterfeit Bridegroom (1677), attribution disputed
- Sir Patient Fancy (1678)
- The Feign'd Curtizans (1679)
- The Young King (performed 1679; published 1683)
- The Revenge (1680), an adaptation, attribution disputed
- The Second Part of the Rover (performed 1680; published 1681)
- The False Count (performed 1681; published 1682)
- The Roundheads (performed 1681; published 1682)
- The City-Heiress (1682)
- Like Father, Like Son (1682), lost play
- Prologue and epilogue to anonymously published Romulus and Hersilia (1682)
- The Luckey Chance (performed 1686; published 1687)
- The Emperor of the Moon (1687)

Plays posthumously published

- The Widdow Ranter (performed 1689; published 1690)
- The Younger Brother, or, the Amorous Jilt (1696)

=== Poems and poetry collections ===
- Poems upon Several Occasions (1684)
- Miscellany, Being a Collection of Poems by Several Hands (1685)
- A Miscellany of New Poems by Several Hands (1688)
- A Congratulatory Poem to Her Sacred Majesty Queen Mary, upon Her Arrival in England (1689)

=== Prose ===
- Love-Letters Between a Nobleman and His Sister (1684–1687), published anonymously in three parts, attribution disputed
- La Montre: or, the Lover's Watch (1686), loose translation/adaptation of a novel by Bonnecorse
- The Fair Jilt (1688)
- Oroonoko (1688)
- The History of the Nun: or, the Fair Vow-Breaker (1689)
- The Lucky Mistake (1689)

Prose posthumously published, attribution disputed

- The Adventure of the Black Lady
- The Court of the King of Bantam
- The Unfortunate Bride
- The Unfortunate Happy Lady
- The Unhappy Mistake
- The Wandring Beauty

=== Translations ===
- Ovid: "A Paraphrase on Oenone to Paris", in John Dryden's and Jacob Tonson's Ovid's Epistles (1680).
- Paul Tallement: A Voyage to the Island of Love (1684), published with Poems upon Several Occasions. Translation of Voyage de l'isle d'amour.
- La Rochefoucauld: Reflections on Morality, or, Seneca Unmasqued (1685), published with Miscellany, Being a Collection of Poems by Several Hands. Translation of Réflexions ou sentences et maximes morale (1675 edition)
- Paul Tallement: Lycidus; or, the Lover in Fashion (1688), published with A Miscellany of New Poems by Several Hands. Translation of Le Second voyage de l'isle d'amour.
- Fontenelle: The History of Oracles (1688). Translation of Histoire des Oracles.
- Fontenelle: A Discovery of New Worlds (1688). Translation of Entretiens sur la pluralité des mondes (1688)
- Jean-Baptiste de Brilhac: Agnes de Castro, or, the Force of Generous Love (1688). Translation of Agnes de Castro, Nouvelle Portugaise (1688)
- Abraham Cowley: "Of Trees" ("Sylva"), in Six Books of Plants (1689). Translation of the sixth book of Plantarum libri sex (1668).

== In popular culture ==
Behn's life has been adapted for the stage in the 2014 play Empress of the Moon: The Lives of Aphra Behn by Chris Braak, and the 2015 play [exit Mrs Behn] or, The Leo Play by Christopher VanderArk. She is one of the characters in the 2010 play Or, by Liz Duffy Adams. Behn appears as a character in Daniel O'Mahony's Newtons Sleep, in Philip José Farmer's The Magic Labyrinth and Gods of Riverworld, in Molly Brown's Invitation to a Funeral (1999), in Susanna Gregory's "Blood On The Strand", and in Diana Norman's The Vizard Mask. She is referred to in Patrick O'Brian's novel Desolation Island. Liz Duffy Adams produced Or,, a 2009 play about her life. The 2019 Big Finish Short Trip audio play The Astrea Conspiracy features Behn alongside The Doctor, voiced by actress Neve McIntosh. In recognition of her pioneering role in women's literature, Behn was featured during the "Her Story" video tribute to notable women on U2's North American tour in 2017 for the 30th anniversary of The Joshua Tree.

== Biographies and other writings ==
- Croft, Susan ed. (2019). Classic Plays by Women. London: Aurora Metro Books. ISBN 9781906582005. Features "The Rover".
- Duffy, Maureen (1977). The Passionate Shepherdess. The first wholly scholarly new biography of Behn; the first to identify Behn's birth name.
- Goreau, Angeline (1980). Reconstructing Aphra: a social biography of Aphra Behn. New York: Dial Press. ISBN 0-8037-7478-8.
- Goreau, Angeline (1983). "Aphra Behn: A scandal to modesty (c. 1640–1689)". In Spender, Dale (ed.). Feminist theorists: Three centuries of key women thinkers. Pantheon. pp. 8–27. ISBN 0-394-53438-7.
- Hughes, Derek (2001). The Theatre of Aphra Behn. Palgrave Macmillan. ISBN 0-333-76030-1.
- Todd, Janet (1997). The Secret Life of Aphra Behn. Rutgers University Press. ISBN 0-8135-2455-5. A comprehensively researched biography of Behn, with new material on her life as a spy.
- Janet Todd, Aphra Behn: A Secret Life. ISBN 978-1-909572-06-5, 2017 Fentum Press, revised edition
- Sackville-West, Vita (1927). Aphra Behn – The Incomparable Astrea. Gerald Howe. A view of Behn more sympathetic and laudatory than Woolf's.
- Woolf, Virginia (1929). A Room of One's Own. Only one section deals with Behn, but it served as a starting point for the feminist rediscovery of Behn's role.
- Huntting, Nancy. "What Is Triumph in Love? with a consideration of Aphra Behn".
- Greer, Germaine (1995). Slip-Shod Sibyls. Two chapters deal with Aphra Behn with emphasis on her character as a poet
- Hutner, Heidi (1993). Rereading Aphra Behn: History, Theory, and Criticism. University of Virginia Press. ISBN 978-0-8139-1443-5.
- Hutchinson, John (1892). "Afra Behn" . Men of Kent and Kentishmen (Subscription ed.). Canterbury: Cross & Jackman. pp. 15–163.
- Britland, Karen (2021). "Aphra Behn's First Marriage?". The Seventeenth Century, 36:1. 33–53.
- Hilton, Lisa (2024). The Scandal of the Century. Michael Joseph, 352 pp.
- Marsh, Patricia (2024). Three Faces. The Conrad Press. ISBN 978-1-916966-60-4 A novel based on the known facts of Behn's life.
