= Outline of Leeds =

Overview and topical guide of Leeds

The following is an outline and topical guide of Leeds:

Leeds is a city (Note: The area that is the subject of this article does not have legal city status itself, but is widely regarded as a city since it is the main and nominate settlement in the City of Leeds local government area) in West Yorkshire, England, United Kingdom. It is the largest settlement in Yorkshire and the administrative centre of the City of Leeds Metropolitan Borough, which is the second most populous district in the United Kingdom.

Coat of Arms of Leeds City Council

== General reference ==
- Common English name(s):
  - Leeds
- Demonym:
  - Loiner

== Geography of Leeds ==
- Population:
  - 536,280
  - 622,820 (Council area)
- Area:
  - 111.6 km2 (43.1 sq mi)

=== Location ===
- Northern Hemisphere, Eastern Hemisphere
  - Europe
    - Northwestern Europe
      - United Kingdom
        - Great Britain
          - England
            - Northern England
              - Yorkshire
                - West Yorkshire
                  - City of Leeds

=== Areas ===
- Adel
- Alwoodley
- Armley
- Beeston
- Belle Isle
- Black Moor
- Bramley
- Burley
- Chapel Allerton
- Chapeltown
- Churwell
- City Centre
- Colton
- Cookridge
- Cross Gates
- Far Headingley
- Gamble Hill
- Gipton
- Gledhow
- Halton
- Harehills
- Hawksworth
- Headingley
- Hunslet
- Hyde Park
- Killingbeck
- Kirkstall
- Knowsthorpe
- Lawnswood
- Leeds Dock
- Little London
- Manston
- Middleton
- Moor Allerton
- Moorside
- Moortown
- New Farnley
- Oakwood
- Osmondthorpe
- Pendas Fields
- Rodley
- Roundhay
- Seacroft
- Sheepscar
- Stourton
- The Calls
- West Park
- Wortley

=== Parks, gardens and squares ===
- Armley Park
- Armouries Square
- Bramley Park
- Bramley Fall Park
- City Square
- Farnley Hall Park
- Golden Acre Park
- Horsforth Hall Park
- Kirkstall Abbey
- Merrion Street Gardens
- Middleton Park
- Millennium Square
- Park Square
- Potternewton Park
- Pudsey Park
- Roundhay Park
- Springhead Park
- Temple Newsam
- Thorpe Park
- Wetherby Ings
- Woodhouse Moor

== Government and politics of Leeds ==
- Leeds City Council
- Mayor of Leeds

=== Parliamentary Constituencies ===
- Leeds Central and Headingley
- Leeds East
- Leeds North East
- Leeds North West
- Leeds South
- Leeds South West and Morley
- Leeds West and Pudsey
- Selby
- Wakefield and Rothwell
- Wetherby and Easingwold

== Culture of Leeds ==
- Culture of Leeds

=== Art of Leeds ===
- Leeds Art Gallery
- List of public art in Leeds

=== Cinema of Leeds ===
- Leeds International Film Festival

=== Religion in Leeds ===
- List of places of worship in Leeds

==== Dioceses ====
- Anglican Diocese of Leeds
- Roman Catholic Diocese of Leeds

== Transportation in Leeds ==
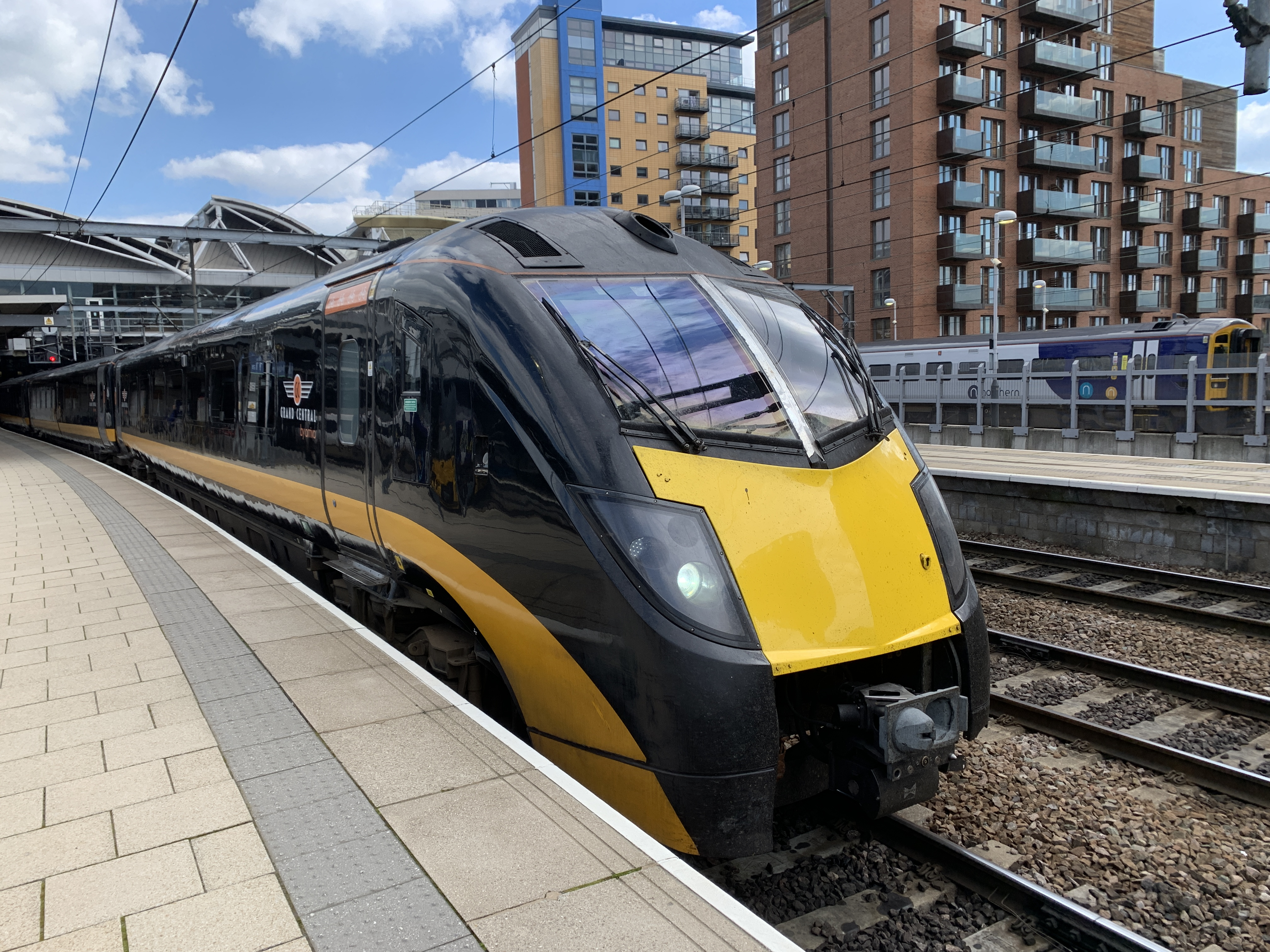
British Rail Class 180 at Leeds railway station

=== Railway stations ===
- Leeds
- Bramley
- Burley Park
- Cross Gates
- Cottingley
- East Garforth
- Garforth
- Guiseley
- Headingley
- Horsforth
- Kirkstall Forge
- Micklefield
- Morley
- New Pudsey
- Woodlesford

=== Airports ===
- Leeds Bradford Airport

== Education in Leeds ==
=== Universities ===
- Leeds Arts University
- Leeds Beckett University
- Leeds Trinity University
- University of Leeds

=== Schools ===
- List of schools in Leeds

== See also ==
- Outline of England
- Outline of the United Kingdom
