= Pudsey Lowtown railway station =

Disused railway station in West Yorkshire, England

Pudsey Lowtown
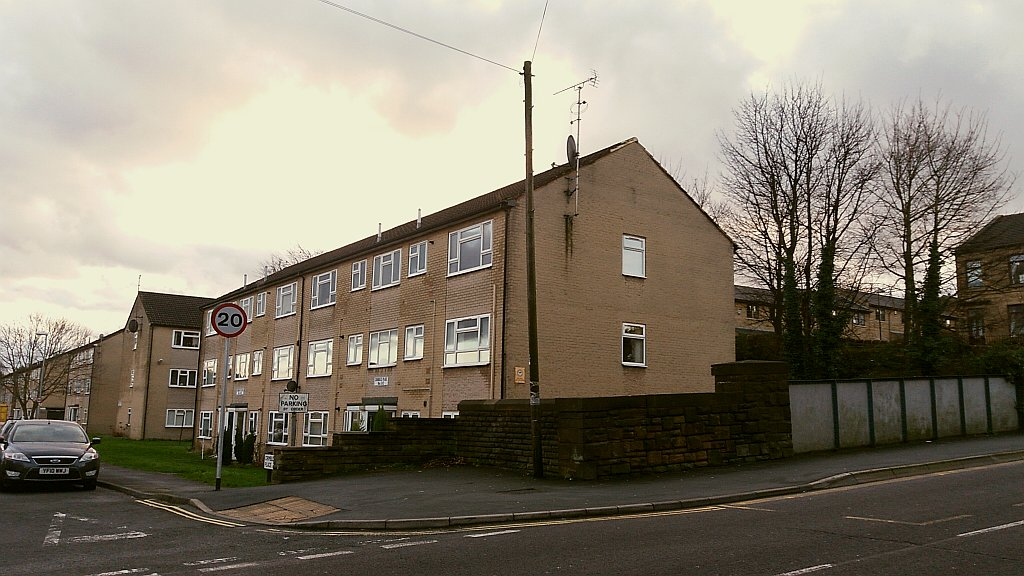
- Site of the former station in January 2016, bridge parapet visible on the right

General information
- Location: Pudsey, City of Leeds; England
- Coordinates: 53.7974°N 1.6577°W
- Grid reference: SE 226 335
- Platforms: 2

Other information
- Status: Disused

History
- Pre-grouping: Great Northern Railway

Key dates
- 1 April 1878: Station opened
- 15 June 1964: Station closed
Location

Pudsey Lowtown railway station is a closed railway station in Pudsey, in the former West Riding of Yorkshire, located about 5 miles (8 km) west of Leeds station. It served the eastern parts of the town of Pudsey.

It was opened to passengers on 1 April 1878 as an intermediate station on the single-track branch line from Bramley to Pudsey Greenside, built by the Great Northern Railway. Freight traffic on this line had already started in 1877. In 1893 the line was double-tracked and extended beyond Pudsey Greenside through Greenside Tunnel towards Laisterdyke and Dudley Hill, forming the Pudsey Loop. Upon the reorganisation of the railways in 1923, the line passed to the London and North Eastern Railway, and in 1948 to the Eastern Region of British Railways.

The station was located on a north–south section of the line, south of the bridge of Lowtown street (B6154) across the railway cutting, with the station building standing near the road at the northern end of the station. The platforms flanking the tracks were located west of the station building, the train tracks and goods facilities to the east.

The station and the line in its entirety were closed to all traffic on 15 June 1964. The site of the former station is now occupied by housing, and the cutting in its vicinity has been filled in for the most part. A bus stop is located next to the bridge across the former railway line. Pudsey is now served by the station New Pudsey on the Calder Valley Line, opened on 6 March 1967 and located about 1 mile (1.6 km) north of the town centre.

Preceding station	Disused railways	Following station
Bramley (West Yorkshire) or Stanningley	GNR; Pudsey Loop	Pudsey Greenside
