= Bramley Fall stone =

Type of stone

Bramley Fall Quarry
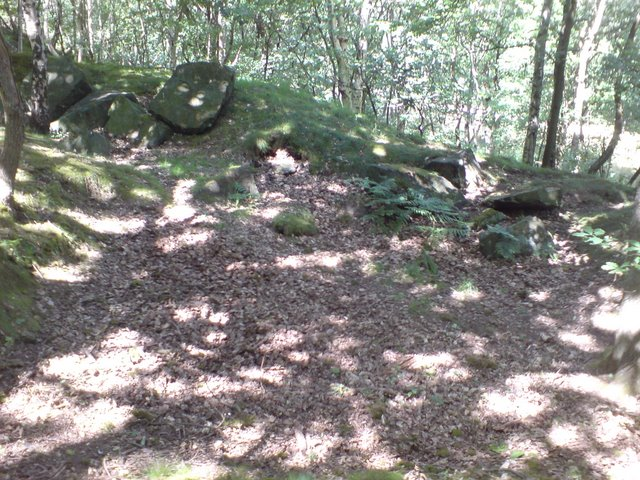
- Old quarry, Bramley Fall Park

- The quarry's position in Leeds
- Location: Near Horsforth Leeds, West Yorkshire, England; 53°49′22″N 1°37′26″W
- Products: Millstone Grit
- Discovered: 13th century
- Closed: c. 1930
- Company: B. Whitaker and sons, 4 Albion Street, Leeds in 1927

Bramley Fall Stone belongs to the Millstone Grit series, of the Namurian stage of the Carboniferous Period. It is one of the cheapest and best-adapted English stones for extensive engineering works, docks, locks and railways, and for large millstones, grindstones, engine-beds and foundations. The stone was formerly quarried at or near the village of Bramley, Leeds. Evidence of the quarries, which were discontinued around 1930, remains in Bramley Fall Park. A similar Millstone Grit stone also occurs over an extensive area at Calverley where Ann Husler ran a quarrying business in the 19th century, and at Ilkley and Pateley in Yorkshire. A somewhat similar stone, which can be very coarse, approaching a conglomerate is found at Weetwood, Meanwood and Horsforth. Similar Millstone Grits have also been quarried in Derbyshire.

== Properties ==
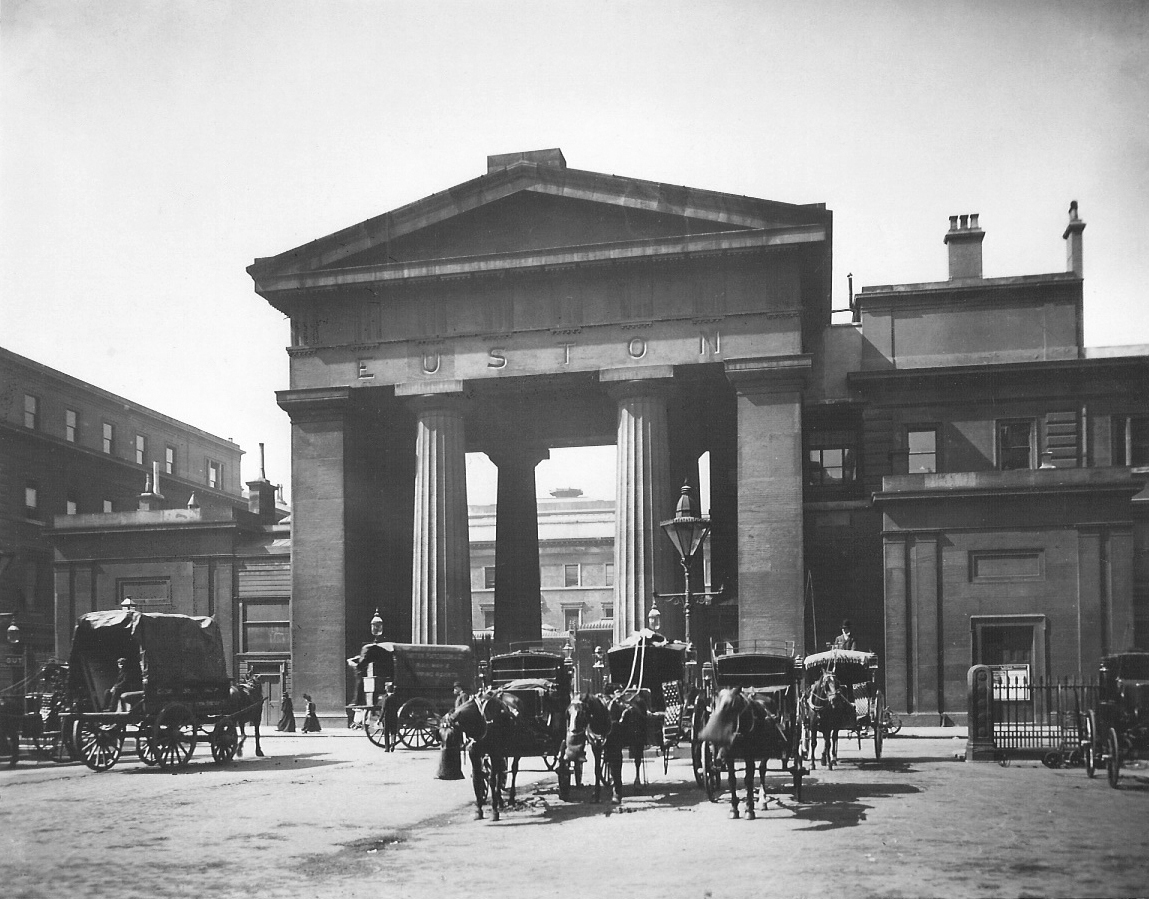
Euston Arch, constructed in 1838

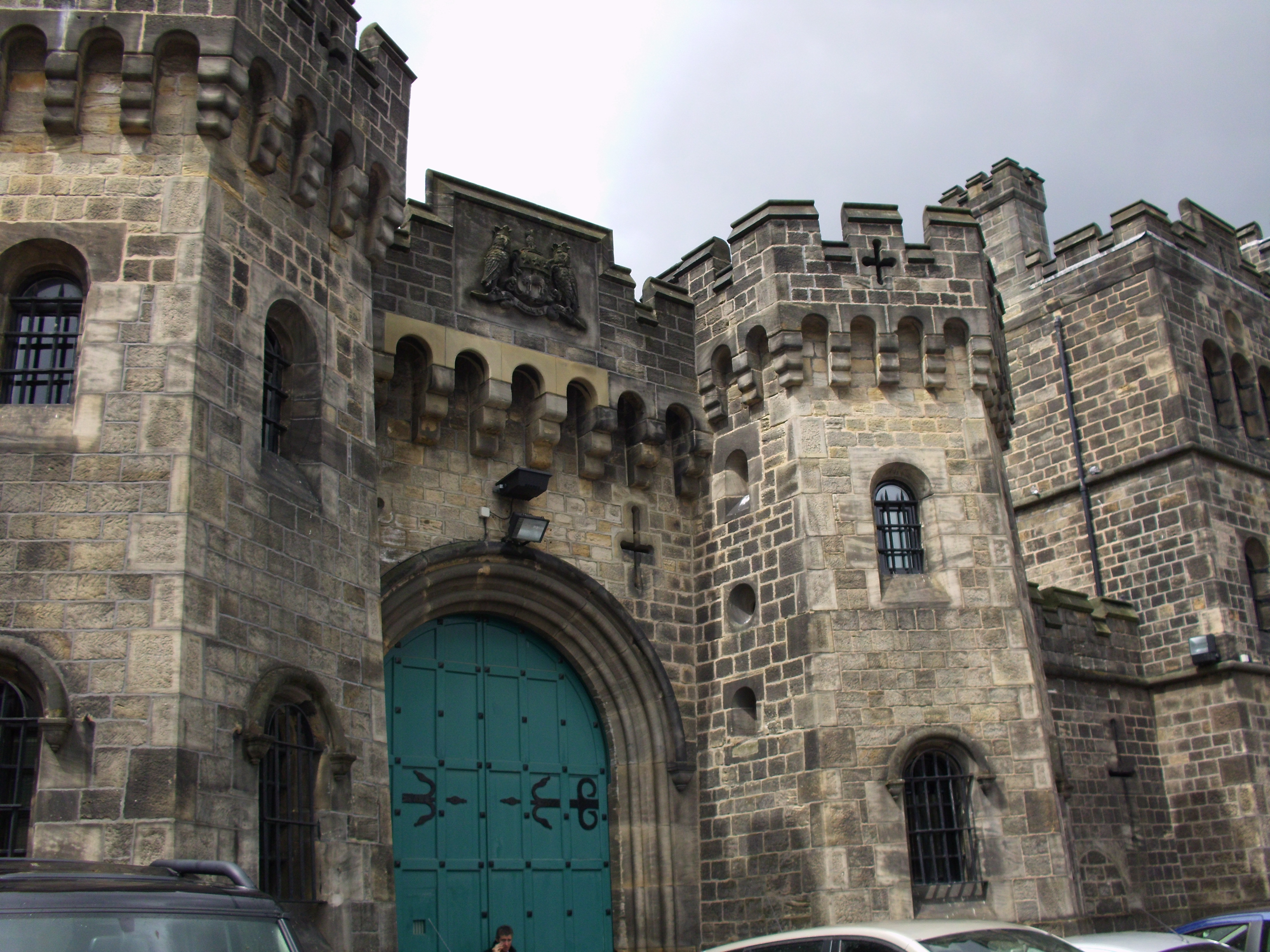
Old Gate – Armley Prison HM Prison Leeds

The attraction of Bramley Fall stone that it is comparatively easy to quarry in large blocks. It has considerable strength and weathers well. The stone can withstand shock, making it ideal for engine beds and defensive works, such as the Napoleonic Martello Towers around the south-eastern coast of England. The mean crushing strain of this stone is (upon a 6-inch cube) 265.7 tons per foot super. It is resistant to water and tends to strengthen on exposure, making it particularly suitable for canal and harbour engineering work.

== Quarrying today ==
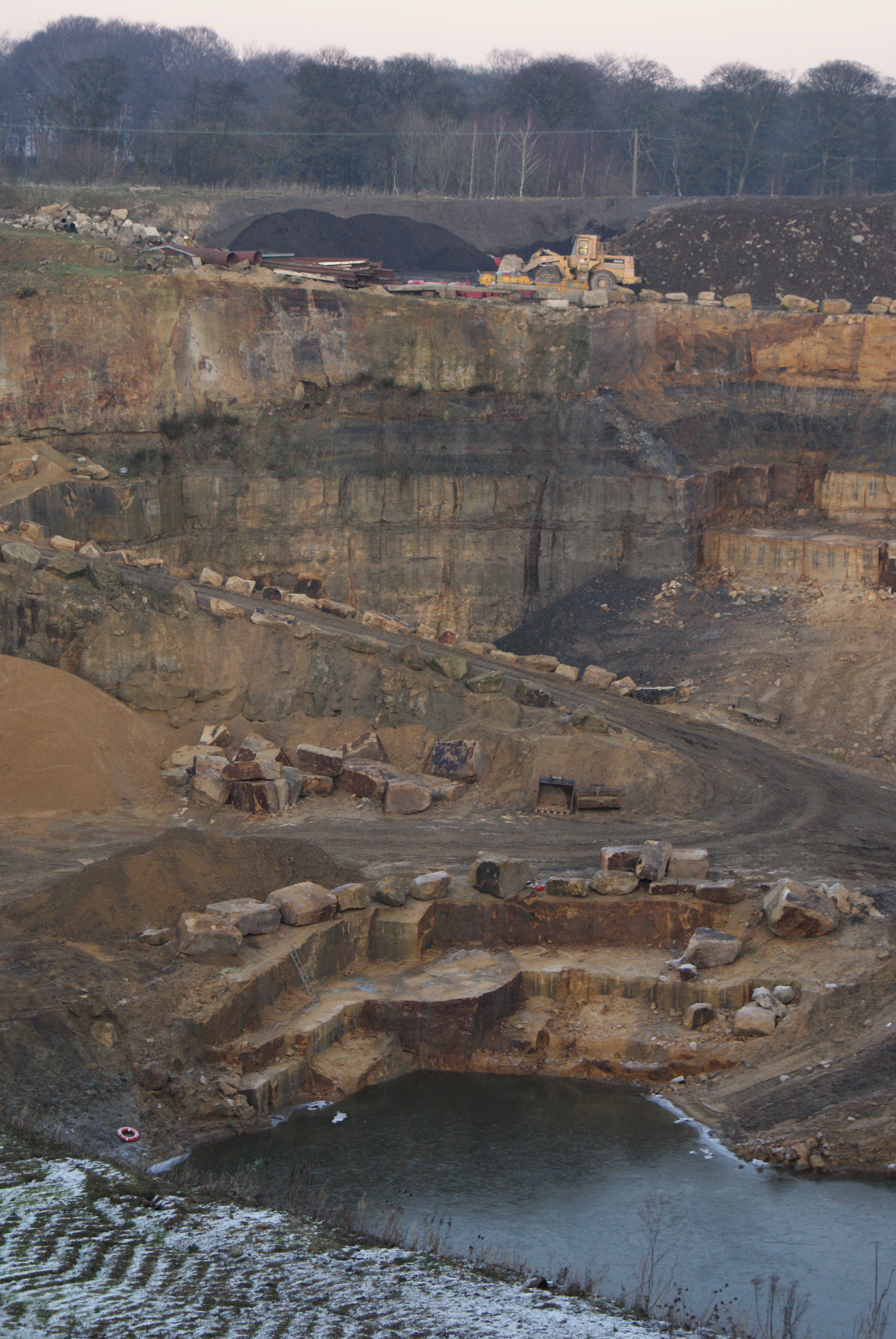
Blackhill Quarry, Bramhope

The modern main source of Bramley Fall stone is the Blackhill Quarry operated by Mone Bros Ltd at Kings Road, Eccup, Bramhope, Leeds. The quarry is next to Golden Acre Park. In 2011, four thousand tonnes of Bramley Fall sandstone, sourced at Blackhill, was used to widen Blackfriars Bridge when the new railway station was being constructed.

== Architectural use of Bramley Fall stone ==
Bramley Fall stone is a generic term and unless its source can be shown to come from the Bramley quarries, it can refer to stone sourced over a wider area around Leeds and as far as Knaresborough in North Yorkshire.

Examples of the use of Bramley:

- Kirkstall Abbey
- Euston Arch
- Leeds Town Hall
- Leeds Corn Exchange
- Armley Gaol. Constructed in 1847 in a turreted Gothic Style to designs of the architects William Belton Perkin and Elisha Backhouse. The stone was supplied by John Husler from the Weetwood Quarry.
- Westminster Bridge, London (1854–1862). Stone supplied by Ann Husler from the Weetwood Quarry.
- Port of Dover Seaward facing exterior
- Valley Bridge, Scarborough
