= Moorside, Leeds =

Area of Leeds, West Yorkshire, England

Coordinates: 53.8182°N 1.6280°W

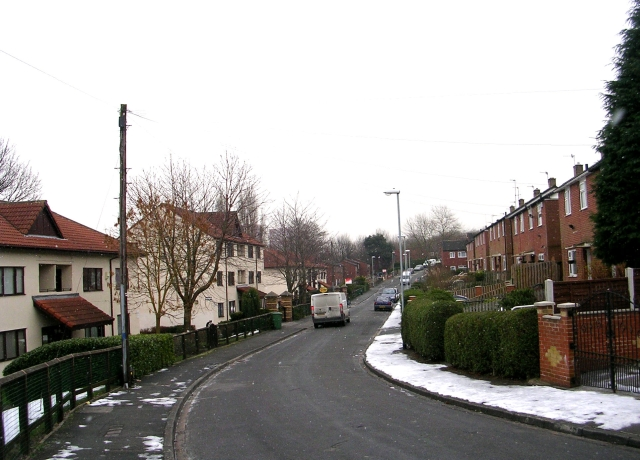
Wellstone Garth - Wellstone Avenue

Moorside is part of the Bramley area of Leeds, West Yorkshire, England. Moorside falls within the Bramley and Stanningley ward of the Leeds Metropolitan Council.

== See also ==
- Listed buildings in Leeds (Bramley and Stanningley Ward)
