= Listed buildings in Leeds (Bramley and Stanningley Ward) =

Bramley and Stanningley is a ward in the metropolitan borough of the City of Leeds, West Yorkshire, England. It contains 37 listed buildings that are recorded in the National Heritage List for England. All the listed buildings are designated at Grade II, the lowest of the three grades, which is applied to "buildings of national importance and special interest". The ward is to the northwest of the centre of Leeds, and includes the areas of Bramley, Moorside, Rodley, Stanningley, and Whitecote. Most of the listed buildings are houses, cottages and associated structures. The Leeds and Liverpool Canal runs through the ward, and the listed buildings associated with it are two locks and two bridges crossing it. The other listed buildings include churches and associated structures, public houses, a retaining wall retaining items involved in the early supply of water to the area, schools, a former bank, and public swimming baths.

== Buildings ==
| Name and location | Photograph | Date | Notes |
|---|---|---|---|
| 261 Upper Town Street, Bramley; 53.81308°N 1.63044°W | | Mid 18th century | An additional storey was added to the house in about 1820. It is in stone with quoins, and a stone slate roof with coped gables. There are three storeys and three bays. The central doorway has a plain surround, and the windows have architraves; above the doorway they have single lights, and the other windows are mullioned with two lights. |
| Abbey Inn; 53.82678°N 1.63780°W | | Mid 18th century | The public house is in gritstone with quoins, and a stone slate roof with coped gables. There are two storeys and two bays. The original doorway has tie-stone jambs, it is blocked, and there is a large modern porch. The windows are mullioned with two lights. |
| House near to entrance gates to factory 53.80736°N 1.65838°W | — | Mid to late 18th century | A stone house with quoins, and a stone slate roof with a coped gable on the left. There are two storeys, a partial cellar and an attic, a double-depth plan, and three bays. The central doorway has tie-stone chamfered jambs and a shallow-arched lintel. Above it is a single-light window, and the other windows are mullioned with two lights. |
| Kirkstall Lock; 53.81856°N 1.61195°W | | 1770–77 | The lock on the Leeds and Liverpool Canal has gritstone retaining walls and an overflow channel. There are two pairs of timber gates, and the machinery is in cast iron. |
| Newlay Locks; 53.82594°N 1.63315°W | | 1770–77 | A flight of three locks on the Leeds and Liverpool Canal. The walls are in millstone grit, there are steps on each side, steel footbridges, and an overflow on the south side. |
| 259 Upper Town Street, Bramley; 53.81297°N 1.63059°W | | Late 18th century | Originally a manor house, it was later extended to the left and used for other purposes. The house is in gritstone, with quoins and stone gutter brackets, and a stone slate roof with coped gables. There are two storeys, three bays and a two-bay extension to the left. In the centre is a wide entrance with Doric columns in antis, flanked by tall windows, and with bow windows beyond. In the upper floor are sash windows with plain surrounds. |
| 331 Upper Town Street, Bramley, 1 Haley's Yard, and wall 53.81441°N 1.63399°W | | Late 18th century | The house is in gritstone with modillion eaves brackets, and a stone slate roof with coped gables. There are two storeys and an attic, three bays, and an added bay on the left. The doorway has a fanlight, and a segmental pediment on console brackets. In the gable end facing the road is a round-arched attic window. The garden wall extends along the roadside, and is about 40 metres (130 ft) long and 1.5 metres (4 ft 11 in) high. It is in gritstone with rounded coping, and contains gate piers with pointed capstones. |
| 134, 136 and 138 Town Street, Rodley; 53.82326°N 1.66038°W | | Late 18th century | A row of three cottages in gritstone with quoins, paired gutter brackets, and a stone slate roof with a coped gable on the left. Each cottage has one bay, at the front there are two storeys, and at the rear are four storeys and attics. The doorways have plain surrounds, and most windows are mullioned with some mullions removed. At the rear are taking-in doors converted into windows. |
| 140 Town Street, Rodley; 53.82325°N 1.66053°W | | Late 18th century | A cottage in gritstone with paired gutter brackets, and a stone slate roof with a coped gable on the left. It has one bay, two storeys at the front, and three at the rear. The doorway has a plain surround, tie-stone jambs and a fanlight, there is a shop window to the left, and a two-light mullioned window above. |
| 144 Town Street, Rodley; 53.82320°N 1.66077°W | | Late 18th century | A cottage in gritstone with a stone slate roof. There are two bays, two storeys at the front and three at the rear. In the centre is a doorway with tie-stone jambs, and to its left is a wide flat arch. The windows are mullioned. |
| 34 and 36 Rock Lane, Whitecote; 53.81751°N 1.64059°W | | Late 18th century | A pair of rendered stone cottages that have a stone slate roof with coped gables. There are two storeys, and each cottage has three bays and a gabled porch. No. 34 has one single-light window, and the other windows are mullioned with two lights. The windows of No. 36 are replacement casements. |
| Bridge No. 221; 53.82588°N 1.63696°W | | Late 18th century | The bridge carries Pollard Lane over the Leeds and Liverpool Canal. It is in gritstone and consists of a single elliptical arch. The bridge has chamfered voussoirs and shallow ridged coping. |
| Stocks Hill Pump and raised pavement 53.81080°N 1.62695°W | | Late 18th century | The retaining wall to the raised pavement is in gritstone, it is about 3 metres (9.8 ft) high and 30 metres (98 ft) long, and has rusticated pilasters at the ends. The wall contains two arched niches, one with a trough, and the other with the remains of a cast iron pump with a lion mask, handle and tray. |
| Town End House; 53.80617°N 1.62338°W | | Late 18th century | A house divided into flats, it is in gritstone with shaped eaves brackets, and a slate roof with coped gables and kneelers. There are three storeys and three bays. The doorway is in the centre, the windows above have single lights, and the other windows are mullioned with two lights, and contain sash-like casements. At the rear is a narrow round-headed stair window. |
| Warrel's House; 53.81300°N 1.63139°W | | Late 18th century | A stone house with a barn at the rear, later incorporated into the house. The house has quoins, and a stone slate roof with coped gables and kneelers. There are two storeys and three bays, and a lower two-storey rear wing extending into the barn. In the centre is a porch with a moulded cornice, and a doorway with a fanlight, and the windows are sashes with architraves. At the rear is a wide arch with a keystone, a round-arched window, mullioned windows, and a blocked segmental-arched cart entry. |
| Whitecote House with adjoining ranges 53.82235°N 1.63863°W | | Late 18th century | The house and adjoining former warehouses, which overlook the Leeds and Liverpool Canal, are in gritstone with stone slate roofs. The house has quoins, bands, two storeys and an attic, and three bays, and is flanked on the left by a single-storey two-bay range, and on the right by a single-storey seven bay range, both converted for residential use. Steps lead up to a central doorway in the house, which has an architrave, a fanlight, a fluted frieze and a cornice. The windows are sashes, the window above the doorway has an architrave, and in the gable is a blocked round window. At the rear is a round-headed stair window, and all parts have cellars. |
| Stables, Whitecote House; 53.82200°N 1.63851°W | | Late 18th century | The stables and hayloft, which have been converted for residential use, are in gritstone with a hipped roof. There are two storeys and three bays, the middle bay projecting with a pedimented gable containing a small round vent. In each outer bay is a doorway with a plain surround, and at the rear are square windows and an outshut. |
| Wall, railings and gate, Whitecote House; 53.82237°N 1.63877°W | — | Late 18th century | The revetment wall in front of the house and along the Leeds and Liverpool Canal is about 50 metres (160 ft) long. It carries wrought iron railings, and contains a gate. |
| 257 Upper Town Street, Bramley; 53.81300°N 1.63001°W | | 1795 | The lodge to the former Manor House, it is in stone with a hipped stone slate roof. There is one storey and two bays. It contains a doorway with a plain surround, and a blocked doorway converted into a window. |
| 428 and 430 Broad Lane, Bramley; 53.81374°N 1.63981°W | | c. 1800 | A pair of stone cottages with moulded gutter brackets, and a stone slate roof with coped gables. There are two storeys and three bays. The doorways are paired in the centre, above them is a single-light window, and each cottage has a three-light mullioned window in each floor. |
| Bridge No. 221A; 53.81668°N 1.61011°W | | c. 1800 | The bridge carries the Leeds and Bradford Road (B6157 road) over the Leeds and Liverpool Canal. It is in stone and consists of an elliptical arch with a secondary narrower round arch to the left. The bridge has rusticated voussoirs, and is flanked by semicircular rusticated buttresses that rise to form pedestrian refuges. At the top is a parapet with moulded coping ending in circular bollards. |
| Rock Inn and former stables 53.81855°N 1.63690°W | | c. 1800 | The public house and former stables are in painted stone and have stone roofs with coped gables. The public house has two storeys and three bays. The central doorway has pilasters, a fanlight, and an entablature. In the upper floor are sash windows, in the ground floor the windows have been converted into casements, and in the gable ends are round-headed attic windows. The former stable is recessed on the left and has two storeys and three bays. In the ground floor is a round-headed doorway flanked by round-headed windows and an impost band, and the upper floor contains segmental-headed windows. |
| 2, 4 and 6 Wesley Street, Rodley; 53.82260°N 1.65890°W | — | 1809 | A row of three gritstone cottages with quoins, a band, and a stone slate roof. There are two storeys and each cottage has one bay. The doorways have tie-stone jambs, the windows are mullioned with some mullions removed, and on the front is an initialled datestone. |
| 327 and 329 Upper Town Street, Bramley; 53.81412°N 1.63330°W | | Early 19th century | A house, later divided into two, it is in gritstone and has a stone slate roof with a coped gable. There are two storeys, No. 327 faces Moorfields and has three bays, and No. 329 faces Upper Town Street and has two bays. No. 327 has a central doorway with a fanlight, an architrave, and a dentilled cornice on consoles, and the windows have plain surrounds. The doorway of No. 327 has a fanlight, a plain surround, and a dentilled cornice, and is flanked by square bay windows. In the upper floor is a sash window, a blind window on the left, and a small window between. |
| 359–367 Upper Town Street, Bramley; 53.81505°N 1.63540°W | | Early 19th century | A row of four cottages with a house on the left. They are in gritstone and have stone slate roofs with coped gables. The cottages have two storeys and one bay each. They contain doorways with plain surrounds, and mullioned windows. The house has a floor band, a moulded eaves course and a blocking course, two storeys and three bays. The central arched doorway has a fanlight, impost blocks, and a keystone, and the windows are sashes with wedge lintels. |
| Acorn Inn; 53.81971°N 1.63423°W | | Early 19th century | A public house with former stables incorporated, it is in stone with paired eaves brackets, and a hipped slate roof. There are two storeys, three bays, and single-storey wings, the left wing extending for three bays. In the centre is a round-arched recess containing a doorway with a fanlight, above it is a single-light window, and the other windows are tripartite sashes. |
| Barley Mow Public House; 53.80749°N 1.62444°W | | Early 19th century | The public house is in gritstone with chamfered quoins, eaves brackets, and a slate roof with coped gables. There are two storeys and five bays. The central doorway has a plain surround, and the windows have architraves and mullions, and contain casements. |
| 333 Upper Town Street and 2–18 Haley's Yard, Bramley; 53.81446°N 1.63421°W | | Early to mid 19th century | A house with two rows of cottages behind, and between the rows are workshops. The buildings are in gritstone with roofs of slate and stone slate. The house has a coved eaves cornice, a hipped roof, two storeys and three bays, and it contains a doorway with a fanlight, and casement windows. At the rear the cottages have two storeys, and the workshops have three storeys, a hipped roof, round-arched entrances with imposts and keystones, some blocked, loading doors with a timber hood above, and mullioned windows in the upper floors. |
| St Thomas' Church, Stanningley; 53.80795°N 1.65626°W | | 1841 | The church, which was extended in 1870, is in Romanesque style. It is built in gritstone with s stone slate roof, and consists of a nave, a chancel, a north organ chamber and a south vestry, and a west tower, The tower has three stages, corner buttresses, and a west doorway with a moulded round-arched head and a gable. The bottom stage contains arcades with three lancet windows, and there are clock faces in the middle stage. In the top stage are moulded arches with columns and lancet windows, a corbel table, gargoyles, and moulded eaves and the tower is surmounted by a pyramidal roof. The nave windows are round-arched with engaged columns, and above them is a corbel table. |
| 2–14 Moorfields, Bramley; 53.81397°N 1.63351°W | | Mid 19th century | A terrace of seven gritstone houses that have a stone slate roof with coped gables and kneelers. There are three storeys, and each house has one bay. The doorways have plain surrounds, and the windows are mullioned with casements. |
| Pair of lamp posts, St Thomas' Church, Stanningley; 53.80790°N 1.65657°W | | Mid 19th century | The lamp post near the west end of the church is in cast iron on a stone plinth, and is about 3 metres (9.8 ft) high. It has a moulded base with ball feet and shields, from which rises a tapering shaft. At the top are ladder arms and a moulded lamp base. |
| St Peter's Church, Bramley; 53.81115°N 1.62913°W | | 1861 | The body of the church was much rebuilt in the 1970s. The church is in stone with a blue slate roof, and it consists of a nave, a chancel, and a northwest steeple. The steeple is in Decorated style, and has a tower with three stages, angle buttresses, a pinnacle with pierced trefoils and corner pinnacles, and a spire with clock faces at the base. |
| Hough Lane Centre; 53.80949°N 1.63098°W | | 1877 | A board school, later used for other purposes, it is in gritstone with a slate roof, and is in Gothic Revival style. There is one storey, and the building consists of a three-bay hall range with projecting gabled cross-wings. The central bay of the hall range is gabled, and in the centre of the roof is a square bellcote with an octagonal spire and a finial. |
| Gate, gate piers and railings, Hough Lane Centre; 53.80979°N 1.63121°W | — | 1877 | The gate piers are in stone, and about 2.5 metres (8 ft 2 in) high. Each pier has a plinth, a shaft carved with corner columns, bands of roundels, a gabled capstone with cusped recessed panels, and a moulded top. The gate and railings are in cast iron, and the railings are on a low stone wall. |
| Rodley Primary School and walls 53.82260°N 1.65918°W | | 1877 | The school, which was extended in about 1890, is in gritstone with a moulded string course, and a grey slate roof with coped gables and trefoil finials. There is one storey, the initial range has four bays, and the extension is a long gabled wing. The entrance has a round arch, and the windows are mullioned and transomed. On the roof of the left wing is a ventilator. The grounds are enclosed by low walls with chamfered coping and railings, and the gate piers are square at the base and octagonal above, and each has a frieze of trefoil panels and a moulded cap with cresting. |
| Legta; 53.80539°N 1.66670°W | | c. 1900 | A former bank on a corner site, it is in stone, partly rendered, with coped gables, a sill band, an eaves cornice, and a balustraded parapet. There are three storeys and two bays. In the ground floor is an entablature and a cornice, and on the left is a segmental-arched doorway with a triple keystone and a decorated lintel. To the right is a three-light window with Ionic pilasters, and the upper floors contain sash windows with channelled wedge lintels. In the left return is a segmental bow window, and above is a narrow arched stair window with voussoirs. To the left is an enclosure with cast and wrought iron railings. |
| Bramley Baths; 53.81420°N 1.63873°W | | 1904 | The public swimming baths are on a corner site and are in gritstone with a slate roof, partly glazed, and have a two-storey three-bay entrance block, and single-storey baths to the left. The left two bays of the entrance block have a Dutch gable with the Leeds coat of arms, an inscription in recessed panels, and owl and ball finials. Below are double doors and a fanlight, over which is an ornate scrolled hood on console brackets. In the right bay is a four-light mullioned window. To the right of this is an entrance that has gate piers with ball finials, and an engine-house block with a tapering square chimney. To the left of the entrance the baths complex contains two windows with ornate surrounds and pediments, and in the left return are two entrance bays with pyramidal roofs. |
