= Bramley Fall Park =

Public park in Leeds

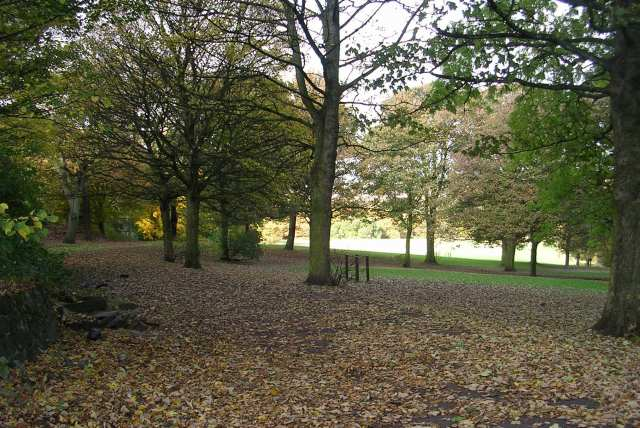
- Interactive map of Bramley Fall Park
- Location: Leeds, West Yorkshire
- OS grid: SE247363
- Coordinates: 53°49′22″N 1°37′26″W
- Area: 80.05 acres (32.40 ha)
- Operator: Leeds City Council

Bramley Fall Park (also known as Bramley Fall Woods or Bramley Fall Park & Woods) is a 80.05 acres (32.40 ha) public park in Bramley, Leeds, England. It is managed by Leeds City Council.

Before it was a public park, Bramley Fall was a large quarry with Bramley Fall stone contributing to many notable buildings in the area including Leeds Town Hall, Kirkstall Abbey and the Corn Exchange.

== See also ==
- Bramley Park
