= New Pudsey railway station =

Railway station in Pudsey, West Yorkshire, England

New Pudsey
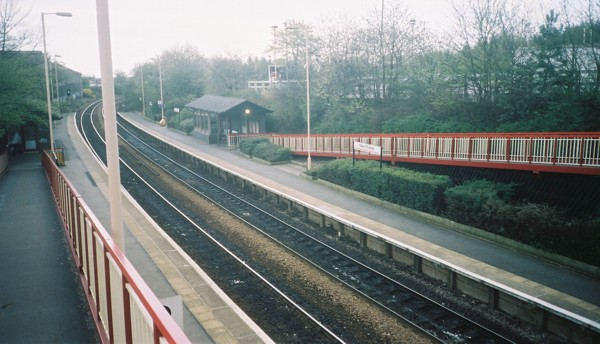
- New Pudsey railway station in May 2006

General information
- Location: Farsley, City of Leeds; England
- Coordinates: 53.804720°N 1.680560°W
- Grid reference: SE211343
- Managed by: Northern
- Transit authority: West Yorkshire (Metro)
- Platforms: 2

Other information
- Station code: NPD
- Fare zone: 2
- Classification: DfT category E

History
- Opened: 6 March 1967

Passengers
- 2020/21: ▼0.114 million
- 2021/22: ▲0.402 million
- 2022/23: ▲0.557 million
- 2023/24: ▲0.666 million
- 2024/25: ▲0.789 million
Location
Notes
- Passenger statistics from the Office of Rail and Road

New Pudsey railway station is a station between Leeds and Bradford on the Calder Valley line, which serves the towns of Farsley and Pudsey in West Yorkshire, England. It also serves the adjacent suburb of Thornbury.

== Facilities ==
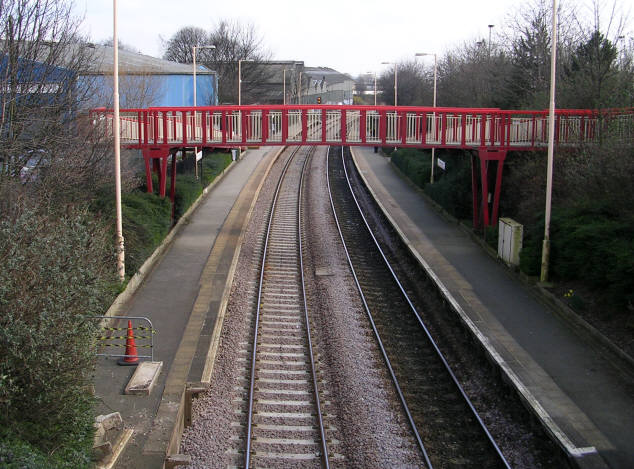
New Pudsey station seen from the road bridge of Owlcotes Lane with footbridge and access ramps to platforms in March 2007

The station is staffed, and the ticket office is open from 05:55 to 19:00 on Mondays to Saturdays. A ticket machine is also available. Step-free access from the booking office to both platforms is provided via ramps to the footbridge that links them. Train running information is available via passenger information screens and P.A. announcements. The platforms are long enough to accommodate Intercity trains, and there is a large car park to the south of the station.

New Pudsey was originally served by occasional through trains from Bradford Interchange to London Kings Cross. However, after electrification of the East Coast Main Line, through services were routed via Shipley to Bradford Forster Square.

== History ==
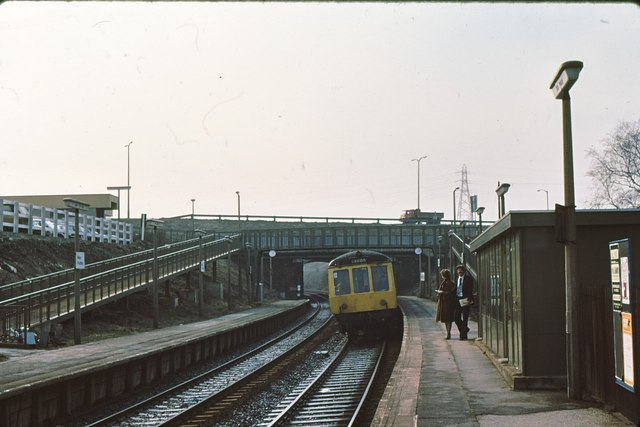
New Pudsey in April 1979 with a westbound service to Leeds

Pudsey was originally served by a short branch line running from Stanningley railway station to Pudsey Greenside, opened in 1878 by the Great Northern Railway. In 1893 the line was extended through Greenside Tunnel to Laisterdyke, the original curve from Stanningley closed, and another (90°) curve to Bramley opened forming the Pudsey loop line railway. There were two stations on the loop, Pudsey Lowtown and Pudsey Greenside, conveniently located at either end of the town centre. Both closed on 15 June 1964 as a result of the Beeching Axe.

This station was opened by British Rail on 6 March 1967 and is located in Farsley about 1 mile (1.6 km) north-west of Pudsey town centre. It was opened as a 'new' station for Pudsey; there is no place called "New Pudsey".

The station is situated just under a mile west of the location of the former Stanningley railway station (formerly Stanningley for Farsley), which closed on 1 January 1968, having supposedly been replaced by New Pudsey, although the two catchment areas were largely different.

New Pudsey was one of the first railway stations to be specifically built as a railway station for motorists, being situated on the convergence of several main roads and the ring road, and after opening was featured in a film by British Transport Films for this reason. The 13 minute film was called Rail Report 8: The New Tradition (1968).

== Services ==
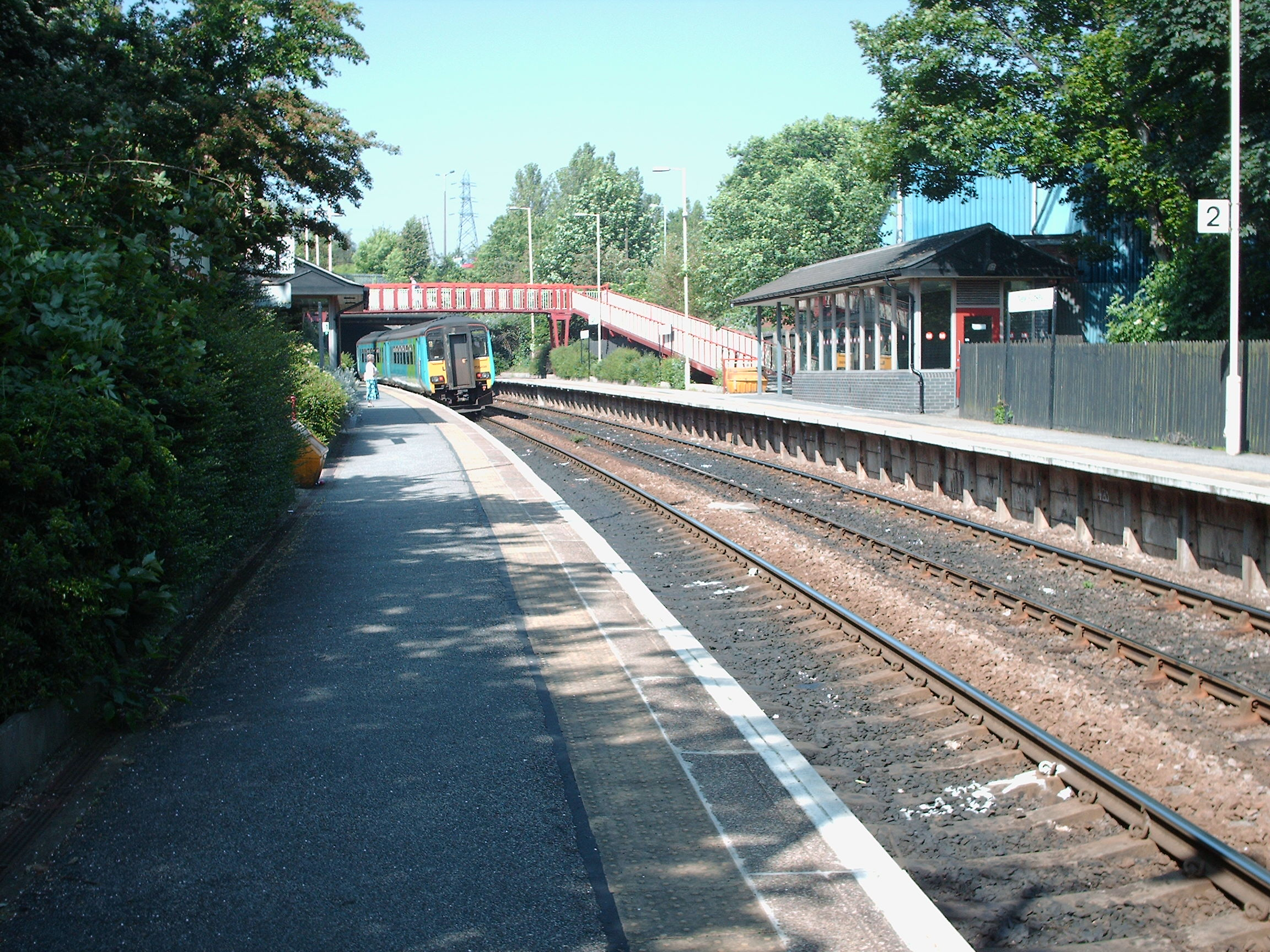
Eastbound service with 156498 at New Pudsey in June 2006

=== Eastbound ===
During Monday to Saturday daytimes, there are four trains an hour to Leeds; in the evenings this service runs twice hourly. One train each hour continues beyond Leeds to York and a second to Selby. On Sundays there is a thrice hourly service with one train each hour continuing to York. From the winter 2019 timetable change, a new service to Hull via Selby has been introduced in place of the former Huddersfield - Bradford - Leeds service (which now only runs on Sundays), restoring through journey opportunities to local stations east of Leeds that were removed in December 2018.

=== Westbound ===
During Monday to Saturday daytimes there are four trains an hour to Bradford Interchange and Halifax. Two trains each hour continue to Manchester Victoria (one limited stop, the other serving all stations to Todmorden, then Rochdale only and now running through to Chester), one runs to Blackpool North via Blackburn and one terminates at Halifax. The service is thrice-hourly in the evenings with two trains per hour running to Manchester Victoria (one to Chester) and to Blackpool North. From the December 2019 timetable change, Huddersfield passengers now need to change at Bradford as the current through service has been curtailed there on weekdays and Saturdays (though the overall service pattern will remain unchanged, with a Hull to Halifax service taking its place). On Sundays, there are four trains per hour - two to Manchester and one Blackpool North and Huddersfield. One of the Manchester trains now runs through to Chester.

== Transport links ==
The next bus stops are on Stanningley Bypass (express services between Bradford and Leeds and local services between Pudsey Owlcotes Centre and Leeds), in Bradford Road (services to Leeds, Bradford, and Halifax). A stop for the frequent service between Pudsey and Seacroft is located at the corner of Bradford Road and Old Road, approximately 0.4 miles (0.64 km) from the station.

== New Pudsey station on television ==
The station was featured in a 1969 Monty Python's Flying Circus sketch (Science Fiction Sketch/Man Turns Into Scotsman) in which Harold Potter (Michael Palin) is turned into a Scotsman by creatures from the planet Skyron in the galaxy of Andromeda. Graham Chapman and Eric Idle (with Idle in drag) briefly appear on Platform 1 early in the sketch as Mr and Mrs Samuel Brainsample.

After the camera pans off Chapman and Idle, Palin is shown walking up the ramp from the platform toward town. At the beginning of the sketch, reference is made to the alien visitors coming "to conquer and destroy the very heart of civilisation", with a fade-in to the sign reading "New Pudsey". Laughter follows.

Preceding station	National Rail	Following station
Bradford Interchange	Northern; Calder Valley line	Bramley
Bradford Interchange	Northern; York–Blackpool North	Leeds
	Historical railways	
Bradford Exchange	Great Northern; Leeds, Bradford and Halifax Junction Railway	Stanningley
