= Pudsey Greenside railway station =

Disused railway station in West Yorkshire, England

Pudsey Greenside
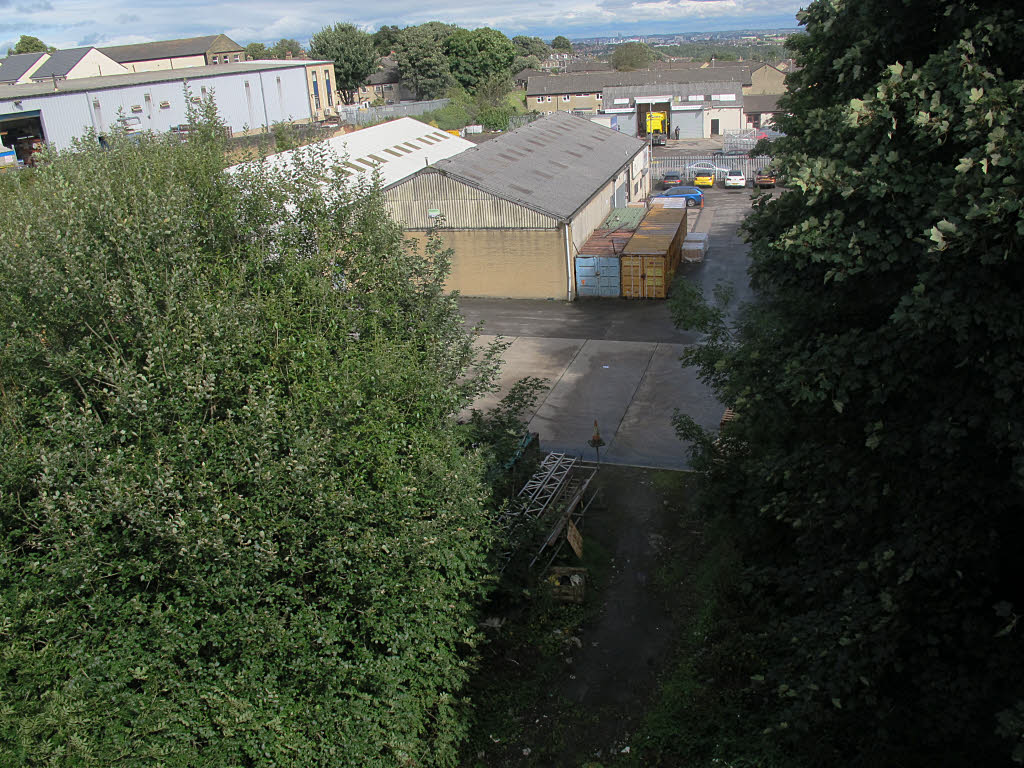
- Site of the former Pudsey Greenside station in January 2016, looking east from the bridge of Carlisle Road

General information
- Location: Pudsey, City of Leeds; England
- Coordinates: 53.7899°N 1.6683°W
- Grid reference: SE 219 326
- Platforms: 2

Other information
- Status: Disused

History
- Pre-grouping: Great Northern Railway
- Post-grouping: London and North Eastern Railway

Key dates
- 1 April 1878: Station opened
- 15 June 1964: Station closed
Location

Pudsey Greenside railway station is a closed railway station in Pudsey in the former West Riding of Yorkshire England, located about 6 miles (10 km) west of Leeds station. It served the central part and western parts of Pudsey.

It was opened to passengers on 1 April 1878 as the terminus of a single-track branch line from Bramley, built by the Great Northern Railway. Freight traffic had already started in 1877. In 1893 this line was double-tracked and extended through Greenside Tunnel towards Laisterdyke and Dudley Hill, forming the Pudsey loop. Upon the reorganisation of the railways in 1923, the line passed to the London and North Eastern Railway, and in 1948 to the Eastern Region of British Railways.

The station was located east of Carlisle Road, with the station building on its northern side. A substantial goods shed was built on the south side of the station.

The station and the line in its entirety were closed to all traffic on 15 June 1964. The site of the former station is now occupied by warehouses. The site where the goods sheds and sidings once stood is now housing. Pudsey is now served by the station New Pudsey on the Calder Valley Line, opened on 6 March 1967 and located about 1 mile (1.6 km) north of the town centre.

Preceding station	Disused railways	Following station
Pudsey Lowtown	GNR; Pudsey loop railway	Laisterdyke or Dudley Hill
