= Stanningley railway station =

Disused railway station in West Yorkshire, England

Stanningley
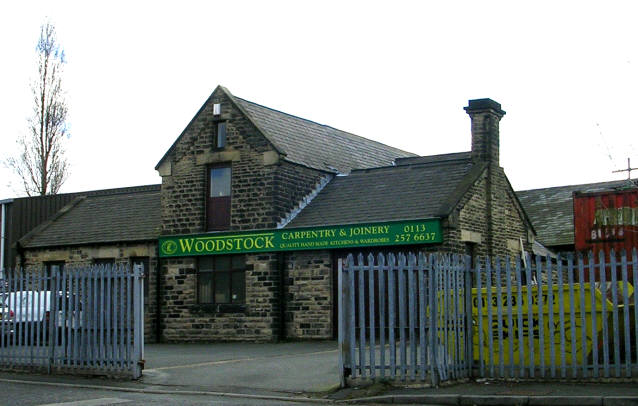
- Station building in March 2007.

General information
- Location: Stanningley, Pudsey, City of Leeds; England
- Coordinates: 53.8053°N 1.6650°W
- Grid reference: SE 221 343
- Platforms: 2

Other information
- Status: Disused

History
- Pre-grouping: Great Northern Railway
- Post-grouping: London and North Eastern Railway

Key dates
- 1 August 1854: Station opened
- 1 January 1968: Station closed
Location

Stanningley railway station, also called Stanningley for Farsley, is a closed railway station in Stanningley, Pudsey, West Yorkshire, England, located about 5 miles (8 km) west of Leeds station. It also served Farsley and Pudsey, the latter namely until the Pudsey Loop was built.

It was opened on 1 August 1854 as a station on the Leeds, Bradford and Halifax Junction Railway, later part of the GNR, from Leeds Central station to Bradford Adolphus Street. On 1 April 1878 a branch from Stanningley to Pudsey Greenside was opened which eventually evolved into the Pudsey loop line railway. Having been renamed into Stanningley for Farsley, the station name reverted to Stanningley in 1961. Stanningley railway station closed on 1 January 1968, while the line itself has remained open, with trains of the Calder Valley Line passing the site of the former station.

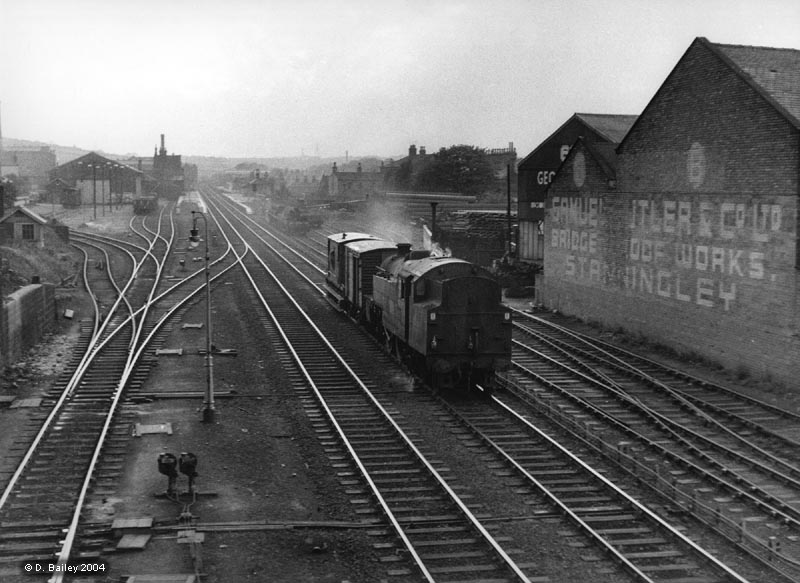
Short freight train passing through Stanningley station in 1966

The station had a sizeable goods yard. The goods shed has survived almost intact and is used by a builders’ merchant, while the station building is used as business premises. In its function as a railway station for Farsley, it has been replaced by New Pudsey railway station which is situated about 1 mile (1.6 km) further west.
