= List of public art in Leeds =

This is a list of public art in Leeds, including statues and other memorials. This list applies only to works of public art on permanent display in an outdoor public space and as such does not include, for example, works in museums.

== Armley ==
Image	Title / subject	Location and coordinates	Date	Artist / designer	Type	Material	Dimensions	Designation	Wikidata	Notes
	Untitled	Armley Park	c. 1897	Burmantofts Pottery	Plaque	Glazed terracotta	1m long	Grade II	Q26547555	
	Untitled	Armley Park	c. 1897	Burmantofts Pottery	Plaque	Glazed terracotta	1m long	Grade II	Q26547552	
More images	War memorial	Armley Park	1921	Sir Charles Nicholson	Cross on supporting pillars and a hexagonal base with plaques	Stone and bronze		Grade II	Q26547558	

== Chapeltown ==
Image	Title / subject	Location and coordinates	Date	Artist / designer	Type	Material	Dimensions	Designation	Wikidata	Notes
	Reflections of Carnival Leeds West Indian Carnival	Savile Mount	2023	Rhian Kempadoo-Millar	Mural		13m × 9m	—N/a	Q124700212	Unveiled 3 October 2023.

== City centre ==
Image	Title / subject	Location and coordinates	Date	Artist / designer	Type	Material	Dimensions	Designation	Wikidata	Notes
More images	Leeds Patronising the Arts and Encouraging the Sciences	Leeds Town Hall	1858	John Thomas	Sculpture relief	Stone		Grade I		
More images	Lions	Leeds Town Hall	1867	William Day Keyworth, Jnr.	4 statues	Portland stone		Grade I		
More images	Leeds Rifles War Memorial	Outside Leeds Minster, Kirkgate	1921	Edwin Lutyens	Cross with bench and inserts	Portland stone and bronze		Grade II	Q26655868	
More images	War memorial	The Headrow	1922	Henry Charles Fehr	Obelisk with 3 statues	Portland stone and bronze	7m tall	Grade II	Q26547390	Architect, Reginald Blomfield
	Putto with Turkey	Leeds Civic Hall	c. 1933	Joseph Hermon Cawthra	Sculpture group	Stone		Grade II*		
	Putto with Goat	Leeds Civic Hall	c. 1933	Joseph Hermon Cawthra	Sculpture group	Stone		Grade II*		
More images	The Dortmund Drayman	Dortmund Square, The Headrow	1980	Arthur Shulze-Engels	Statue	Bronze				
More images	Reclining Women: Elbow	Leeds Art Gallery, The Headrow	1981	Henry Moore	Sculpture	Bronze			Q19759352	
More images	Game of Boules	Bond Court	2000	Roger Burnett	4 figure statue group	Bronze				
More images	Arthur Louis Aaron	Eastgate roundabout, Quarry Hill	2001	Graham Ibbeson	Sculpture group	Bronze				
	The Holbeck Sheep	Marshall Street, Holbeck	2005	Antonia Stowe	Sculpture	Steel, felt and rope				
	Sheaf Tree	Waterloo Street, Brewery Wharf	2005	Chris Knight	Sculpture	Steel				
More images	Steeped Vessels	Brewery Wharf	2006	Ian Randall	Sculpture group	Bronze and stainless steel				
More images	A Reflective Approach	Leeds Dock	2007	Kevin Atherton	Sculpture group	Steel and bronze				
More images	Leeds Song Tunnel	Woodhouse Lane	2013	Adrian Riley	Text artwork	Steel				
More images	Hibiscus Rising	Meadow Lane, Aire Park	2023	Yinka Shonibare	Sculpture	Fibreglass, metal & wood	9.5m tall		Q122463268	
More images	Master of the Universe	University of Leeds	1989	Eduardo Paolozzi	Statue with plaque	Bronze			Q137942502	

=== City Square ===
Image	Title / subject	Location and coordinates	Date	Artist / designer	Type	Material	Dimensions	Designation	Wikidata	Notes
More images	James Watt	Leeds City Square	1898	Henry Charles Fehr	Statue on pedestal	Bronze and granite		Grade II	Q26655856	
More images	Edward, the Black Prince	Leeds City Square	1903	Thomas Brock	Equestrian statue on pedestal	Bronze and granite		Grade II*	Q17533834	
More images	Walter Hook	City Square, Leeds	1903	F.W. Pomeroy	Statue on pedestal	Bronze and granite		Grade II	Q26655854	
More images	Joseph Priestley	Leeds City Square	1903	Alfred Drury	Statue on pedestal	Bronze and granite		Grade II	Q26655864	
More images	Evening	Leeds City Square	1903	Alfred Drury	4 Streetlamps on blocks	Bronze and granite		Grade II		
More images	Morning	Leeds City Square	1903	Alfred Drury	4 Streetlamps on blocks	Bronze and granite		Grade II		
More images	John Harrison	Leeds City Square	1903	Henry Charles Fehr	Statue on pedestal with plaque	Bronze and granite		Grade II	Q26655861	

== Elland Road ==
Image	Title / subject	Location and coordinates	Date	Artist / designer	Type	Material	Dimensions	Designation	Wikidata	Notes
More images	Billy Bremner	Elland Road	1999	Frances Segelman	Statue on pedestal	Bronze				
More images	Don Revie	Elland Road	2012	Graham Ibbeson	Statue on pedestal	Bronze	2.5m tall			

== Headingley ==
Image	Title / subject	Location and coordinates	Date	Artist / designer	Type	Material	Dimensions	Designation	Wikidata	Notes
More images	War memorial	Otley Road / St Michaels Road, Headingley	1921	Sidney Kitson (architect)	Obelisk with panels	Portland stone and bronze		Grade II	Q26547665	

== Mabgate ==
Image	Title / subject	Location and coordinates	Date	Artist / designer	Type	Material	Dimensions	Designation	Wikidata	Notes
	ECHOES	Corner of Mabgate and Argyle Road	2023	Add Fuel	Mural		10m × 9m	—N/a	Q124691518	

== Otley ==
Image	Title / subject	Location and coordinates	Date	Artist / designer	Type	Material	Dimensions	Designation	Wikidata	Notes
More images	Thomas Chippendale	Otley	1987	Graham Ibbeson	Statue on pedestal	Bronze				

== Woodhouse ==
Image	Title / subject	Location and coordinates	Date	Artist / designer	Type	Material	Dimensions	Designation	Wikidata	Notes
More images	Robert Peel	Woodhouse Moor	1852	William Behnes	Statue on pedestal	Bronze and granite		Grade II	Q26655833	Relocated from Victoria Square in 1937
More images	Arthur Wellesley, 1st Duke of Wellington	Woodhouse Moor	1854, erected 1858	Carlo Marochetti	Statue on pedestal	Bronze and granite		Grade II	Q26656015	
More images	Peter Fairbairn	Woodhouse Square	1868	Matthew Noble	Statue on pedestal	Bronze and granite		Grade II	Q26547184	
More images	Henry Rowland Marsden	Woodhouse Moor	1878	John Throp	Statue on pedestal with plaques	Stone and marble		Grade II	Q26547177	
More images	Memorial to Queen Victoria	Woodhouse Moor	1903	George Frampton	Seated statue on column with figures and frieze	Bronze and Portland stone		Grade II*	Q15979175	
