= Greenside Tunnel =

Railway tunnel in West Yorkshire, England

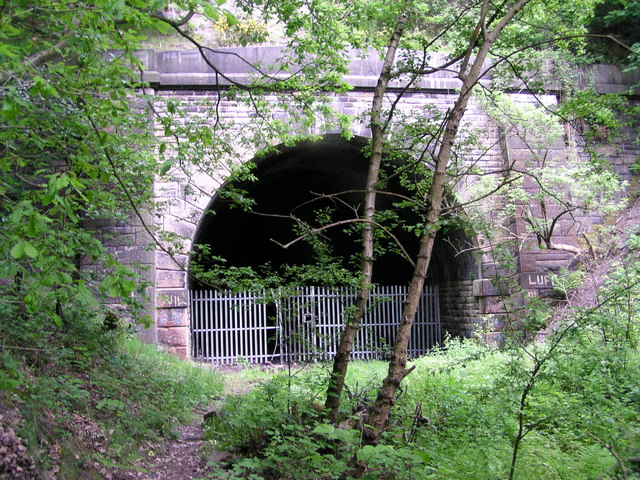
- Western portal in May 2007
- Interactive map of Greenside Tunnel

Overview
- Location: Pudsey
- OS grid reference: SE 21 32
- Status: Disused
- Start: 53°47′23″N 1°40′12″W
- End: 53°47′22″N 1°40′43″W

Operation
- Opened: 1893
- Closed: 15 June 1964
- Operator: GNR, LNER, British Rail
- Traffic: former railway

Technical
- Length: 616 yd (563 m)
- No. of tracks: 2
- Track gauge: 4 ft 8 1/2 in (1,435 mm)

Greenside Tunnel is a former railway tunnel in Pudsey, West Yorkshire, England.

== History ==
Greenside Tunnel was built when the branch line from Stanningley to Pudsey Greenside was extended towards Laisterdyke, resulting in the line known as Pudsey Loop. The tunnel was opened in 1893 as an extension to the railway from the former Pudsey Greenside railway station which was originally built as a terminal station. Since the railway line closed on 15 July 1964, it has been out of use and has been fenced off. Around 2006, planning permission had been granted to fill in the tunnel and the adjoining cuttings, but work has not started yet. Partial landfill has begun as of spring 2018. An application has been made to Leeds city council for complete full landfill as of October 2018, but the tunnel is still clear, as an open day was held in September 2026, allowing people to walk the full length of the tunnel.

== Description ==
The tunnel is located west of the site of Pudsey Greenside railway station and of the bridge leading Carlisle Road across the former line, and east of a bridge of Smalewell Quarry track, beneath the Fox and Grapes public house. It is 616 yd (563 m) long, according to some sources 618 yd (565 m), and led a double-tracked railway beneath a hill on the western side of Pudsey town. The tunnel has not been built in a straight line, but with a slight S-shaped curvature that nevertheless allows to keep at least one entrance in sight at any point of its route. A ventilation shaft had been built about 240 ft (73 m) from its western portal. Its opening was located near today's junction of Westroyd, Windmill Hill, and Smalewell Road, beneath an access road to some garages, but is now capped off.

The eastern portal is located below steep retaining walls on the south side of the approach cutting. Since closure of the line, it has been partly blocked by tipped spoil. The lining consists of masonry side walls with a height of about 7 ft (2.1 m), the roof arch has been constructed from engineering brick. Throughout the tunnel, amply-sized refuges in brick have been provided at regular intervals. The western portal is built from stone with buttresses and wing walls to each side.
