= Bramley Park, Leeds =

Park in Bramley, Leeds, England

Bramley Park
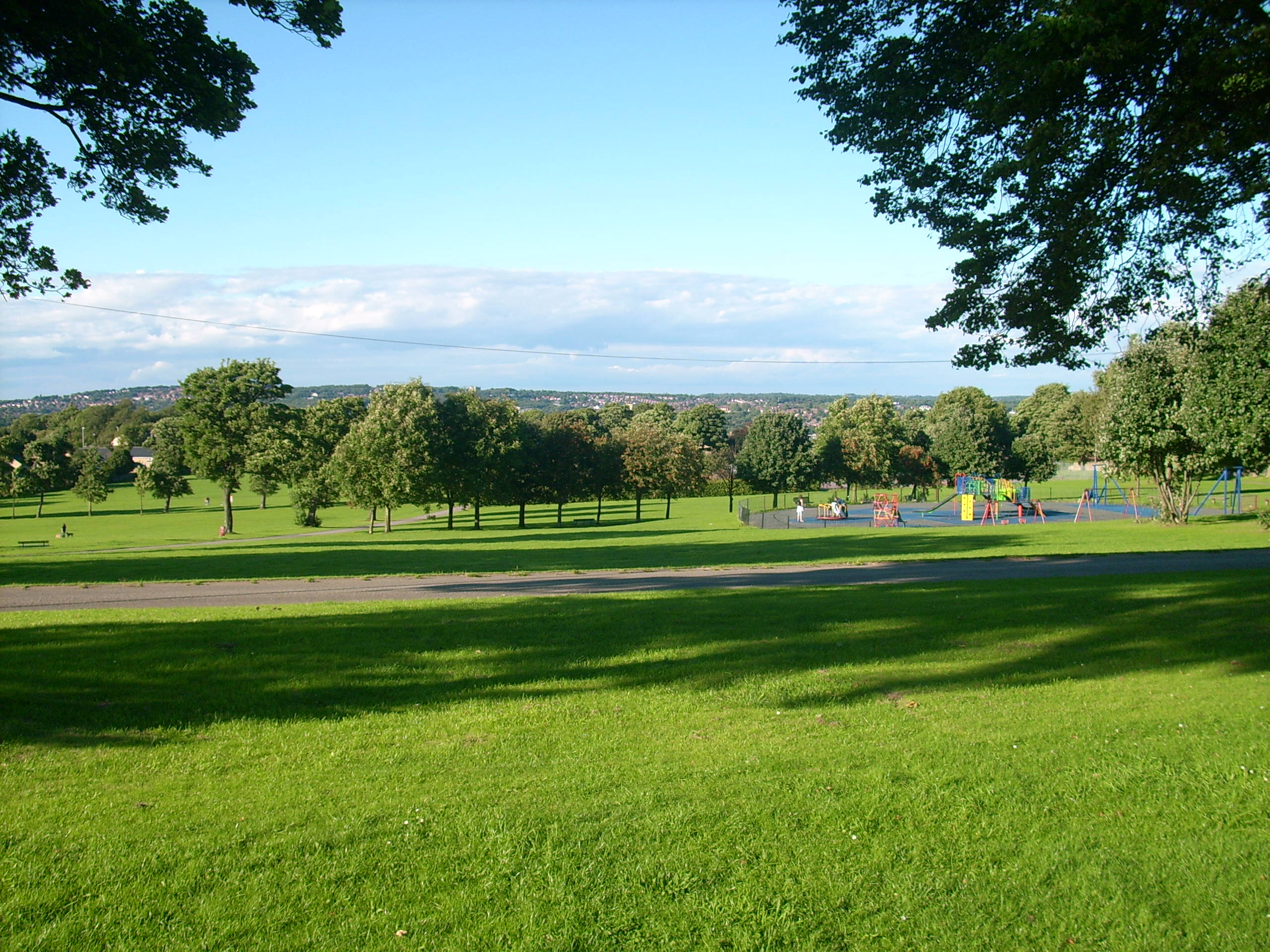
- Open parkland at Bramley Park
- Interactive map of Bramley Park
- Location: Leeds, West Yorkshire
- Coordinates: 53.812°N 1.638°W
- Operator: Leeds City Council

Bramley Park is a community park situated near the centre of Bramley, four miles west of Leeds city centre, West Yorkshire, England.

The park contains open spaces, sports pitches, tennis courts, a bowling green, a playground, a war memorial, a formal garden and a parkrun route. Annual events such as "Bramley Carnival" and a fireworks display are also hosted in the park.

The war memorial was erected in 2014 in rememberence of soldiers from Bramley, Rodley and Stanningley who died in combat between 1900 and 2011.

== See also ==
- Bramley Fall Park, another public park also in Bramley.
