= Ann Husler =

British quarry owner (1803–1874)

Ann Husler (1803–1874), née Procter, was a quarry owner and stone merchant based in Weetwood, Leeds, in West Yorkshire. She ran a quarry business after the death of her husband, John Husler. She ran the business until her death at the age of 71, after which she left her share of the business to one of her sons.

== Early life ==
Ann Husler, née Procter, was born in February 1803 in Armley, Leeds, England to James and Mary Procter, and was baptized on 20 February 1803. Her father was a cloth maker, originally from Headingley

She married John Husler (1802–1853) at the age of 19 on 15 April 1822 at Leeds Parish Church, signing the register with a cross. She had her first child, a daughter named Mary, in that same year on 4 November 1822. They proceeded to have eleven more children over the course of twenty years, although three died in childhood.

== Career ==
John Husler came from a family of quarrymen and stone masons. Quarrying quickly became a major industry as a result of the Industrial Revolution, as the need for materials to construct public works like bridges, railways and docks grew, as well as new buildings for home and work in urban and rural areas. Husler saw this demand, and after running a quarry at Woodhouse, Leeds, leased sandstone quarries at Weetwood in 1840 with his business partner, John Cliff. As their business expanded they rented a wharf in Leeds and in London, on the Isle of Dogs, to transport their stone.

John Cliff left the business in 1846, and John Husler expanded it by securing key contracts for his stone, such as Armley Gaol (now known as HM Prison Leeds), which was completed in 1847 and the stonework for the new Leeds Industrial Schools, now part of St. James's Hospital.

In 1849 John Husler moved his family to a large house, Victoria House, in Weetwood Mill Lane, and began the building of a row of workers' cottages, known now as Hustler's Row, on the other side of the stream from his quarry (Meanwood Park). He also built a larger terrace, Victoria Terrace, off the Otley Road, for rent.

In 1851, he won the contract to build the Kilkenny to Waterford railway in Ireland. While he was in Ireland working on this project with his local business partner, William Ellis, Ann ran the quarry businesses in Leeds in his stead.

When John died suddenly in 1853 in Waterford, leaving Ann widowed still with young children to care for, she continued to manage the Leeds business single-handedly, and also handled the disputes over his estate due to litigation over the debts he took on for the railway project.

From 1853 to 1874, Ann Husler expanded the quarry business, and by 1860 she employed 75 men and 18 boys in the quarries. That same year, she renewed her lease of 93 acres at Weetwood for 21 years, which included the quarries. The quarries were described at the time as extensive and valuable and the stone was 'especially adapted for Docks, Bridges, Engine Beds, and other Heavy Works and has been extensively used in several of the most important Works in the Country.’

The stone from the Weetwood quarries was in high demand during this period, and it was used, for example, to build Westminster Bridge, which took 8 years to build from 1854 to 1862.

She brought two of her sons, Joseph and Alfred, into the family business, but Joseph moved to Australia in 1870 with his family. Her other son Alfred, who was profoundly deaf, continued as her partner in the business until her death when she left her share of the business to him. She died on 3 January 1874, aged 71. She was buried with her husband and their three children who had died in infancy at Bramley Zion Baptist Chapel

The lease on the quarries at Weetwood expired at the beginning of 1881: the quarries were closed and all the heavy plant and equipment was sold by auction in April 1881 The quarries were said to have become 'an eyesore' in what was becoming a residential area of large mansions and villas, and the intention was to landscape and plant the area to become 'a place of beauty' The quarries now form part of the park known as 'The Hollies'.

Husler started out life without means or education, as demonstrated by her having to sign her marriage entry in the register with a cross. Yet she went on to manage a large business in a time where the industry was largely dominated by men, with skill, enterprise, and success.
