= Bramley railway station (West Yorkshire) =

Railway station in West Yorkshire, England

Bramley (West Yorkshire)
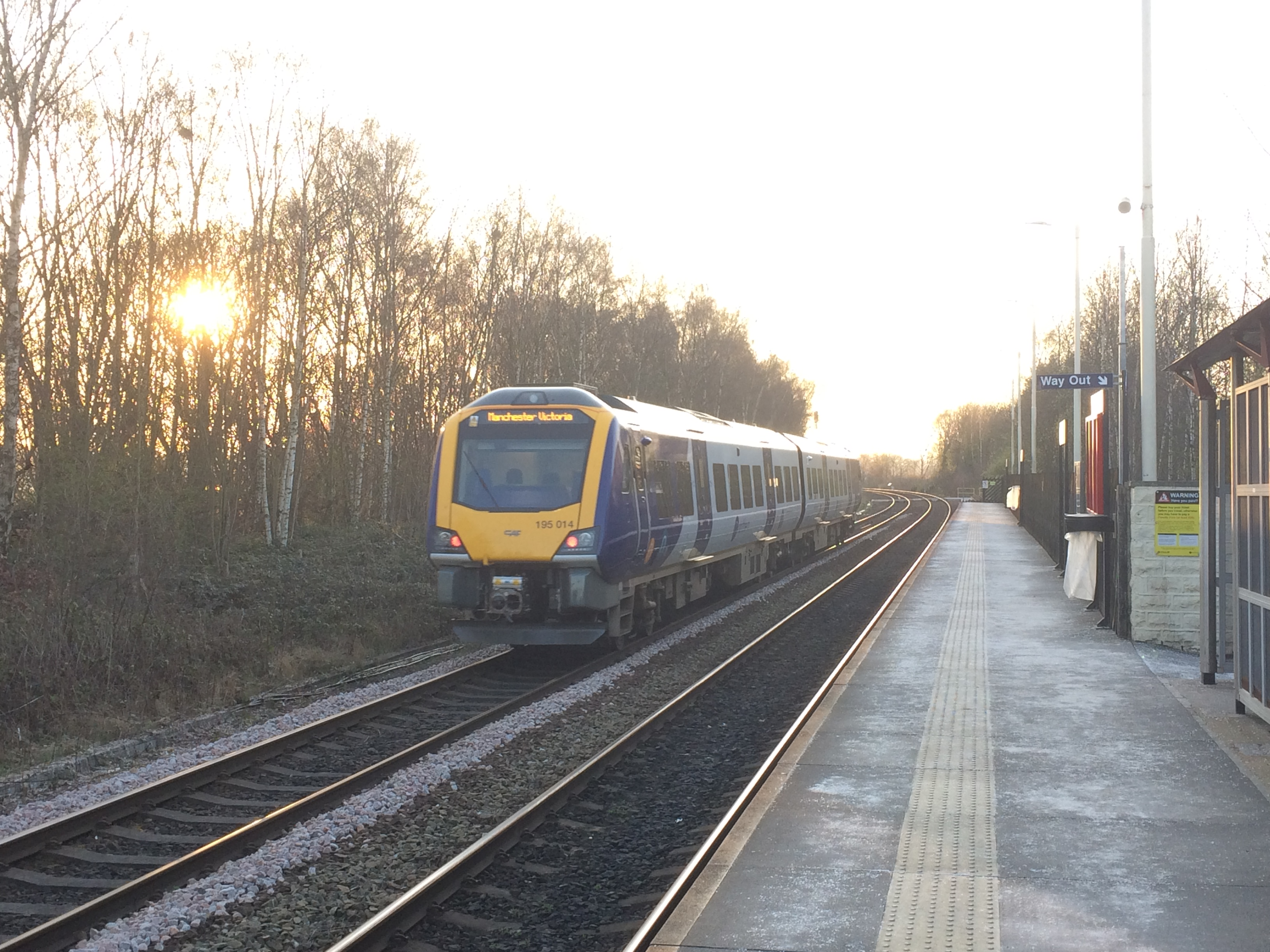
- Class 195 DMU no. 195014 on Leeds-Manchester Victoria service passing through Bramley station in March 2020

General information
- Location: Bramley, City of Leeds; England
- Coordinates: 53.80558°N 1.63792°W
- Grid reference: SE239344
- Managed by: Northern
- Transit authority: West Yorkshire (Metro)
- Platforms: 2

Other information
- Station code: BLE
- Fare zone: 2
- Classification: DfT category F1

History
- Original company: Leeds, Bradford and Halifax Junction Railway
- Pre-grouping: Great Northern Railway
- Post-grouping: London and North Eastern Railway

Key dates
- 1 August 1854: Station opened
- 4 July 1966: Station closed
- 12 September 1983: Station reopened

Passengers
- 2020/21: ▼71,306
- 2021/22: ▲0.196 million
- 2022/23: ▲0.258 million
- 2023/24: ▲0.297 million
- 2024/25: ▲0.336 million
Location
Notes
- Passenger statistics from the Office of Rail and Road

Bramley railway station serves the suburb of Bramley, Leeds, England. It lies on the Calder Valley line 4 miles (6 km) west from Leeds.

== History ==
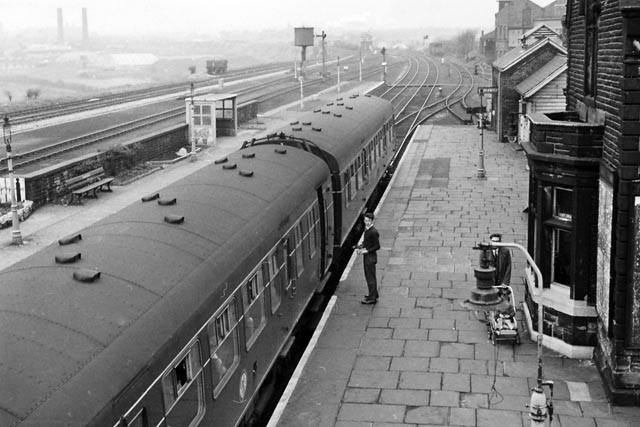
The original station in April 1961

The original station was opened by the Leeds, Bradford and Halifax Junction Railway on 1 August 1854. This was closed by British Railways on 4 July 1966, the last trains having called on 2 July. The station had platforms opposite each other and were connected by a footbridge.

The present station off Stanningley Road opened on 12 September 1983 by Metro (West Yorkshire Passenger Transport Executive) and British Rail. The station's two wooden platforms are staggered, and cost £125,000 (equivalent to £407,000 in 2023).

== Facilities ==
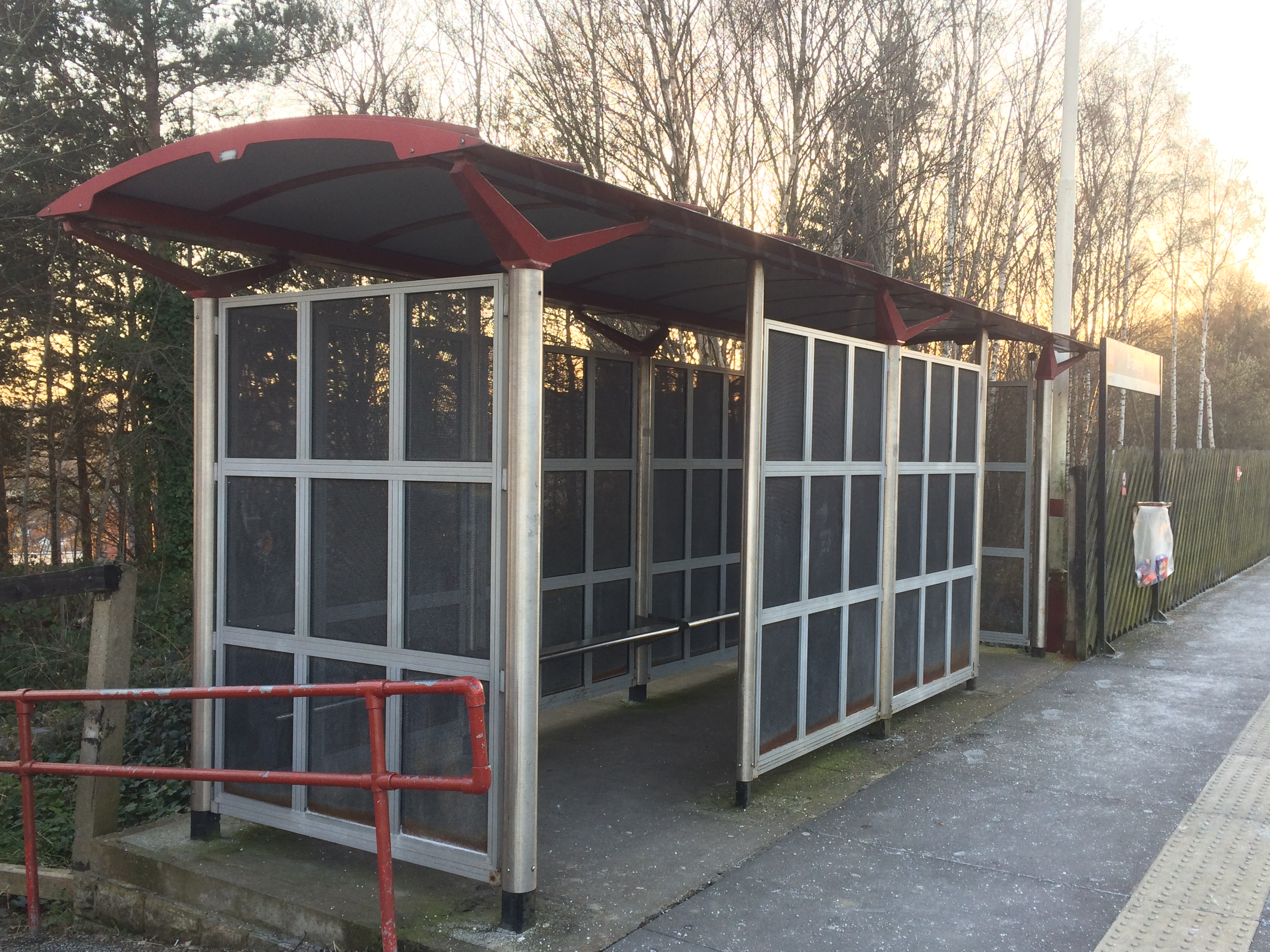
Waiting shelter on platform 1 in March 2020

The station is not staffed and has a ticket machine on platform 2 as of spring 2019. There are shelters and passenger information screens on each platform, along with a system to provide train running information. Though there are ramps to each platform, disabled access to platform 2 is restricted by the path being narrow and opening out onto a busy main road.

== Services ==
Monday to Saturday daytimes, three trains per hour head eastbound towards Leeds, with one continuing to Selby and Hull. Westbound the frequency is similar, with trains heading to Bradford Interchange and Halifax. Two of three go beyond Halifax to Manchester Victoria, whilst the third terminates there (passengers for Brighouse and Huddersfield now need to change trains at Bradford Interchange on weekdays). One Manchester service now runs through to Chester via Warrington Bank Quay since the May 2019 timetable update.

There is an additional 4th [train per hour] that runs Mon-Fri eastbound, just before 8am, which is operated by Grand Central on behalf of Northern - as such, tickets cannot be purchased on this service.

On Sundays there are two trains per hour towards Leeds and to Bradford Interchange. One westbound service runs through to Manchester and the other runs to Huddersfield.

The Northern service to Preston passes through Bramley but does not stop there.

Preceding station	National Rail	Following station
New Pudsey	Northern; Caldervale Line	Leeds
	Historical railways	
Stanningley	Great Northern Railway (Great Britain); Leeds, Bradford & Halifax Junction Railway	Armley Moor
