= Pudsey loop railway =

Disused railway line in West Yorkshire, England

The Pudsey loop was a railway line in the former West Riding of Yorkshire, England, which served the town of Pudsey and later offered a second connection between Bramley in the east and Laisterdyke and Dudley Hill in the west, in addition to the existing line between Leeds and Bradford Exchange station.

It was opened by the Great Northern Railway as a dead-end branch from Stanningley to Pudsey in 1877. However there was demand for a better connection with the main line network, and the line was extended to make a through route. Considerable earthworks and a tunnel made this a difficult work to execute. The line opened in 1895 and became used as a through route, as an alternative to the earlier line.

Declining use eventually led to closure in 1964.

== Demand for a railway ==
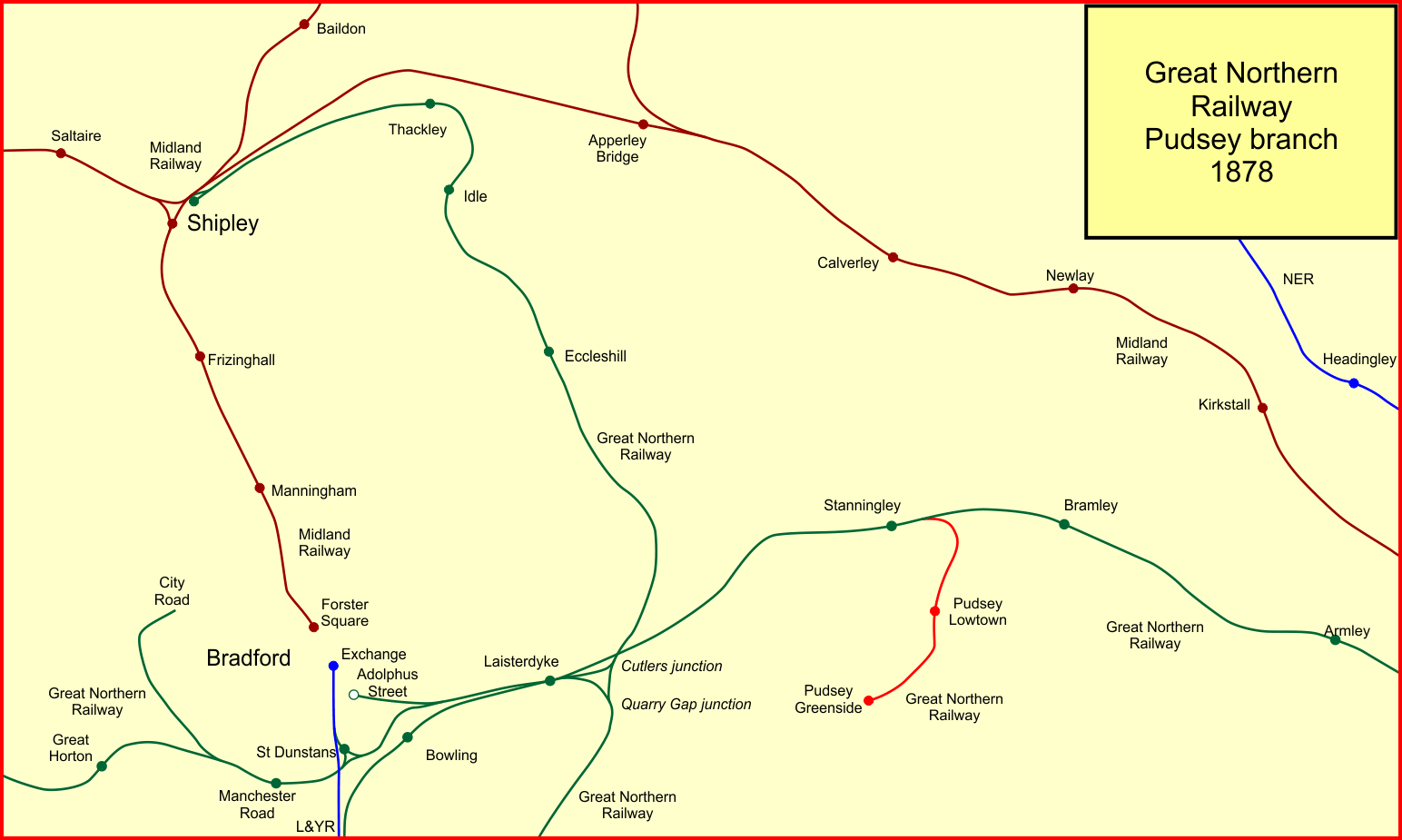
The GNR Pudsey branch in 1878

The Great Northern Railway route between Leeds and Bradford had been built by the Leeds, Bradford and Halifax Junction Railway and opened in 1854. The GNR operated the trains from the outset, and took it over in 1863. There is a promontory at Pudsey rising to 577 feet above sea level, and the LB&HJR avoided the engineering difficulty, routing its line through Stanningley, a mile to the north.

Deputations from Pudsey had been protesting to the GNR and its predecessor since 1856 about the inconvenience arising from the remoteness of the railway station. By the 1870s Pudsey had a population of almost 15,000 and was a thriving centre for woollen manufacture, stone quarrying and coal working. The GNR decided that a railway connection to Pudsey was now essential, and on 24 July 1871 a short branch line was authorised. The authorised route was to make a triangular junction with the Leeds to Bradford line between Bramley and Stanningley.

== Construction and opening ==
In fact the GNR were cautious about the commercial value of the branch, and at first only the curve towards Stanningley was made. Work started on 24 November 1876. Land was taken for a double line and bridges made to suit that, but at first only a single line was installed. The line began in a dock platform at Stanningley, and was 1 mile 62 chains (2.9 km) in length to a terminus at Pudsey Greenside. The connection was therefore west-facing.

The intermediate station at Pudsey Lowtown (often spelt Low Town) was on a gradient of 1 in 50 (20 ‰) falling towards Stanningley. The Board of Trade inspecting officer refused to sanction opening of the station until a second platform with a shelter, and a loop line with catch points had been provided. (In fact most of the branch was on a 1 in 50 (20 ‰) gradient towards Pudsey). Goods traffic on the line began in the summer of 1877, (Note: The date is uncertain.) and a service of 15 passenger trains each way on weekdays only between Stanningley and Pudsey Greenside began on 1 April 1878. The single line was worked on the train staff and ticket system.

The timetable had been printed before the company knew of the ban on use of Low Town, so it showed the trains as calling there. Pudsey Lowtown station was modified in accordance with the Inspecting Officer's requirements, and it opened in July 1878. Parliamentary estimates had been £44,771 but the actual expenditure was eventually reckoned at £103,044, the excess being attributed to extensions at Stanningley, work at Low Town, an extension of Greenside station, cost of the Bramley branch, and doubling the line.

== Extending the line ==
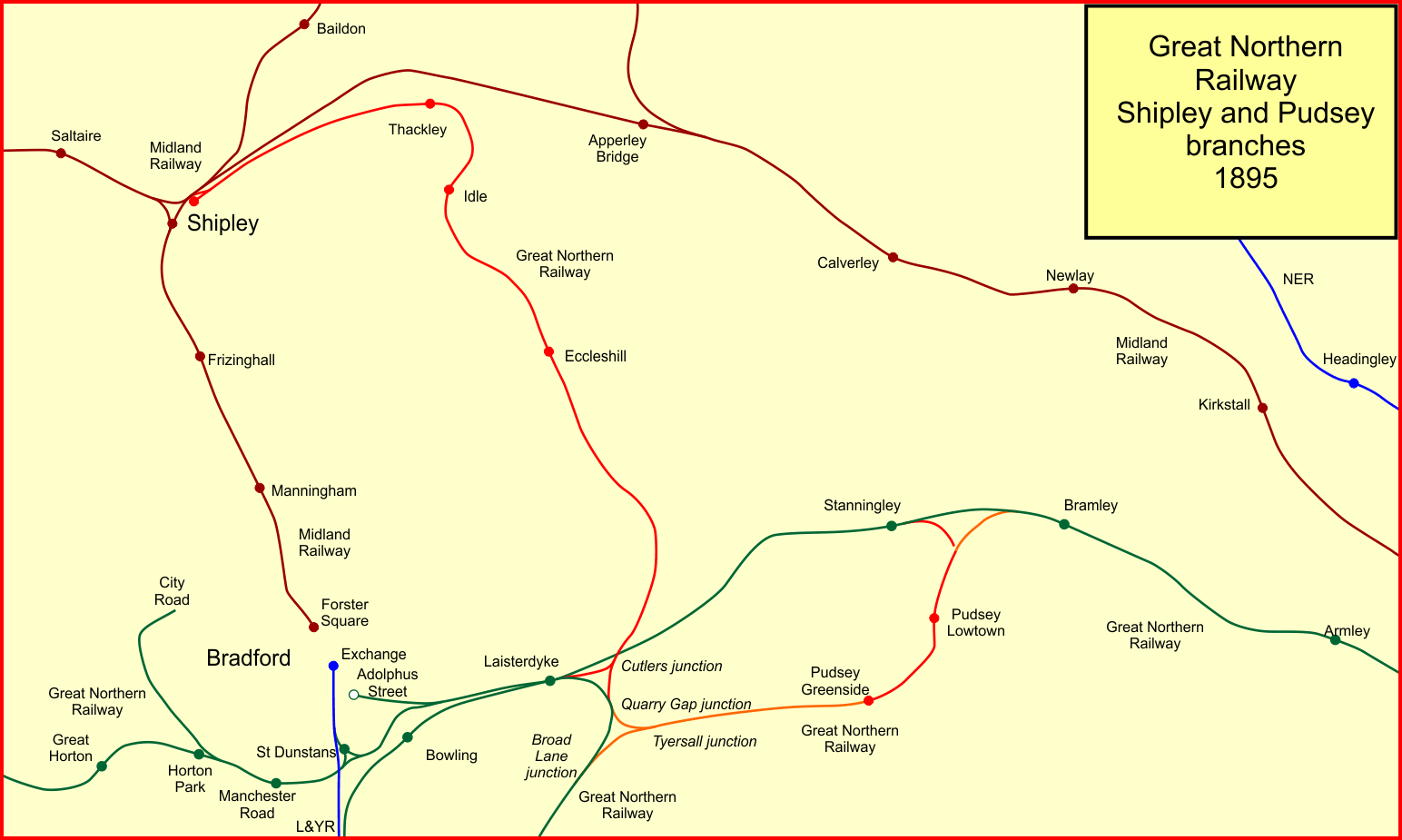
The GNR Pudsey and Shipley branches in 1895

In 1882 the Great Northern Railway and the Lancashire and Yorkshire Railway came to an agreement to co-operate over routes and services in which they both had an interest. This made possible a scheme to provide a direct curve from Bramley to the Pudsey branch, an extension from Pudsey Greenside to a double junction with the Ardsley line north of Dudley Hill, and a link from Dudley Hill to Low Moor. This created a new route through Pudsey making a direct line to the Spen Valley Line, as well as a loop line providing an alternative Leeds to Bradford connection. The authorising Act for the work was granted on 16 July 1885.

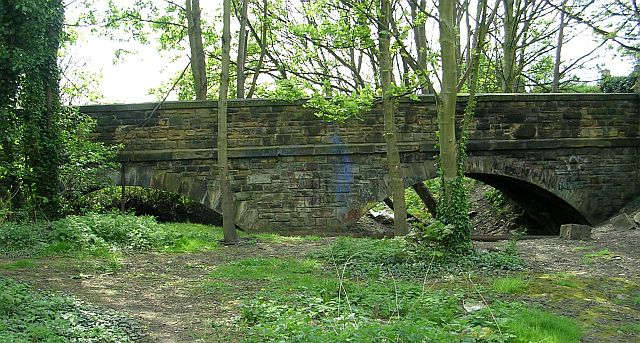
Bridge across the former line near Pudsey Lowtown in April 2007

Lack of capital delayed construction, and the Pudsey loop line became operative on 1 December 1893 with the opening of the new (east-facing) curve at Bramley and the extension to Cutlers Junction, near Laisterdyke. The construction ran through the 616 yard Greenside Tunnel and across what was claimed to be the highest embankment in the country. The Stanningley connection of the original branch was severed at the south (Pudsey) junction and the curve made into a siding from Stanningley; the line was accessed directly from the Leeds direction via Bramley. At the western end, the opening through to Low Moor took place on 1 December 1893, with the loop lienm itself. An unusual circular passenger service was introduced: from Leeds Central trains ran through Pudsey, Low Moor, the L&YR Spen Valley stations, Thornhill, and over the Headfield junction spur to Dewsbury Central and Batley. From here the journey returned to Leeds by means of the line to Beeston junction via Tingley. The service started with six trains in one direction and seven in the other, the GNR working nine of them and the L&YR the other four. They took up to 90 minutes to cover the 30 miles (48 km).

== Closure ==
The former Great Northern Railway network in West Yorkshire was reviewed in the early 1960s. Passenger and goods carryings had fallen substantially since the 1920s, and a decision was taken to close the Pudsey loop line. It closed completely on 15 June 1964.

A park and ride station was later provided (on 6 March 1967) on the Leeds - Bradford main line; it was named "New Pudsey".

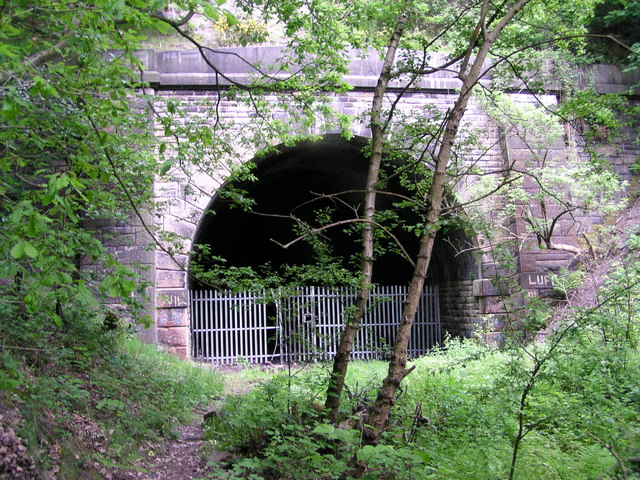
Western portal of Greenside Tunnel in May 2007

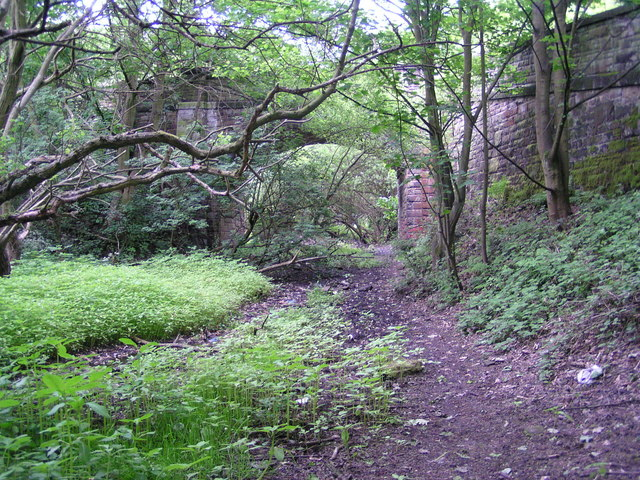
Bridge west of Greenside Tunnel in May 2007

== Current situation ==
Any traces of the line between Bramley station and Mount Pleasant Road have been lost due to the construction of an industrial estate and of Stanningley Bypass. Sections of trackbed are preserved and can be walked between Mount Pleasant Road and Pudsey Lowtown and between the locations of the two Pudsey stations. The site of Pudsey Greenside station is now occupied by warehouses, however remains of the stations glazed interior brickwork is still visible .

Tracks and ballast have been removed in the tunnel and along the whole line. Some bridges in the course of the embankment between Pudsey and Cutlers Junction have been removed, and the cutting below Arkwright Lane has been filled in.

== See also ==
The Great Northern Railway in Yorkshire
