= Bramley, Leeds =

Area of Leeds, West Yorkshire, England

Coordinates: 53.8124°N 1.6285°W

Bramley
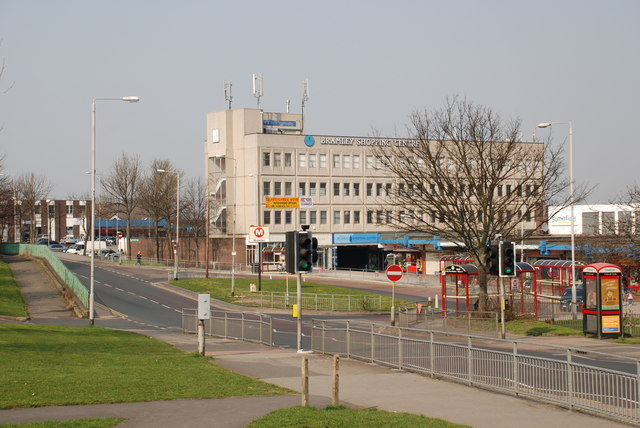
- Bramley Shopping Centre and bus station

- Location within West Yorkshire
- OS grid reference: SE241344
  - London: 170 mi (270 km) SSE
- Metropolitan borough: City of Leeds
- Metropolitan county: West Yorkshire
- Region: Yorkshire and the Humber
- Country: England
- Sovereign state: United Kingdom
- Post town: Leeds
- Postcode district: LS13
- Dialling code: 0113
- Police: West Yorkshire
- Fire: West Yorkshire
- Ambulance: Yorkshire
- UK Parliament: Leeds West and Pudsey

Bramley is a district in west Leeds, West Yorkshire, England. It is part of the City of Leeds electoral ward of Bramley and Stanningley, which had a population of 21,334 at the 2011 census. It is an old industrial area, with much 19th century architecture and 20th century council housing in the east, and private suburban housing in the west.

== Etymology ==
Bramley is recorded in the 1086 Domesday Book as Brameleia and Bramelei. The name derives from the Old English words brōm ('broom') and lēah ('open land in a wood'). The name once meant 'open land characterised by broom'.

== History ==
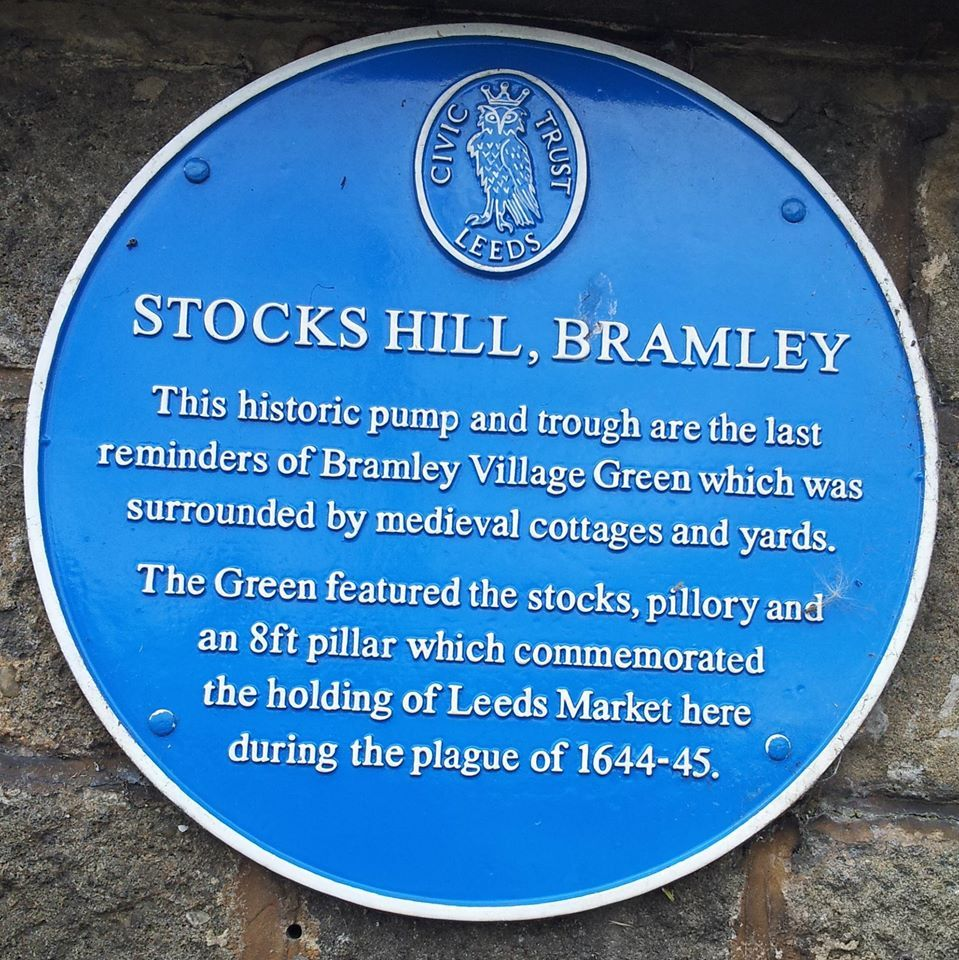
Blue plaque on Stocks Hill

At the time of the Domesday survey, the nucleus of the settlement was probably located at Stocks Hill, and it developed in a linear fashion along today's Town Street. The surviving water pump and stone water trough on Stocks Hill remain from Bramley's medieval past. A blue plaque states "Stocks Hill, Bramley. This historic pump and trough are the last reminders of Bramley Village Green which was surrounded by medieval cottages and yards. The Green featured the stocks, pillory and an eight feet high pillar which commemorated the holding of Leeds Market here during the plague of 1644–45."

Bramley experienced an industrial boom and associated population increase in the 19th century, mostly because of the development of the woollen textile industry in the early part of the century, quarrying and because of the boot making and engineering industries in its later part. The antiquarian Benjamin Wilson wrote a history of Bramley, published in 1860. He donated his collection to Leeds City Museum, including a witch's bottle found in White Coat (White Cote), Bramley in 1861.

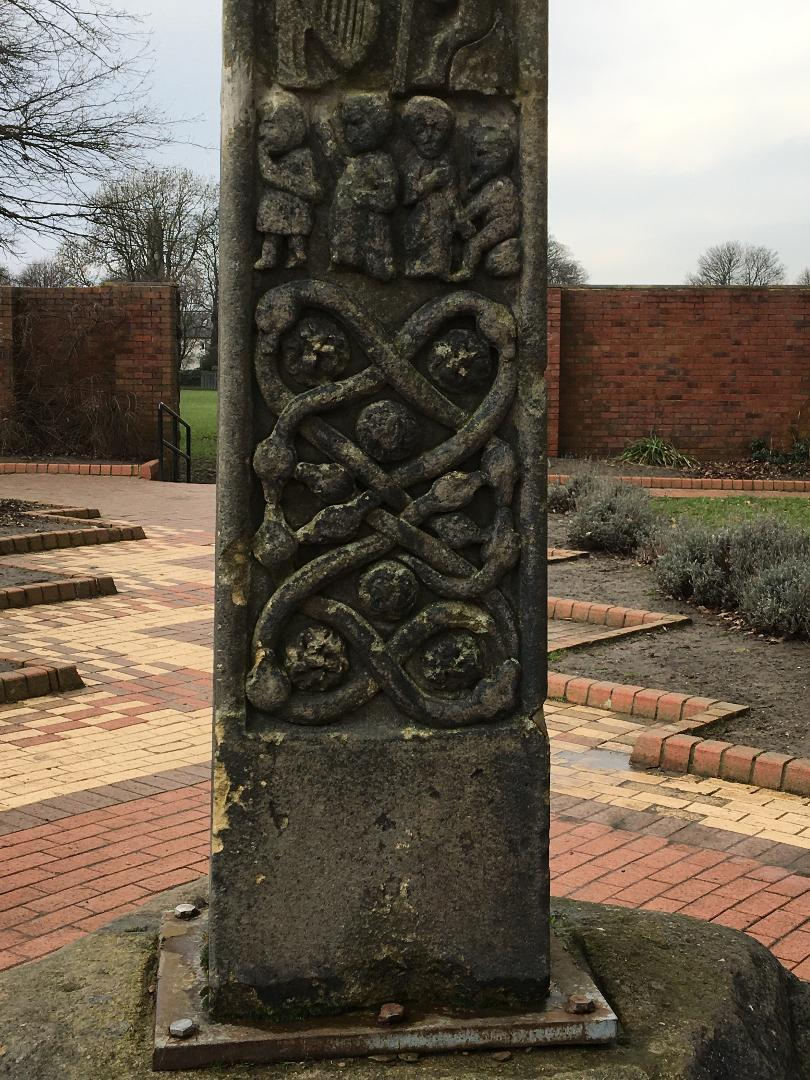
Bramley Cross carving in the Anglo Saxon style

In 1873, bishop John Gott and H. M. Gott erected a stone cross with Anglo Saxon-style carving to celebrate eight years of living and working in Bramley; it now stands in a walled garden, although in the 1980s it stood at the park entrance. Nearby, on Town Street, is the old house that dates back to 1480.

In the early 1960s, a geological survey on behalf of Leeds Corporation of land to be developed at Gamble Hill towards Farnley, discovered past workings for Elland Flags not shown on historic maps. Subsequent investigations found the area riddled with late-eighteenth century shafts and cavities. Plans for the layout of the proposed housing estate, in particular the siting of high rise blocks, had to be altered.

Mary Gawthorpe described her experience living and working at Hough Lane School in Bramley between 1905 and 1907 in her autobiography. She recalls: "Bramley was an oasis of peace, and old established centre of homes and living yet within the city bounds... from our kitchen at Warrel's Mount we looked out on open fields. The walk to school was almost rural in its calm."

Much of Bramley was redeveloped in the 1960s and 1970s in an unsympathetic manner that damaged the historic integrity of the area and altered the appearance and the character of the town significantly. Bramley Shopping Centre was Leeds' second purpose-built town centre after Seacroft town centre. Unlike Seacroft, Bramley Shopping Centre replaced an existing town centre, including many shops and cottages that were dilapidated and in need of repair. From 2008, following a time of deterioration of the shopping centre, new anchor stores such as Farmfoods and Tesco took over existing premises or occupied new ones in the course of a general refit.

The redevelopment of Bramley was condemned by English Heritage as one of the least sensitive redevelopment programmes in Yorkshire. In 2008 the Yorkshire Evening Post ran an article describing the redevelopment of a "once-picturesque area", and questioning the replacement of an historic Yorkshire town centre. Much of historical Bramley is now protected within the Bramley Town Conservation Area, which focuses on the area around Bramley Park across to Hough Lane.

== Governance ==
Bramley was formerly a township and chapelry in the parish of Leeds. In 1866 Bramley became a separate civil parish, which was then abolished on 26 March 1904 to form Armley and Bramley. In 1901 the parish had a population of 17,299.

Bramley is in the Parliamentary constituency of Leeds West and Pudsey. The Member of Parliament is Rachel Reeves.

== Community ==
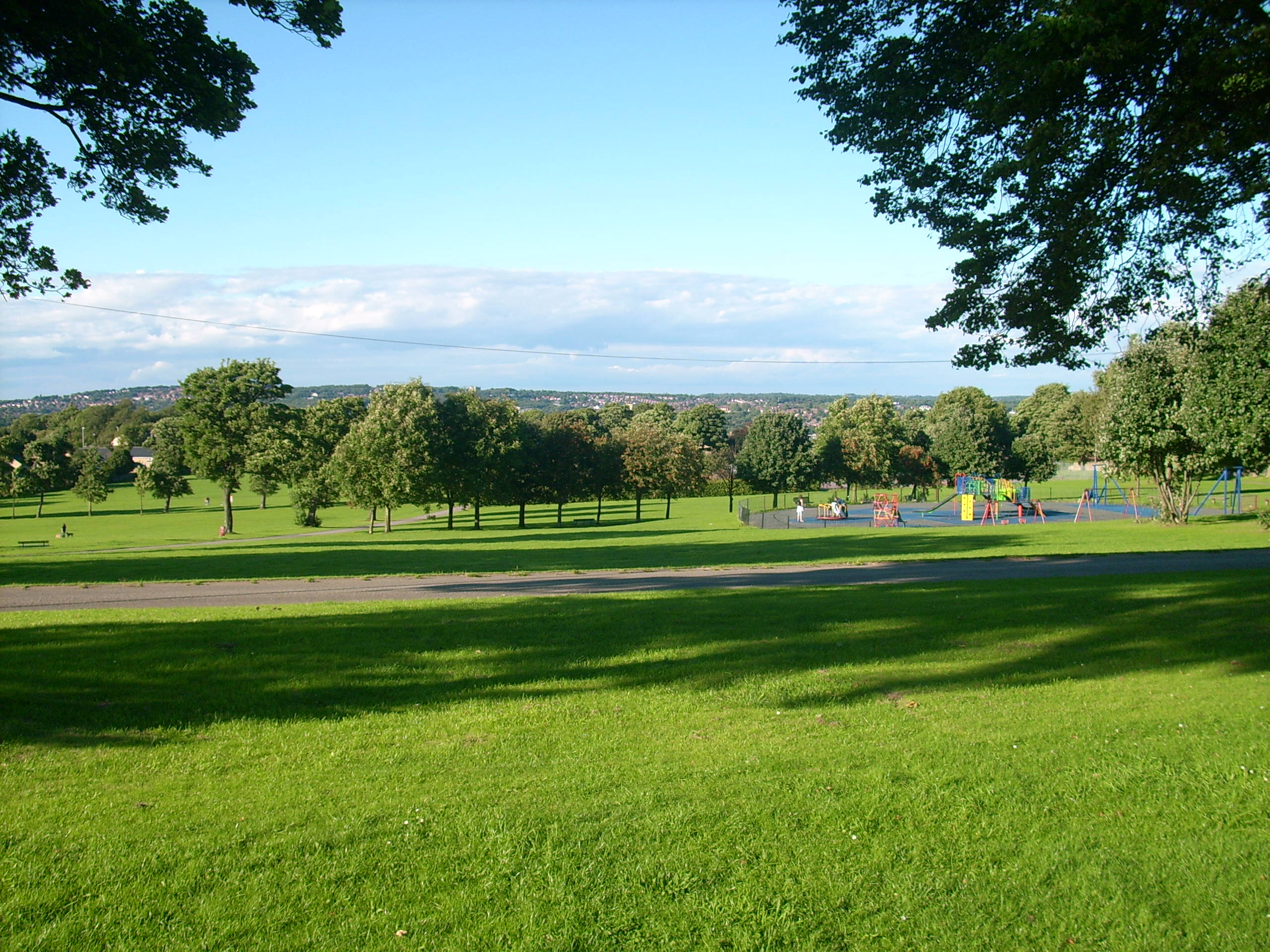
Bramley Park

Parks and open areas for outdoor recreation include Bramley Falls Wood, which runs beside the Leeds and Liverpool Canal, and Bramley Park, which contains an underground reservoir at its highest point. At Bramley Park a fireworks display and the Bramley Carnival were held most years. The carnival stopped in 2014, and the last fireworks were in 2019.

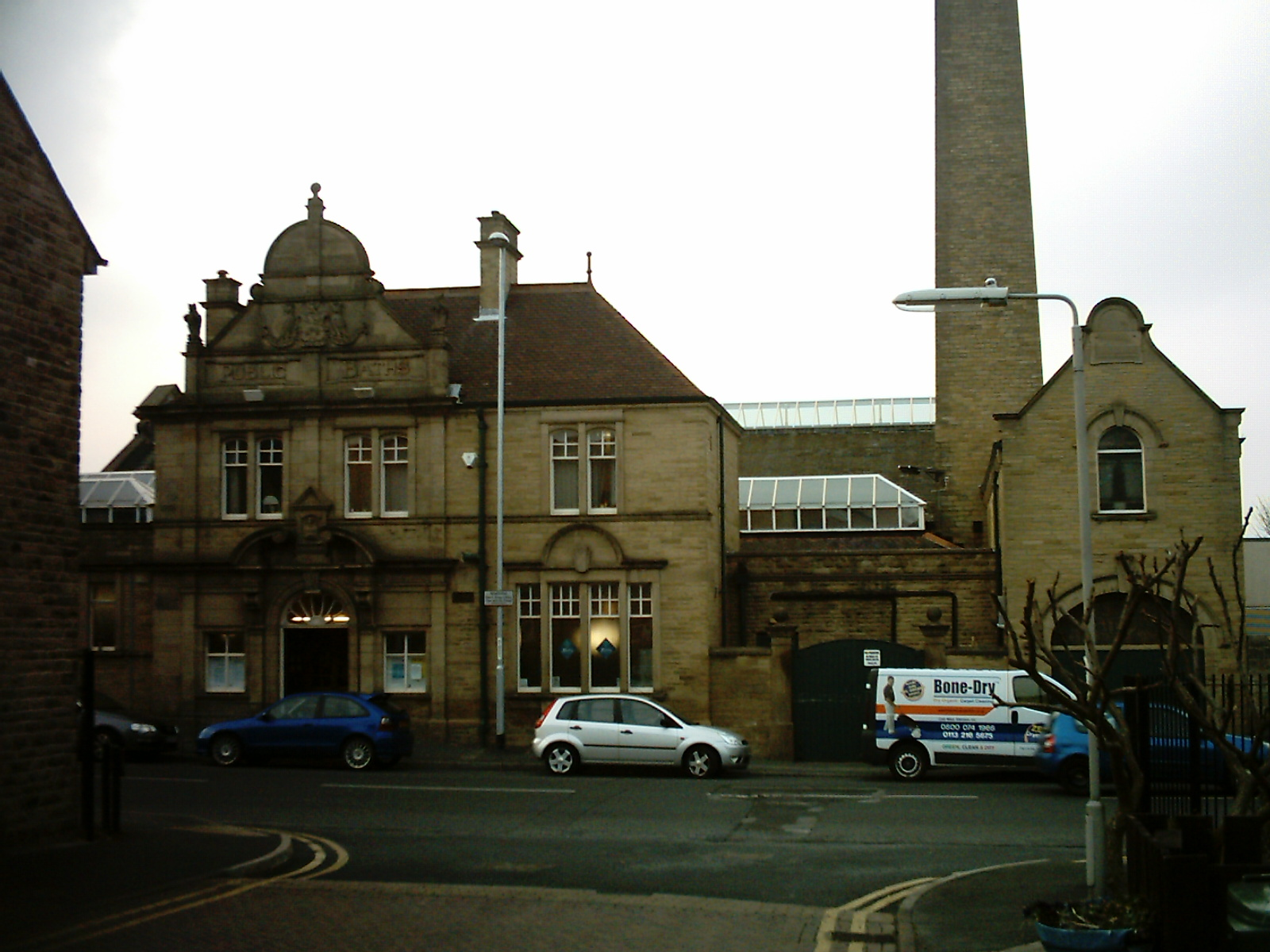
Bramley Baths

Bramley Baths is an example of an Edwardian swimming baths. Built in 1904, and restored, it has a 25-yard pool, a gym and a Russian steam room. The baths were used for dances during its early years, when the pool was covered with a large dance floor. The baths are the only remaining example of an Edwardian era bathhouse in Leeds and have Grade II listed status. The baths were built on the site of an iron foundry and the chimney, built with more than 8,000 Kirkstall bricks, towers over the baths and can be seen across Leeds. The four Georgian-style houses built c. 1803 to the right of the baths were the original homes of the iron foundry owner and his three children.

Bramley Shopping Centre is a 1960s-style concrete shopping plaza which was erected to replace the traditional stone-built village centre. Shops include charity shops, banks, bakeries, pawnbrokers, supermarkets, a post office, a dental practice, beauty salons and fast food takeaways.

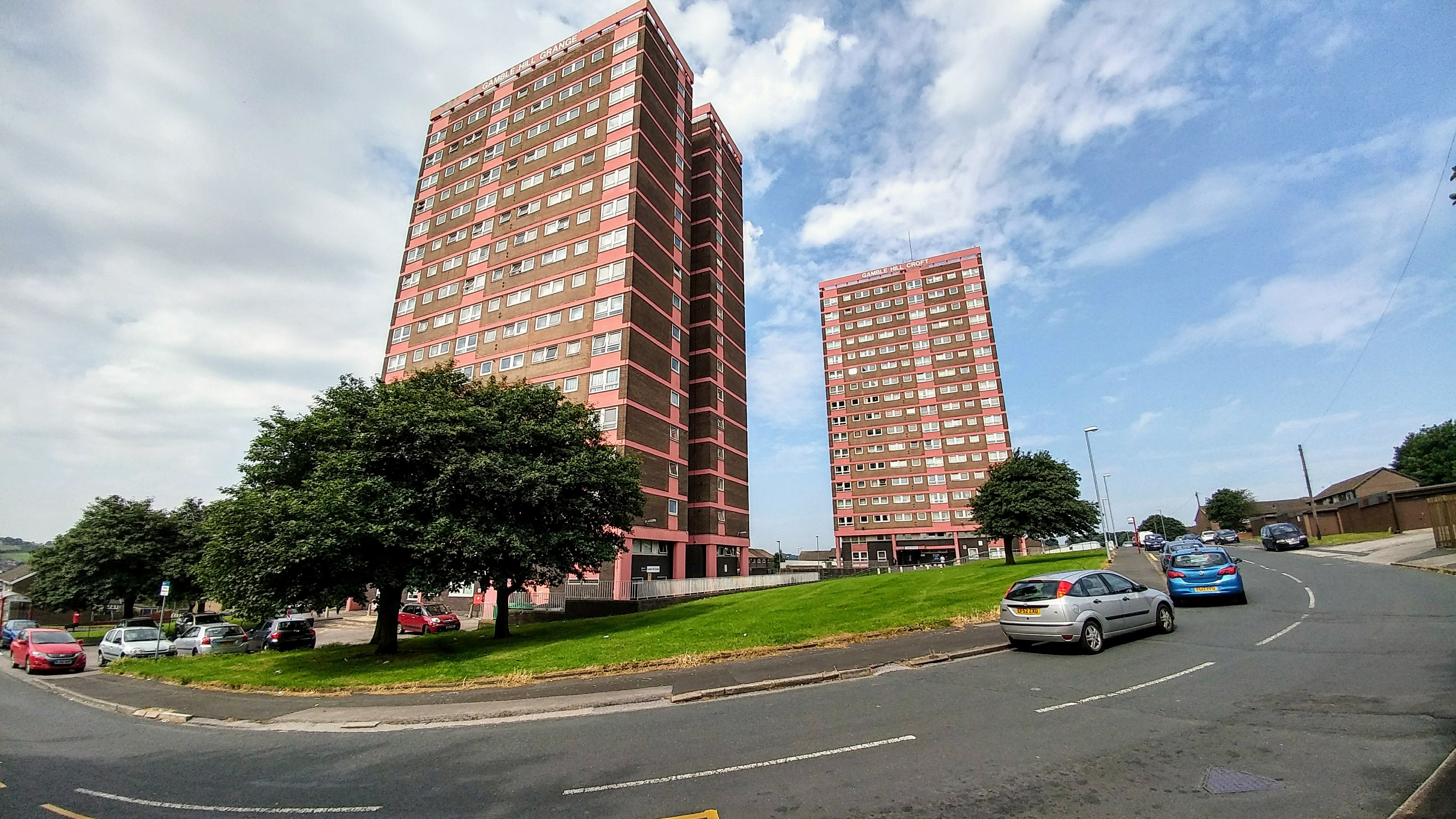
Gamble Hill estate

Estates in Bramley which have residents' associations include Moorside and Ganners, Landseer, Rossefield, and Newlay and Whitecote. LILAC, an affordable green co-housing project, is based in Bramley.

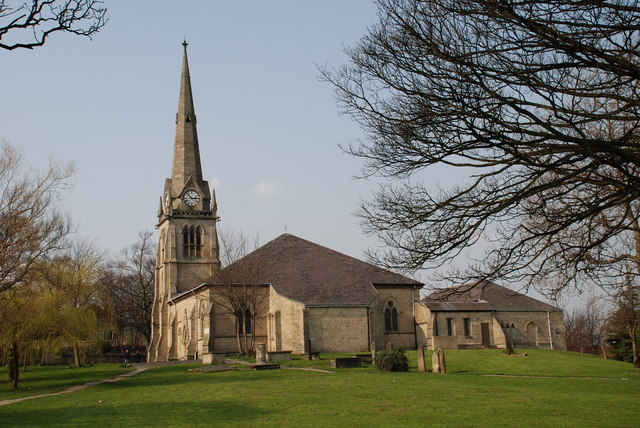
St Peter's Parish Church (Anglican)

Bramley places of worship include Baptist, Roman Catholics, Jehovah's Witnesses, and Methodist (Trinity Methodist Church), and two Anglican churches, St Peter's (pictured) and St Margaret's. St Margaret's Church Hall is registered with Leeds City Council as an asset of community value.

== Public transport ==
Bramley railway station off Stanningley Road is on the Leeds-Bradford Line between Leeds railway station and New Pudsey. Bramley bus station is in the shopping centre.

== Sport ==
Bramley RLFC were founded in 1879, their earliest permanent ground was Barley Mow which hosted New Zealand on their tour of Great Britain in 1907. Bramley joined the Northern Union in 1896. The club moved to McLaren Field in 1965 where they stayed until 1995 after being forced to leave due to financial difficulties. They played at Clarence Field and Headingley Rugby Stadium before folding in 1999.

A new club, Bramley Buffaloes, was set up in 2000. Their bids to rejoin the RFLs professional ranks were denied but they were eventually entered into National League Three in 2004. In 2012 the club applied to join the newly-formed National Conference League but had their application rejected and instead entered the Yorkshire Men's League.

Bramley Phoenix RUFC was formed in 1921 and play home games at Warrels Mount ground. They currently play in Yorkshire Counties leagues.

Bramley Juniors Football Club was established 1994 and runs with open-age teams. The club developed from one under-9s club in 1994.

== Notable people ==
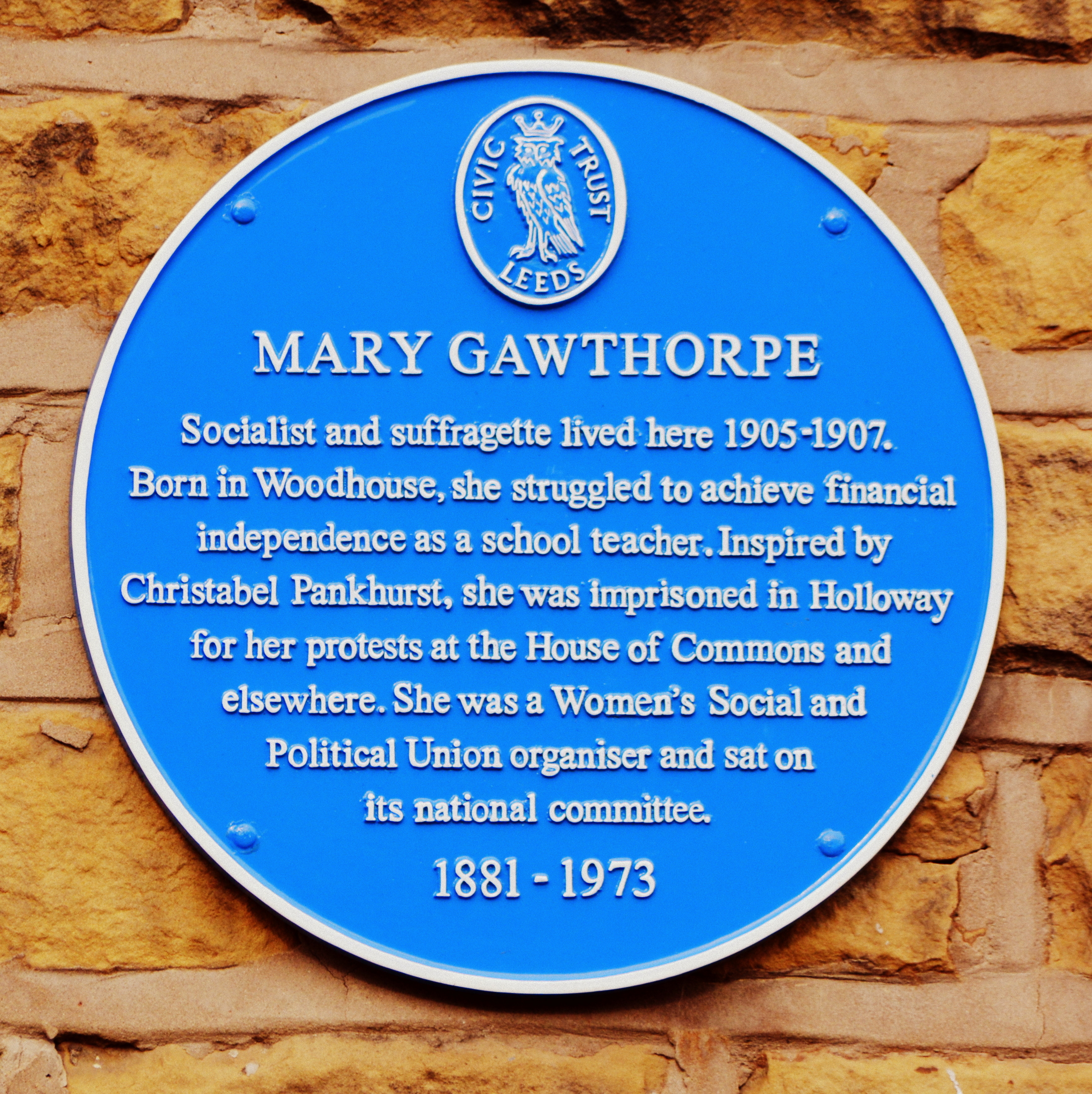
Blue plaque at Warrel's Mount, Bramley.

- Geoffrey Appleyard, Commando and SAS war hero, was born in Bramley in 1916.
- Mary Gawthorpe, the suffragette, socialist, trade unionist and editor, lived and worked in Bramley as a school teacher.
- Jamie Peacock, English professional rugby league player for the Leeds Rhinos and the Bradford Bulls, who captained Great Britain and England, was born in Bramley in 1977.
- Ernie Wise, of Morecambe and Wise fame, was born in Bramley and brought up in East Ardsley.

== See also ==
- Listed buildings in Leeds (Bramley and Stanningley Ward)
