= Number (music) =

Individual song, dance, or instrumental piece within a larger musical work

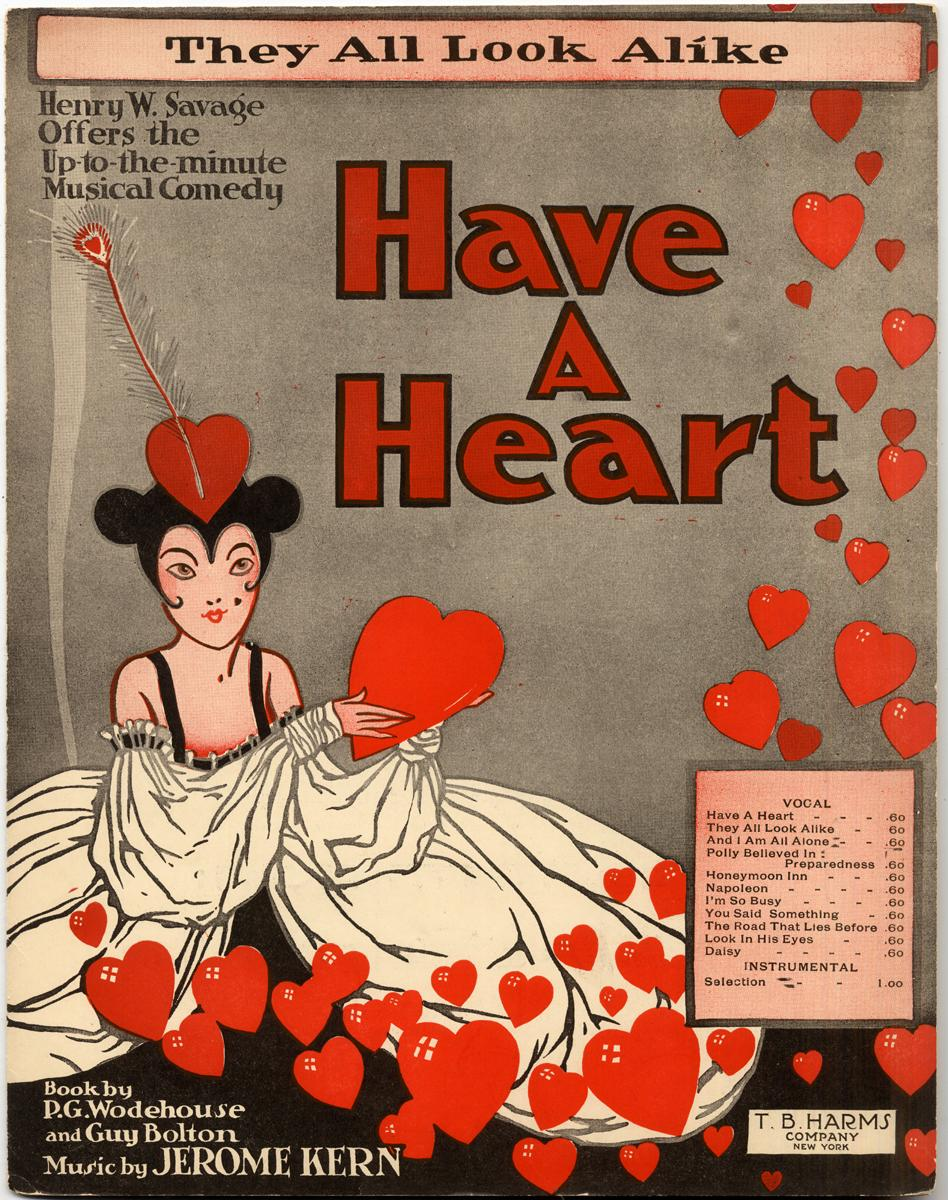
Individual numbers from musicals were often published separately as sheet music as in this example, "They All Look Alike" from Jerome Kern's Have a Heart

In music, number refers to an individual song, dance, or instrumental piece which is part of a larger work of musical theatre, opera, or oratorio. It can also refer either to an individual song in a published collection or an individual song or dance in a performance of several unrelated musical pieces as in concerts and revues. Both meanings of the term have been used in American English since the second half of the 19th century.

== Musical theatre and related genres ==
In musical theatre, the lyrics of the individual song numbers are integrated with the narrative of the libretto (or "book"). As early as 1917, Jerome Kern wrote that "musical numbers should carry on the action of the play, and should be representative of the personalities of the characters who sing them." The lyricist Oscar Hammerstein, another proponent of this view, even refused to list the numbers in Rose-Marie because he thought it would detract from what he viewed as the close integration between the book and the lyrics. However, both David Horn and Scott McMillin have proposed that full integration is not completely possible. For McMillin, the start of a musical number creates a noticeably different "feel" in which the singer becomes a "performer" not simply a character. For Horn, the individual numbers can serve not only to advance the narrative but also to directly address and engage the audience in an experience which stands apart from the dramatic context of the work, and this latter function had its roots in vaudeville entertainments. In revues, a type of multi-act popular theatrical entertainment that combines music, dance and sketches, there is no overall narrative, but rather a sequence of unrelated (often lavish) musical numbers. However, as Rick Altman points out, some of the numbers in these types of shows such "This Heart of Mine" in the film Ziegfeld Follies can be narratives in miniature. That number, according to Altman, "is not just musical—its dream-like dance grows out of the Bremer/Astaire mimed narrative which opens the selection."

== Opera and oratorio ==
Opera numbers may be arias, but also ensemble pieces, such as duets, trios, quartets, quintets, sextets or choruses. They may also be ballets and instrumental pieces, such as marches, sinfonias, or intermezzi. Until the mid-19th century most operas were structured as a series of discrete numbers connected by recitative or spoken dialogue. Oratorios followed a similar model. However, as the century progressed, numbers were increasingly unified into larger musical segments with no clear break between them. Early examples of this trend include Carl Maria von Weber's opera Euryanthe and Robert Schumann's secular oratorio Das Paradies und die Peri.

== See also ==
- Number opera
- Comédie mêlée d'ariettes
- Show tune
