= Lists of operas =

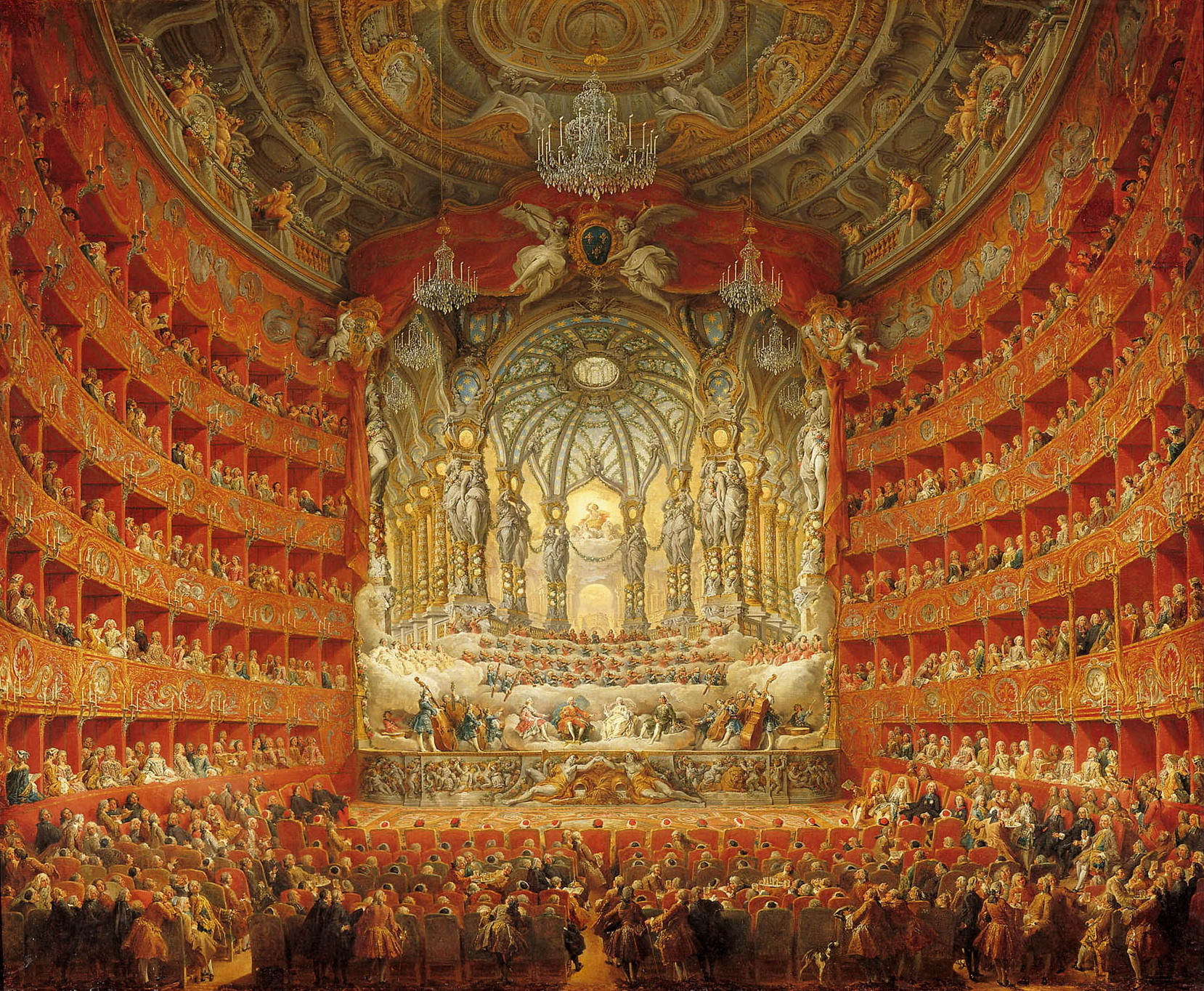
Musical feast given by the cardinal de La Rochefoucauld in the Teatro Argentina in Rome in 1747

Lists of operas cover operas, a form of theatre in which music is essential, and the roles are portrayed by singers. There are general lists and lists by theme, country, medium and venue.

== General ==
- List of operas by composer
- List of prominent operas
- List of operas by title

== By theme ==
- List of operettas
- List of Christmas operas
- List of operas set in the Crusades
- List of Orphean operas
- Science fiction opera

== By country ==
- List of Argentine operas
- List of Mexican operas
- List of North Korean operas

== By medium ==
- List of radio operas
- List of television operas

== By venue ==
- Glyndebourne Festival Opera: history and repertoire, 1934–51
- Glyndebourne Festival Opera: history and repertoire, 1952–63
- List of Innsbruck Festival of Early Music productions
- List of performances of French grand operas at the Paris Opéra
- Salzburg Festival: history and repertoire, 1922–1926
- Salzburg Festival: history and repertoire, 1935–1937
- List of operas performed at the Santa Fe Opera
- List of works premiered at the Teatro Capranica
- Repertory of the Vienna Court Opera under Gustav Mahler
- List of operas performed at the Wexford Festival
