= Number opera =

A number opera (Italian: opera a numeri; German: Nummeroper; French: opéra à numéros) is an opera consisting of individual pieces of music ('numbers') which can be easily extracted from the larger work. They may be numbered consecutively in the score, and may be interspersed with recitative or spoken dialogue. Opera numbers may be arias, but also ensemble pieces, such as duets, trios, quartets, quintets, sextets or choruses. They may also be ballets and instrumental pieces, such as marches, sinfonias, or intermezzi. The number opera format was standard until the mid-19th century and most opera genres, including opera seria, opera buffa, opéra comique, ballad opera, Singspiel, and grand opera, were constructed in this fashion.

The replacement of numbers with more continuous music began in operas by Jommelli, Traetta, Gluck, and especially Mozart, whose late operas Le Nozze di Figaro and Don Giovanni contain several segments in which different numbers are unified by bridge passages to form a musical whole. This trend became even more striking in the operas of the German composers Beethoven, Weber, and Meyerbeer, while their Italian and French contemporaries Rossini, Donizetti, Bellini, and Auber retained the number opera style.

The number opera was strongly condemned by Wagner for dramatic reasons, and he replaced it with continuous music that advances the drama without interruption. The number opera became unfashionable, and the late operas of Verdi and those of Puccini and the Verismo school, cannot be described as such.

Many operatic composers subsequent to Wagner adopted his approach. However, in the 20th century some composers intentionally revived or adapted the number opera format, e. g., Busoni's Arlecchino (1917), Berg's Wozzeck (1925), Hindemith's Cardillac (1926, rev. 1952), and Stravinsky's The Rake's Progress (1951). In operetta and in popular music theatre, number opera format has remained the norm.
