= Performance history of The Tempest =

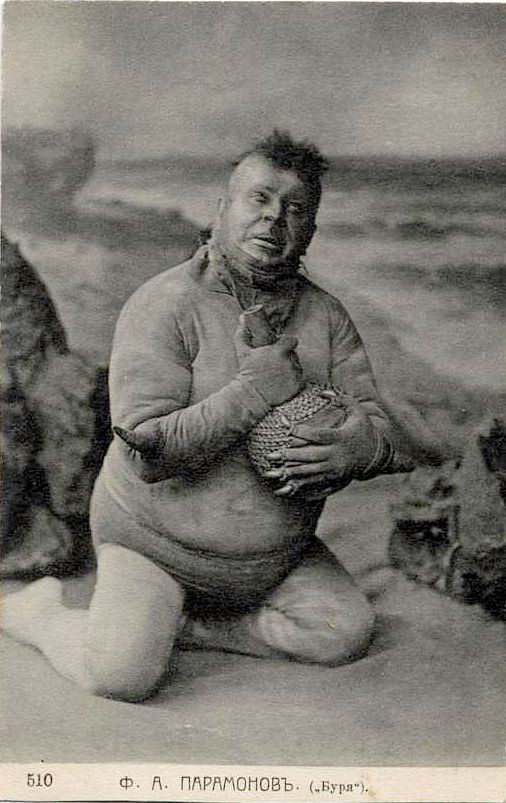
Fyodor Paramonov as Caliban, Maly Theatre (Moscow), 1905

William Shakespeare's play The Tempest has been performed in various forms and adaptations in the 400 years since it was originally written.

== Shakespeare's day ==
A record exists of a performance of The Tempest on 1 November 1611 by the King's Men before King James and the English royal court at Whitehall Palace on Hallowmas night. The play was one of the six Shakespeare plays (and eight others for a total of 14) acted at court during the winter of 1612–13 as part of the festivities surrounding the marriage of Princess Elizabeth with Frederick V, the Elector of the Palatinate of the Rhine. There is no further public performance recorded prior to the Restoration; but in his 1669 preface to the Dryden/Davenant version, John Dryden states that The Tempest had been performed at the Blackfriars Theatre. Careful consideration of stage directions within the play supports this, strongly suggesting that the play was written with Blackfriars Theatre rather than the Globe Theatre in mind. But the mid-20th century critic Frank Kermode, while agreeing that The Tempest is a Blackfriars play, argued that it could easily have been accommodated at The Globe also, as others of Shakespeare's late romances were.

== Restoration and 18th century ==
Adaptations of the play, not Shakespeare's original, dominated the performance history of The Tempest from the English Restoration until the mid-19th century. All theatres were closed down by the puritan government during the English Interregnum. Upon the restoration of the monarchy in 1660, two patent companies—the King's Company and the Duke's Company—were established, and the existing theatrical repertoire divided between them. Sir William Davenant's Duke's Company had the rights to perform The Tempest. In 1667 Davenant and John Dryden made heavy cuts and adapted it as The Tempest, or The Enchanted Island. They tried to appeal to upper-class audiences by emphasising royalist political and social ideals: monarchy is the natural form of government; patriarchal authority decisive in education and marriage; and patrilineality preeminent in inheritance and ownership of property. They also added characters and plotlines: Miranda has a sister, named Dorinda; Caliban also has a sister, named Sycorax. As a parallel to Shakespeare's Miranda/Ferdinand plot, Prospero has a foster-son, Hippolito, who has never set eyes on a woman. Hippolito was a popular breeches role, a man played by a woman, popular with Restoration theatre management for the opportunity to reveal actresses' legs. Scholar Michael Dobson has described The Tempest, or The Enchanted Island by Dryden and Davenant as "the most frequently revived play of the entire Restoration" and as establishing the importance of enhanced and additional roles for women.

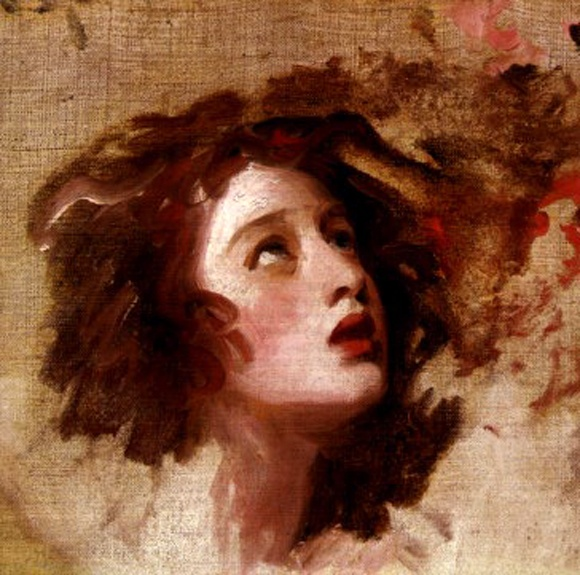
Oil sketch of Emma Hart, as Miranda, by George Romney

In 1674, Thomas Shadwell re-adapted Dryden and Davenant as an opera of the same name, usually meaning a play with sections that were to be sung or danced. Restoration playgoers appear to have regarded the Dryden/Davenant/Shadwell version as Shakespeare's: Samuel Pepys, for example, described it as "an old play of Shakespeares" in his diary. The opera was extremely popular, and "full of so good variety, that I cannot be more pleased almost in a comedy" according to Pepys. Prospero in this version is very different from Shakespeare's: Eckhard Auberlen describes him as "reduced to the status of a Polonius-like overbusy father, intent on protecting the chastity of his two sexually naive daughters while planning advantageous dynastic marriages for them". The operatic Enchanted Island was successful enough to provoke a parody, The Mock Tempest, or The Enchanted Castle, written by Thomas Duffett for the King's Company in 1675. It opened with what appeared to be a tempest, but turned out to be a riot in a brothel.

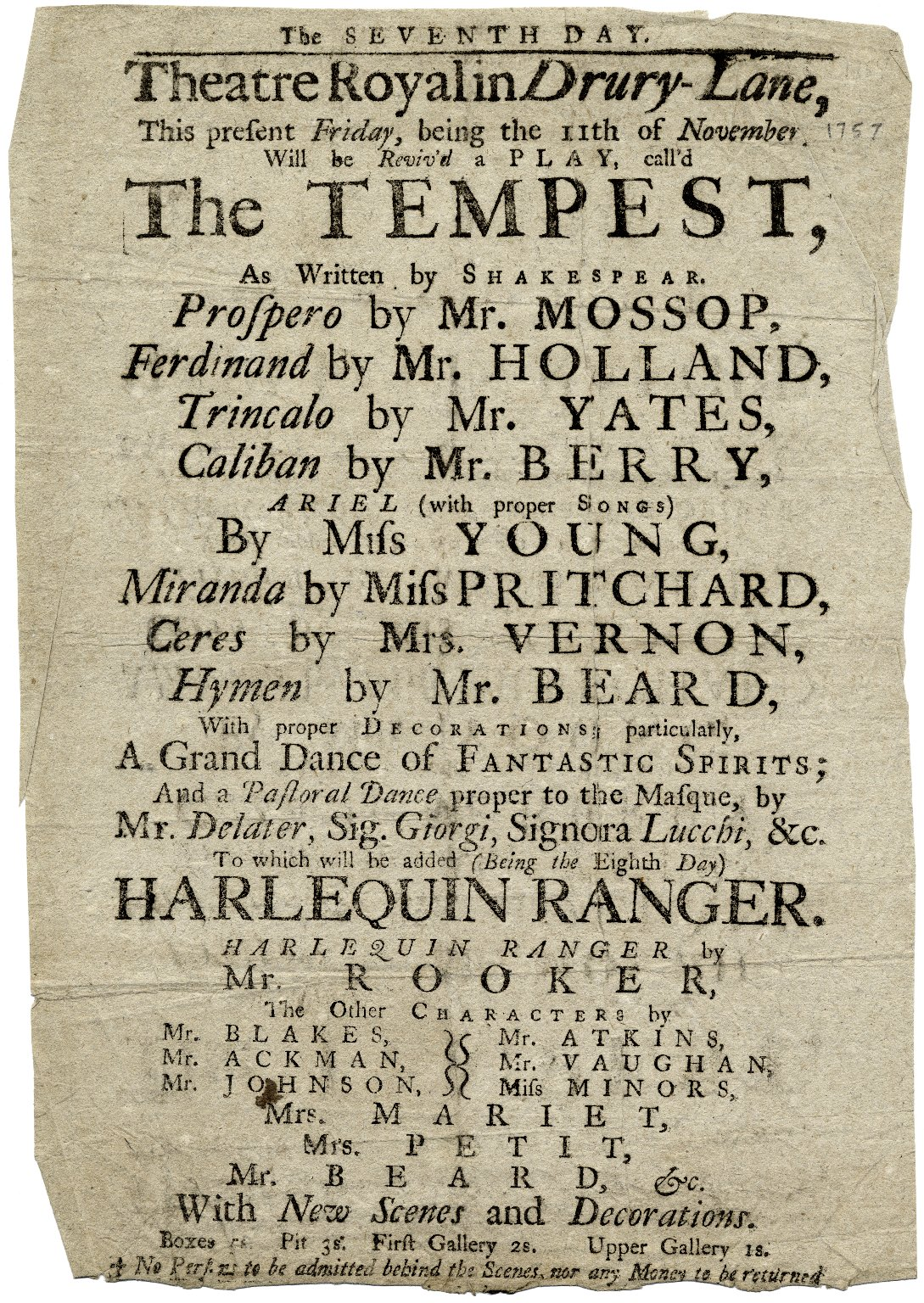
A playbill for a 1757 production of The Tempest at the Drury Lane Theatre Royal

In the early 18th century, the Dryden/Davenant/Shadwell version dominated the stage. Ariel was—with two exceptions—played by a woman, and invariably by a graceful dancer and superb singer. Caliban was a comedian's role, played by actors "known for their awkward figures". In 1756, David Garrick staged another operatic version, a "three-act extravaganza" with music by John Christopher Smith.

The Tempest was one of the staples of the repertoire of Romantic Era theatres. John Philip Kemble produced an acting version which was closer to Shakespeare's original, but nevertheless retained Dorinda and Hippolito. Kemble was much-mocked for his insistence on archaic pronunciation of Shakespeare's texts, including "aitches" for "aches". It was said that spectators "packed the pit, just to enjoy hissing Kemble's delivery of 'I'll rack thee with old cramps, / Fill all they bones with aches'." The actor-managers of the Romantic Era established the fashion for opulence in sets and costumes which would dominate Shakespeare performances until the late 19th century: Kemble's Dorinda and Miranda, for example, were played "in white ornamented with spotted furs".

In 1757, a year after the debut of his operatic version, David Garrick produced a heavily cut performance of Shakespeare's script at Drury Lane, and it was revived, profitably, throughout the century.

== 19th century ==
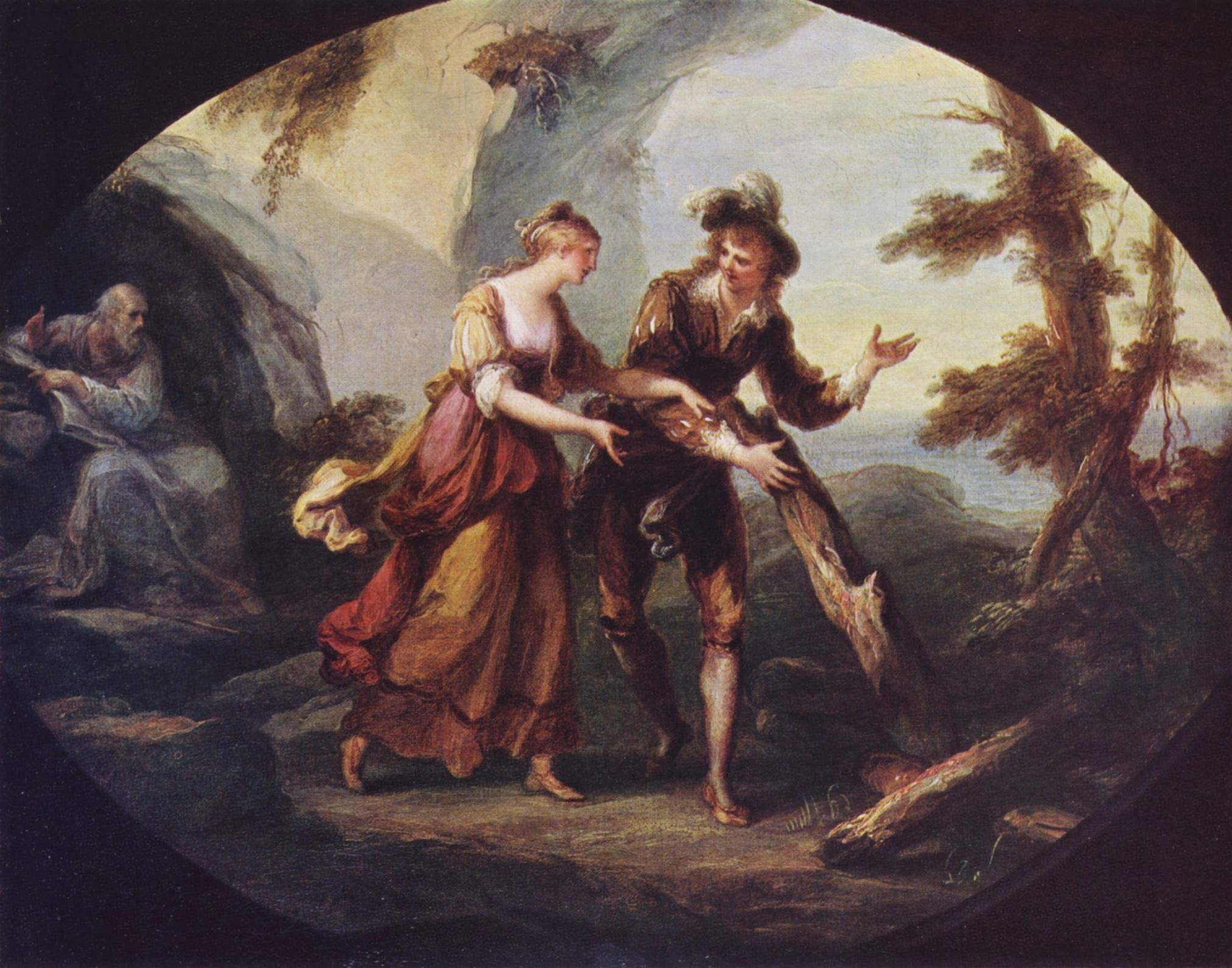
Miranda and Ferdinand by Angelica Kauffman, 1782

It was not until William Charles Macready's influential production in 1838 that Shakespeare's text established its primacy over the adapted and operatic versions which had been popular for most of the previous two centuries. The performance was particularly admired for George Bennett's performance as Caliban; it was described by Patrick MacDonnell—in his "An Essay on the Play of The Tempest" published in 1840—as "maintaining in his mind, a strong resistance to that tyranny, which held him in the thraldom of slavery".

The Victorian era marked the height of the movement which would later be described as "pictorial": based on lavish sets and visual spectacle, heavily cut texts making room for lengthy scene-changes, and elaborate stage effects. In Charles Kean's 1857 production of The Tempest, Ariel was several times seen to descend in a ball of fire. The hundred and forty stagehands supposedly employed on this production were described by The Literary Gazette as "unseen ... but alas never unheard". Hans Christian Andersen also saw this production and described Ariel as "isolated by the electric ray", referring to the effect of a carbon arc lamp directed at the actress playing the role.

In these Victorian productions it was widely accepted that the spectacle of the opening sea-storm was the highlight of the show, with the custom developing of dropping Shakespeare's lines from the opening scene altogether. The next generation of producers, which included William Poel and Harley Granville-Barker, returned to a leaner and more text-based style.

In the late 19th and early 20th centuries, Caliban, not Prospero, was perceived as the star act of The Tempest, and was the role which the actor-managers chose for themselves. Frank Benson researched the role by viewing monkeys and baboons at the zoo. On stage, described by one reviewer as "half-monkey, half-coconut", he hung upside-down from a tree and gibbered.

== 20th century ==
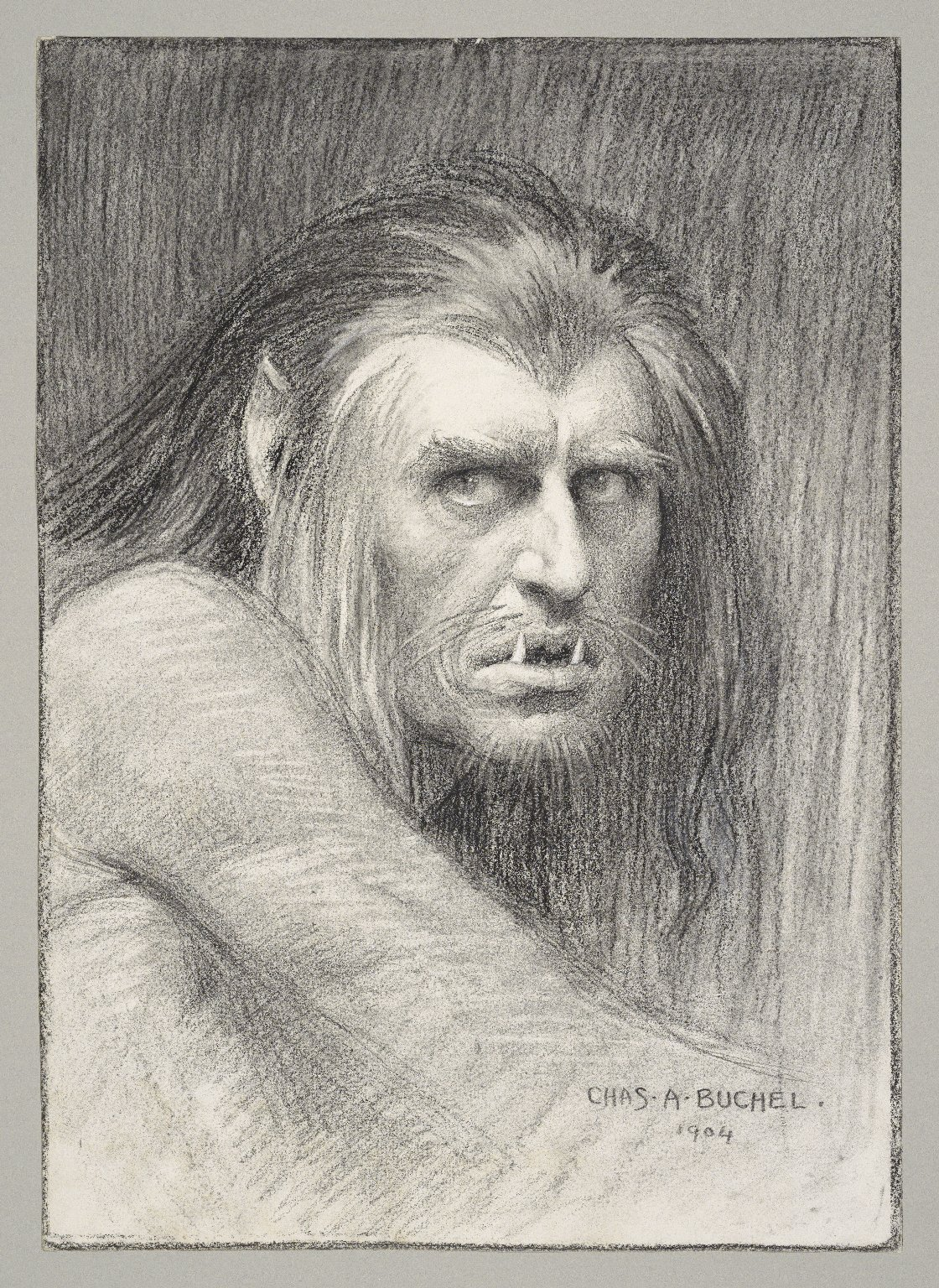
A charcoal drawing by Charles Buchel of Herbert Beerbohm Tree as Caliban in the 1904 production.

Continuing the late-19th-century tradition, in 1904 Herbert Beerbohm Tree wore fur and seaweed to play Caliban, with waist-length hair and apelike bearing, suggestive of a primitive part-animal part-human stage of evolution. This "missing link" portrayal of Caliban became the norm in productions until Roger Livesey, in 1934, was the first actor to play the role with black makeup. In 1945 Canada Lee played the role at the Theatre Guild in New York, establishing a tradition of black actors taking the role, including Earle Hyman in 1960 and James Earl Jones in 1962.

In 1916, Percy MacKaye presented a community masque, Caliban by the Yellow Sands, at the Lewisohn Stadium in New York. Amidst a huge cast of dancers and masquers, the pageant centres on the rebellious nature of Caliban but ends with his plea for more knowledge ("I yearn to build, to be thine Artist / And 'stablish this thine Earth among the stars- / Beautiful!") followed by Shakespeare, as a character, reciting Prospero's "Our revels now are ended" speech.

John Gielgud played Prospero numerous times, and is, according to Douglas Brode, "universally heralded as ... [the 20th] century's greatest stage Prospero". His first appearance in the role was in 1930: he wore a turban, later confessing that he intended to look like Dante. He played the role in three more stage productions, lastly at the Royal National Theatre in 1974. Scholar Martin Butler has described his Propspero as "a vigorous, forceful and intellectually alert individual, he always dominated the play, but was not easily likeable."

Peter Brook directed an experimental production at the Round House in 1968, in which the text was "almost wholly abandoned" in favour of mime. According to Margaret Croydon's review, Sycorax was "portrayed by an enormous woman able to expand her face and body to still larger proportions—a fantastic emblem of the grotesque ... [who] suddenly ... gives a horrendous yell, and Caliban, with black sweater over his head, emerges from between her legs: Evil is born."

In spite of the existing tradition of a black actor playing Caliban opposite a white Prospero, colonial interpretations of the play did not find their way onto the stage until the 1970s. Performances in England directed by Jonathan Miller and by Clifford Williams explicitly portrayed Prospero as coloniser. Miller's production was described, by David Hirst, as depicting "the tragic and inevitable disintegration of a more primitive culture as the result of European invasion and colonisation". Miller developed this approach in his 1988 production at the Old Vic in London, starring Max von Sydow as Prospero. This used a mixed cast made up of white actors as the humans and black actors playing the spirits and creatures of the island. According to Michael Billington, "von Sydow's Prospero became a white overlord manipulating a mutinous black Caliban and a collaborative Ariel keenly mimicking the gestures of the island's invaders. The colonial metaphor was pushed through to its logical conclusion so that finally Ariel gathered up the pieces of Prospero's abandoned staff and, watched by awe-struck tribesmen, fitted them back together to hold his wand of office aloft before an immobilised Caliban. The Tempest suddenly acquired a new political dimension unforeseen by Shakespeare." Une Tempête is a 1969 play by Aimé Césaire. It is an adaptation of Shakespeare's The Tempest from a postcolonial perspective, set on an island in the Caribbean. The play was first performed at the Festival d'Hammamet in Tunisia under the direction of Jean-Marie Serreau. It later played in Avignon and Paris. Césaire uses all of the characters from Shakespeare's version, with some additions and new renderings of the original cast. In this version, Césaire specifies that Prospero is a white master, while Ariel is a mulatto and Caliban is a black slave. These characters are the focus of the play as Césaire emphasized issues of race, power, decolonization, and anti-imperialism.

Psychoanalytic interpretations have proved more difficult to depict on stage. Gerald Freedman's production at the American Shakespeare Theatre in 1979 and Ron Daniels' Royal Shakespeare Company production in 1982 both attempted to depict Ariel and Caliban as opposing aspects of Prospero's psyche. However neither was regarded as wholly successful: Shakespeare Quarterly, reviewing Freedman's production, commented, "Mr. Freedman did nothing on stage to make such a notion clear to any audience that had not heard of it before."

Italian director Giorgio Strehler directed a Brecht-inspired version of the Tempest from 1978 which proved influential in containing the much-copied image of Prospero at the centre of the play's opening storm scene, orchestrating the visual effects around him.

In 1988, John Wood played Prospero for the RSC, emphasising the character's human complexity, in a performance a reviewer described as "a demented stage manager on a theatrical island suspended between smouldering rage at his usurpation and unbridled glee at his alternative ethereal power".

Japanese theatre styles have been applied to The Tempest. In 1988 and again in 1992 Yukio Ninagawa brought his version of The Tempest to the UK. It was staged as a rehearsal of a Noh drama, with a traditional Noh theatre at the back of the stage, but also using elements which were at odds with Noh conventions. In 1992, Minoru Fujita presented a Bunraku (Japanese puppet) version in Osaka and at the Tokyo Globe.

Sam Mendes directed a 1993 RSC production in which Simon Russell Beale's Ariel was openly resentful of the control exercised by Alec McCowen's Prospero. Controversially, in the early performances of the run, Ariel spat at Prospero, once granted his freedom. An entirely different effect was achieved by George C. Wolfe in the outdoor New York Shakespeare Festival production of 1995, where the casting of Aunjanue Ellis as Ariel opposite Patrick Stewart's Prospero charged the production with erotic tensions. Productions in the late 20th-century have gradually increased the focus placed on sexual tensions between the characters, including Prospero/Miranda, Prospero/Ariel, Miranda/Caliban, Miranda/Ferdinand and Caliban/Trinculo.

== 21st Century ==
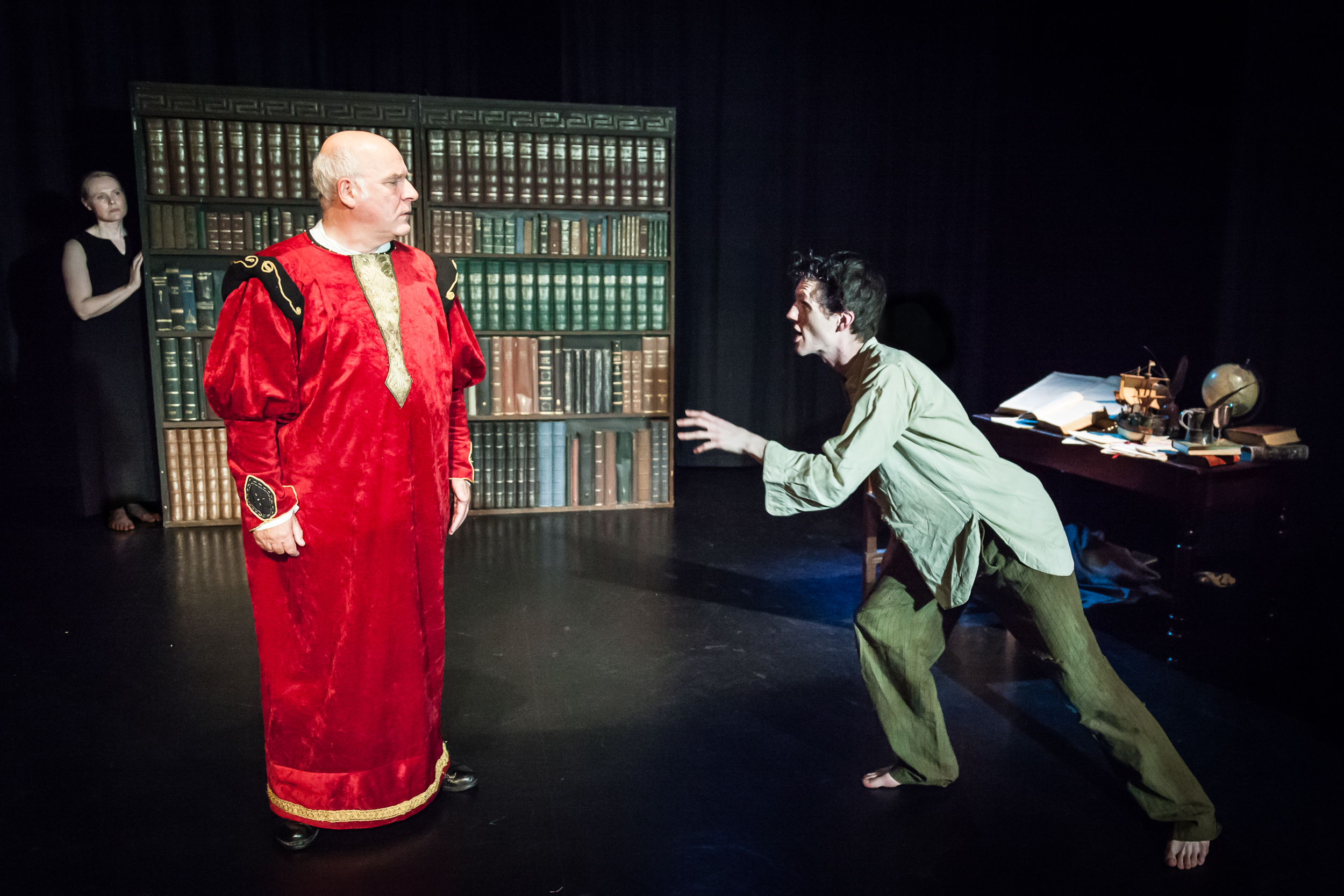
Caliban rants at Prospero while Ariel looks on, in a 2014 production by OVO theatre company, St Albans, UK

The Tempest was performed at the Globe Theatre in 2000 with Vanessa Redgrave as Prospero, playing the role as neither male nor female, but with "authority, humanity and humour ... a watchful parent to both Miranda and Ariel". While the audience respected Prospero, Jasper Britton's Caliban "was their man" (in Peter Thomson's words), in spite of the fact that he spat fish at the groundlings, and singled some of them out for humiliating encounters. Derek Jacobi's Prospero for The Old Vic in 2003 was praised for his portrayal of isolation and pain in ageing. By the end of 2005, BBC Radio had aired 21 productions of The Tempest, more than any other play by Shakespeare.

In 2016 The Tempest was produced by the Royal Shakespeare Company. Directed by Gregory Doran, and featuring Simon Russell Beale as Prospero, the RSC's version used motion capture to project Ariel in real time as a "pixelated humanoid sprite" on stage. The performance was in collaboration with The Imaginarium and Intel, and featured (in the words of the London Standard's review) "some ... gorgeous, some interesting, and some gimmicky and distracting" use of light, special effects, and set design.

In 2019, Mohegan writer Madeline Sayet's solo show Where We Belong at Shakespeare's Globe engaged in a postcolonial speculation about the European characters' abandonment of the island at the play's end: wondering whether Caliban's native language would return to him.

== Citations ==
=== References ===
References to The Tempest are to the Arden Third Series Edition (i.e. Vaughan and Vaughan 1999). Under its numbering system 4.1.148 means act 4, scene 1, line 148; and 5.E.20 means the epilogue following act 5, line 20.

=== Bibliography ===
- Auberlen, Eckhard (1991). "The Tempest and the Concerns of the Restoration Court: A Study of The Enchanted Island and the Operatic Tempest". Restoration: Studies in English Literary Culture, 1660–1700. 15: 71–88. ISSN 1941-952X.
- Billington, Michael (1 January 1989). "In Britain, a Proliferation of Prosperos". The New York Times.
- Brode, Douglas (2001). Shakespeare in the Movies: From the Silent Era to Today. New York: Berkley Boulevard Books. ISBN 0-425-18176-6. OCLC 46822465.
- Butler, Martin (2007). The Tempest. The Penguin Shakespeare. Penguin Books Limited. ISBN 978-0-141-01664-1.
- Chambers, Edmund Kerchever (1930). William Shakespeare: A Study of Facts and Problems. Vol. 2. Oxford: Clarendon Press. OCLC 24717895.
- Coveney, Michael (11 August 2011). "Obituary: John Wood: Ferociously Intelligent Actor Who Reigned Supreme in Stoppard and Shakespeare". The Guardian. p. 34.
- Croyden, Margaret (1969). "Peter Brook's Tempest". The Drama Review. 13 (3): 125–128. doi:10.2307/1144467. JSTOR 1144467.
- Dawson, Anthony B (2002). "International Shakespeare". In Wells, Stanley; Stanton, Sarah (eds.). The Cambridge Companion to Shakespeare on Stage. Cambridge University Press. pp. 174–193. ISBN 0-521-79711-X. OCLC 48140822.
- Dobson, Michael (1992). The Making of the National Poet: Shakespeare, Adaptation and Authorship, 1660–1769. Oxford: Oxford University Press. ISBN 978-0-19-818323-5. OCLC 25631612.
- Dymkowski, Christine (2000). The Tempest. Cambridge: Cambridge University Press. ISBN 978-0-521-78375-0. OCLC 42692159.
- Gay, Penny (2002). "Women and Shakespearean Performance". In Wells, Stanley; Stanton, Sarah (eds.). The Cambridge Companion to Shakespeare on Stage. Cambridge University Press. pp. 155–173. ISBN 0-521-79711-X. OCLC 48140822.
- Greenhalgh, Susanne. "Shakespeare Overheard: Performances, Adaptations, and Citations on Radio". In Shaughnessy (2007), pp. 175–198.
- Gurr, Andrew (1989). "The Tempest's Tempest at Blackfriars". In Wells, Stanley (ed.). The Tempest's Tempest at Blackfriars. Shakespeare Survey. Vol. 41. Cambridge University Press. pp. 91–102. doi:10.1017/CCOL0521360714.009. ISBN 0-521-36071-4. OCLC 496993116.
- Halliday, F.E. (1964). A Shakespeare Companion, 1564–1964. Baltimore: Penguin. ISBN 0-7156-0309-4. OCLC 1508226102.
- Hirst, David L. (1984). The Tempest: Text and Performance. Basingstoke, Hampshire: Macmillan. ISBN 978-0-333-34465-1. OCLC 13582384.
- Hitchings, Henry (18 November 2016). "The Tempest: Theatre's Traditional Virtues Endure in Tech-Heavy Show". Evening Standard. London. Archived from the original on 6 May 2017.
- Kermode, Frank, ed. (1954). The Tempest. The Arden Shakespeare, second series (6th ed.). Methuen. OCLC 876474007. OL 6244436M.
- Marsden, Jean I. "Improving Shakespeare: From the Restoration to Garrick". In Wells & Stanton (2002), pp. 21–36.
- Moody, Jane. "Romantic Shakespeare". In Wells & Stanton (2002), pp. 37–57.
- Saccio, Peter (1980). "American Shakespeare Theatre, Stratford, Connecticut". Shakespeare Quarterly. 31 (2). Johns Hopkins University Press: 187–191. doi:10.2307/2869526. ISSN 0037-3222. JSTOR 2869526.
- Schoch, Richard W. "Pictorial Shakespeare". In Wells & Stanton (2002), pp. 58–75.
- Shaughnessy, Robert, ed. (2007). The Cambridge Companion to Shakespeare and Popular Culture. Cambridge: Cambridge University Press. ISBN 978-0-521-60580-9. OCLC 1229716002.
- Spencer, Charles (23 January 2003). "A Most Magical Prospero". The Telegraph.
- Thomson, Peter. "The Comic Actor and Shakespeare". In Wells & Stanton (2002), pp. 137–154.
- Vaughan, Virginia Mason; Vaughan, Alden T. (1999). The Tempest. The Arden Shakespeare, Third Series. The Arden Shakespeare. ISBN 978-1-903436-08-0. OCLC 1424207290.
- Vaughan, Virginia Mason; Vaughan, Alden T. (2011). The Tempest: Revised Edition. The Arden Shakespeare, Third Series. The Arden Shakespeare. ISBN 978-1-4081-3347-7. OCLC 761369508.
- Wells, Stanley; Stanton, Sarah, eds. (2002). The Cambridge Companion to Shakespeare on Stage. Cambridge: Cambridge University Press. ISBN 0-521-79711-X. OCLC 1327891559.
- Wells, Stanley; Orlin, Lena Cowen, eds. (2003). Shakespeare: An Oxford Guide. Oxford: Oxford University Press. ISBN 0-19-924522-3. OCLC 50920674.
- Working, Lauren; Loughnane, Rory (2024). The Tempest. The New Oxford Shakespeare. Oxford University Press. ISBN 978-0-19-286587-8. OCLC 1445769740.
