= George Hudson (disambiguation) =

George Hudson (1800–1871) was an English railway financier.

George Hudson may also refer to:

- George Hudson (footballer) (1937–2020), player for Coventry City F.C.
- George Hudson (Canadian football) (born 1976), Canadian professional Canadian football player
- George LeRoy Hudson (1883–1952), Canadian politician
- George Hudson (entomologist) (1867–1946), New Zealand entomologist and astronomer
- George Hudson (MP) (1845–1912), British Member of Parliament for Hitchin, 1892–1906
- George Hudson (cricketer) (1905–1981), English cricketer
- George R. Hudson (1919–2012), American politician
- George Hudson (composer), English violinist, lutenist, singer, and composer of Baroque music
