= Annus Mirabilis (poem) =

Poem by John Dryden

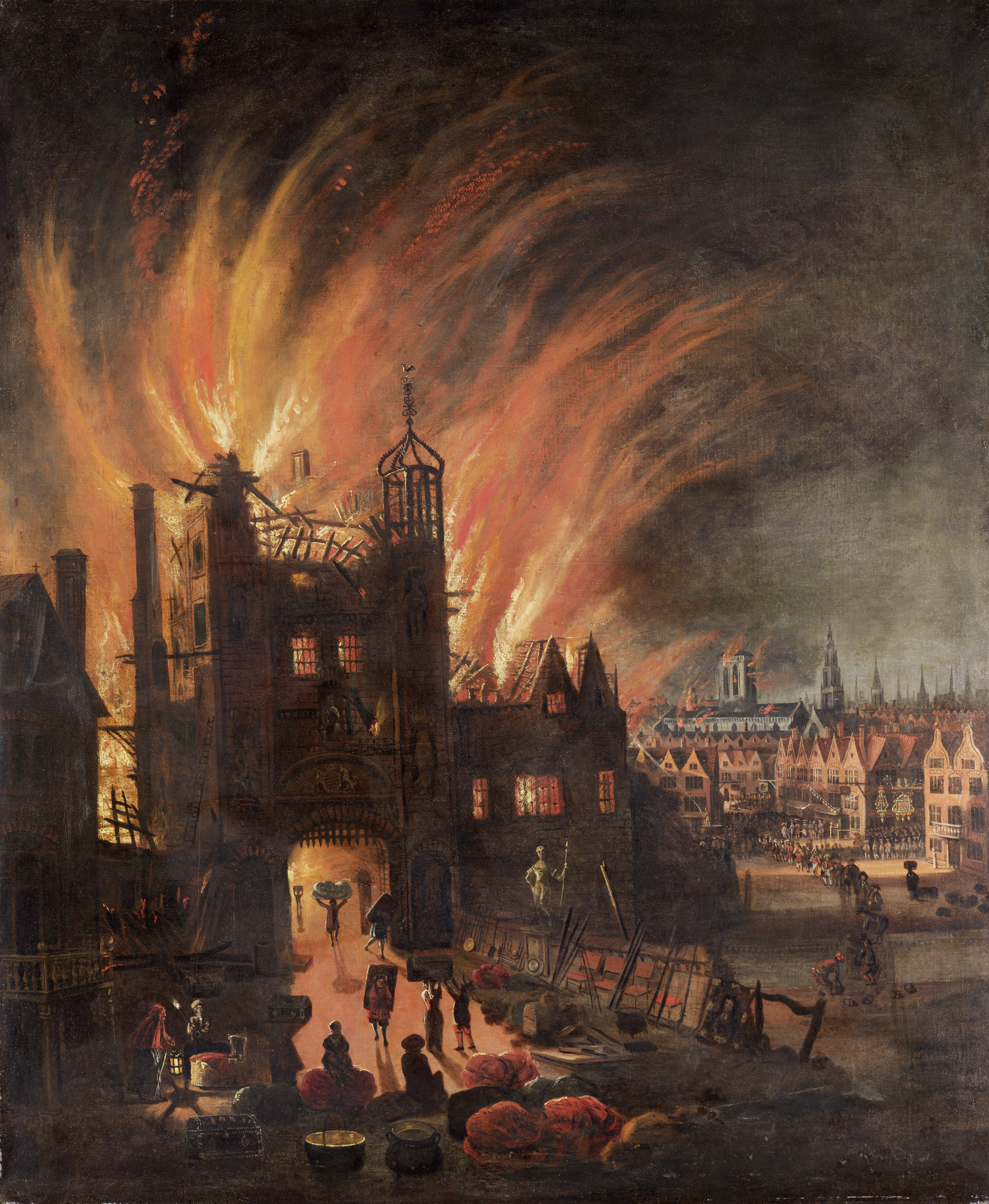
The Great Fire of London, which took place on September 2, 1666, was one of the major events that affected England during Dryden's "year of miracles".

Annus Mirabilis is a poem written by John Dryden published in 1667. It commemorated 1665–1666, the "year of miracles" of London. Despite the poem's name, the year had been one of great tragedy, including the Great Fire of London. The title was perhaps meant to suggest that the events of the year could have been worse. Dryden wrote the poem while at Charlton in Wiltshire, where he went to escape one of the great events of the year: the Great Plague of London.

== Historical context ==
The title of Dryden's poem, used without capitalisation, annus mirabilis, derives its meaning from its Latin origins and describes a year of particularly notable events. According to the Oxford English Dictionary, Dryden's use of the term for the title of his poem constitutes the first known written use of the phrase in an English text. The first event of the miraculous year was the Battle of Lowestoft fought by English and Dutch ships in 1665. The second was the Four Days Battle of June 1666, and finally the victory of the St. James's Day Battle a month later. The second part of the poem deals with the Great Fire of London that ran from September 2–7, 1666. The miracle of the Fire was that London was saved, that the fire was stopped, and that the great king (Charles II) would rebuild, for he already announced his plans to improve the streets of London and to begin great projects. Dryden's view is that these disasters were all averted, that God had saved England from destruction, and that God had performed miracles for England.

== Structure ==
The poem contains 1216 lines of verse, arranged in 304 quatrains. Each line consists of ten syllables, and each quatrain follows an abab rhyme scheme, a pattern referred to as a decasyllabic quatrain. Rather than write in the heroic couplets found in his earlier works, Dryden used the decasyllabic quatrain exemplified in Sir John Davies' poem Nosce Teipsum in 1599. The style was revived by William Davenant in his poem Gondibert, which was published in 1651 and influenced Dryden's composition of Annus Mirabilis. This particular style dictates that each quatrain should contain a full stop, which A. W. Ward believes causes the verse to become "prosy".
