= Thomas Duffet =

Irish playwright and songwriter

- Occupation: Playwright

Thomas Duffet (fl. 1673 – 1676), or Duffett, was an Irish playwright and songwriter active in England in the 1670s. He is remembered for his popular songs and his burlesques of the serious plays of John Dryden, Thomas Shadwell, Elkanah Settle and Sir William Davenant.

By profession, Duffet was a milliner who maintained a shop in the New Exchange in London. Virtually nothing is known of his life apart from his surviving works. A Thomas Duffet confessed to forgery in 1677 and this may have been the author. Duffet's plays show a close familiarity with the lower and criminal classes of London society, perhaps suggesting first-hand knowledge.

== Plays ==
Duffet's dramatic canon is uncertain and in dispute among scholars and critics. Six plays are generally attributed to him with a fair degree of certainty:

- The Spanish Rogue, 1673 (printed 1674)
- The Amorous Old Woman, 1674
- The Mock Tempest, or the Enchanted Castle, 1674 (1675)
- The Empress of Morocco: a Farce, 1674
- Psyche Debauch'd, 1675 (1678)
- Beauty's Triumph, 1676.

(The plays were first printed in the years they were staged, except where noted.)

Duffet started as a conventional dramatist. His earliest two works were comedies. The market steered him in a different direction. The Spanish Rogue has been called "the best of all this author's dramatic works, yet it met with very indifferent success". Upon publication, the play was dedicated to Nell Gwyn.

Duffet had much greater success in mocking other men's plays. Burlesque was a new development in English theatre in Duffet's generation. Sir William Davenant's The Playhouse to Be Let (1663; printed 1673) has been called the first burlesque in English drama. Duffett was the one author who took the greatest advantage of this new development in theatrical fashion, prior to Henry Fielding and other writers of the following century.

Like other practitioners of farce and burlesque, Duffet often responded quickly to developments in contemporary society. The Tempest, or the Enchanted Island, Dryden and Davenant's 1667 adaptation of Shakespeare's The Tempest, was first staged in Thomas Shadwell's "opera" version in 1674 and his parody of it was on the stage before the end of the year. Duffet also parodied Settle's The Empress of Morocco (1673) and Shadwell's opera Psyche (1675).

As a dramatist, Duffet worked primarily for the King's Company; the plays he parodied were works staged by the rival Duke's Company. The King's Company was in major difficulty in the years after its grand venue, the Theatre Royal, Drury Lane, burned down in 1672. Duffet's burlesques show the King's Company's determination to compete with its rivals despite this immediate disadvantage.

Subsequent generations of critics, who took their drama very seriously, did not look kindly upon Duffet's effusions. "As pearls before swine, so were Shakspere's plays in the eyes of the hog Duffet" is one of many hostile comments in the relevant literature. Much of this reaction is a response to the abundant sexual humor in Duffet's work, though modern critics with a greater tolerance for such material have taken a less harsh view of Duffet.

In contrast to most of Duffet's drama, Beauty's Triumph was a masque, staged, as its title page attests, "by the Scholars of Mr. Jeffrey Banister and Mr. James Hart, at their new Boarding School for Young Ladies and Gentlewomen ... at Chelsea".

== Songs ==
Duffet's songs have been compared to the songs of Henry Purcell and Thomas Arne in style. "Come All You Pale Lovers", "To Francelia", "The Mistake", "Uncertain Love" and "Since Cœlia's My Foe" are considered among his best. Duffet's collection New Poems, Songs, Prologues and Epilogues was published in 1676 by the bookseller Nicholas Wolfe. The title page states that the musical arrangements for the songs were "set by the most eminent musicians about the town".
