= Worshipful Company of Distillers =

Livery company of the City of London

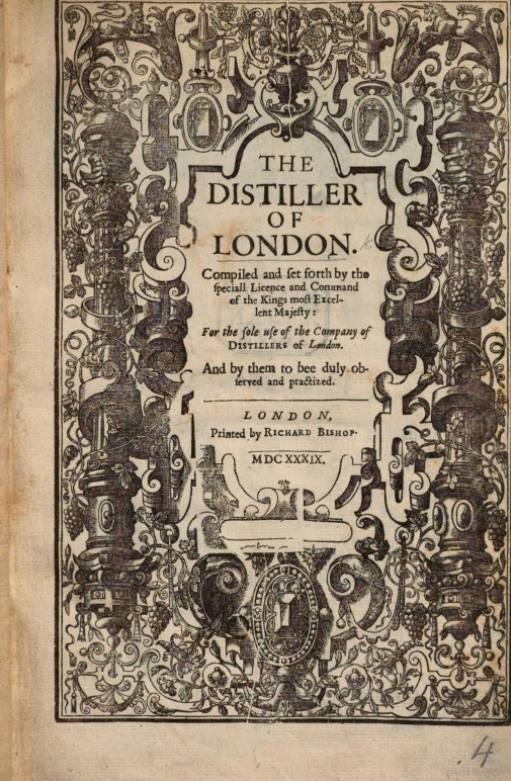
Title page of The Distiller of London (1639), regulating the Company of Distillers, edited by Thomas Cademan and Theodore de Mayerne

The Worshipful Company of Distillers is one of the Livery Companies of the City of London. The Distillers' Company was incorporated under a royal charter in 1638 as proposed by Thomas Cademan and Theodore de Mayerne, physicians to Queen Henrietta Maria. It was empowered to regulate and supervise the production of spirits and liquors. Nowadays, the Company no longer exercises such powers but focuses on charitable distributions, including educational scholarships and bursaries.

== History ==
The Royal Charter of 1638 provided the Company exclusive rights to distill grain within a 21-mile radius of the City of London and the City of Westminster. The Company published The Distiller of London, which set new standards to distill alcohol. The Company supervised the large-scale production of malt distillers, who distributed the low wine to artisan distillers specialized in flavoring the spirit.

When Queen Anne (known for mixing tea with brandy) came to power, she abolished the Company's exclusive rights on distilling grain, creating a sudden blooming industry of small-scale, unregulated distilleries.

The Distillers' Charity, the philanthropic arm of the Company, was established in 1955. It launched the Distillers One of One auctions in 2021.

== Description ==
The Distillers' Company ranks sixty-ninth in the order of precedence of City Livery Companies and its membership, comprising executives from the drinks industry and those whose families were involved in the distilling business, enjoys an active social life.

Its heraldic motto is 'Drop as Rain, Distil as Dew'.

== Masters ==
- 1970-80: George Barrass Potts
