= The Enchanted Isle =

The Enchanted Isle may refer to:

- The Tempest, or The Enchanted Island, a comedy play adapted by John Dryden and William D'Avenant from Shakespeare's comedy The Tempest
- The Enchanted Isle (novel), a 1985 novel by James M. Cain
