= Decasyllabic quatrain =

Poetic form

Decasyllabic quatrain is a poetic form in which each stanza consists of four lines of ten syllables each, usually with a rhyme scheme of AABB or ABAB. Examples of the decasyllabic quatrain in heroic couplets appear in some of the earliest texts in the English language, as Geoffrey Chaucer created the heroic couplet and used it in The Canterbury Tales. The alternating form came to prominence in late 16th-century English poetry and became fashionable in the 17th century when it appeared in heroic poems by William Davenant and John Dryden. In the 18th century famous poets such as Thomas Gray continued to use the form in works such as "Elegy Written in a Country Churchyard". Shakespearean Sonnets, comprising 3 quatrains of iambic pentameter followed by a final couplet, as well as later poems in blank verse have displayed the various uses of the decasyllabic quatrain throughout the history of English Poetry.

== Heroic Quatrain ==
The decasyllabic quatrain with an alternating rhyme scheme is often referred to as the "heroic quatrain", the "heroic stanza" or the "four-line stave". It came to prominence in the poem Nosce Teipsum by Sir John Davies in 1599. Although the use of ten-syllable lines had existed long before Davies's poems, the most common usage for the decasyllabic form was in the heroic couplet, where two lines of iambic pentameter were composed with a rhyme scheme that caused the vowel sound at the end of each line to correspond with the vowel sound of the line immediately following it. Hence, a quatrain formed of heroic couplets would have a scheme of AABB. However, Nosce teipsum used a variation of the form wherein the couplets were separated by interjected lines, causing the scheme to gain complexity.

Following the publication of Nosce Teipsum, other poets in the English language also began to break free from the heroic couplet in their longer works. In 1650 William Davenant published the preface to his epic poem Gondibert, which was intended to contain five parts, similar to a five-act play. In letter to Davenant, Thomas Hobbes, whom Davenant had met in Paris as a Royalist in exile, stated that he believed the poetic form Davenant intended to use in his poem would greatly change the course of poetry by opening up new possibilities for poetic expression. However, Hobbes freely admitted that he knew little about poetry before he attempted to explain his thoughts on literary theory. While Hobbes praised Davenant's intention to write a poem of the scope of Gondibert, the work was never completed, and Davenant's most significant contribution to the development of the form came from his influence on Dryden, who would prove to be the decasyllabic quatrain's most prominent practitioner.

When Dryden published Annus Mirabilis in 1667, the form he used for the long poem was that of the decasyllabic quatrain. The poem achieved prominence quickly, as it discussed the year of 1666, during which many disasters had plagued the people of England. The poem contained 1216 lines of verse in 304 stanzas, each with a period at the end to show a "completeness" in each stanza. While the form had achieved fame with other poets of Dryden's era and was considered "fashionable" by figures of the literary world, Dryden's poem quickly became known as the standard-bearer of the genre.

== Elegiac decasyllabic quatrain ==
In 1751, Thomas Gray published "Elegy Written in a Country Churchyard", composed in the heroic stanza. Written in iambic pentameter, the poem followed the same metrical and structural patterns seen in Annus Mirabilis, but the use of the poetic form in an elegy gave it the title of the "elegiac decasyllabic quatrain". Other writers of Gray's time also wrote heroic stanzas about topics similar to those in Elegy, such as Thomas Warton in Pleasures of Melancholy and William Collins in Ode to Evening. While the topic chosen for these quatrains appealed to the novel literary devices of Gray's period with emphasis on melancholy and by taking place in the evening, Gray's contemporaries did not believe that the heroic quatrain, which was commonly used in the era, was dramatically changed or altered in the poems.

== Criticisms of the form ==
When discussing the auditory impression created by the sound of the decasyllabic quatrain, Ralph Waldo Emerson described how he would hum the tune created by the pattern of the rhyme scheme then long to fill the sounds in with the words of a poem. However, Henry David Thoreau, when writing about Emerson's "Ode to Beauty" criticizes the use of the decasyllabic quatrain by suggesting that its tune is unworthy of the thoughts expressed.

George Saintsbury, in A History of English Prosody from the Twelfth Century to the Present Day, argues that the heroic quatrain, while breaking from the conventions of the heroic couplet, contains limitations that outweigh its liberating characteristics. To Saintsbury, the decasyllabic quatrain contains a stiffness that can not be overcome:

You can not vary your stops, as in blank verse or the Spenserian, there is not room enough: and the recurrent divisions necessatated by the stanza lack at once the conciseness and the continuity of the couplet, the variety and amplitude of the rhyme-royal, octave, or Spenserian itself.

In his essay on Annus Mirabilis, A. W. Ward suggests that the decasyllabic quatrain used by Davenant and Dryden, with its insistence on providing each quatrain with the "completeness" given by the final period, causes the verse to strike the reader as "prosy". While Ward respects Dryden's willingness to use a new form despite his mastery of the heroic couplet, he believes that Annus Mirabilis exemplifies the weaknesses of the form and hinders Dryden's ability to use poetry to fully express his philosophical conceits. Saintsbury, agreeing with this assessment, suggested that Dryden's choice to revert to the heroic couplet for his three poems on the restoration.
