= Thomas Baltzar =

German violinist and composer (c. 1630 – 1663)

- Born: 1630s Free City of Lübeck, Holy Roman Empire
- Died: 24 July 1663 Kingdom of England
- Genres: Baroque music
- Occupation(s): violinist, composer

Thomas Baltzar (c. 1630 – 24 July 1663) was a German violinist and composer. He was born in Lübeck to a musical family; his father, grandfather, and great-grandfather were all musicians. Sources suggest an array of music teachers who may have taught him in his early years. According to the writings of Samuel Hartlib, composer and violinist Johann Schop was one of those instructors. Baltzar may have studied the violin with Gregor Zuber and composition with Franz Tunder. He may have also received instruction from composer and violinist Nicolaus Bleyer, who taught Baltzar's younger brother.

Through contacts at Germany's embassy in Sweden (where, by 1653, Baltzar was employed), he may have come in contact with English musicians accompanying Bulstrode Whitelocke's mission to Queen Christina. This possible encounter may have been the impetus for Baltzar's decision to emigrate to England in 1655, leaving behind his newly attained position of Ratslutenist of Lübeck (he had returned briefly to his home city, probably shortly after Christina's abdication in June 1654). Hartlib's writings indicate that the Swedish ambassador to England, Christer Bonde, took in Baltzar.

Baltzar's arrival in England was met with acclaim. On 4 March 1656 he performed the violin at the residence of Roger L'Estrange, where John Evelyn was in attendance. Evelyn wrote in his Diary that night:

This night I was invited by Mr. Rog: L'Estrange to heare the incomperable Lubicer on the Violin, his variety upon a few notes & plaine ground with that wonderfull dexterity, as was admirable, & though a very young man, yet so perfect & skillful as there was nothing so crosse & perplext, which being by our Artists, brought to him, which he did not at first sight, with ravishing sweetenesse & improvements, play off, to the astonishment of our best Masters: In Summ, he plaid on that single Instrument a full Consort, so as the rest, flung-downe their Instruments, as acknowledging a victory.

In September 1656, Baltzar was listed as one of the musicians who helped premiere The Siege of Rhodes in London, thought to have been the first all-sung English opera. Two years later, according to Anthony Wood, he was employed as a private musician for Sir Anthony Cope at Hanwell House in Banbury. Wood, who had heard Baltzar play at a performance in Warden John Wilkins's lodgings at Wadham College, Oxford, described his "very great astonishment" at the German's skill. "[I] saw him run his fingers to the end of the finger-board of the violin, and run them back insensibly," he wrote, "and all with alacrity and in very good tune, which [I] nor any in England saw the like before." Also in attendance was John Wilson, a professor of music at the University of Oxford, who, according to Wood, bowed at Baltzar's feet after the performance. However, Wood also observed of Baltzar that "he was given to excessive drinking."

On 23 December 1661 Baltzar entered Charles II's service as a leader of the king's private music ensemble, the "four and twenty fiddlers," succeeding Davis Mell in the post. He was given an annual salary of £110, a high figure for the time. Some of Baltzar's surviving compositions, including a work in C major that may be the earliest suite for three violins, require virtuosity and technical mastery. According to Wood, Baltzar's drinking habits contributed to his death. He was buried in the cloisters of Westminster Abbey on 27 July 1663.
