= The Indian Emperour =

Restoration heroic drama by John Dryden

The Indian Emperour, or the Conquest of Mexico by the Spaniards, being the Sequel of The Indian Queen is an English Restoration era stage play, a heroic drama written by John Dryden that was first performed in the Spring of 1665. The play has been considered a defining work in the subgenre of heroic drama, in which "rhymed heroic tragedy comes into full being." As its subtitle indicates, the play deals with the Spanish conquest of the Aztec Empire under Hernán Cortés.

The play depicts both Montezuma and Cortés facing personal problems while engaged in their conflict. In an anachronism, Francisco Pizarro is depicted as the play's cruel and oppressive villain. The writer used Sir William Davenant's The Cruelty of the Spaniards in Peru (1658), and the Spanish accounts of the conquest in Purchas his Pilgrimes (1625 edition) as his main sources for the depictions of the Spaniards.

== Performance ==
The premiere production was staged by the King's Company at the Theatre Royal, Drury Lane; it featured Michael Mohun as the Emperor, Charles Hart as Cortez, Edward Kynaston as Guyomar, Nicholas Burt as Vasquez, William Wintershall as Odmar, William Cartwright as the Priest, and Anne Marshall as Almeria. The original production employed a "gorgeously feathered cloak" that Aphra Behn had brought back from Surinam, along with "glorious wreaths for...heads, necks, arms, legs." Dryden spiced his play with crowd-pleasing features, including incantations and conjured spirits, and an elaborate grotto scene with "a Fountain spouting."

On opening night, Dryden had a program distributed to the audience, on the connection between this play and his earlier The Indian Queen (a collaboration with his brother-in-law Sir Robert Howard). When the Duke of Buckingham and his collaborators satirised Dryden in The Rehearsal (1671), they had their Dryden-substitute Bayes say "that he had printed many reams to instill into the audience some conception of his plot."

The play was a major popular success, and was revived in 1667, with Nell Gwyn as Cydaria and Mary Knep in the role of Alibech. Samuel Pepys saw a performance; though he was an admirer of Gwyn, he condemned her performance in the role of the Emperour's daughter, calling it "a great and serious part, which she do most basely."

The play was also given an amateur performance at Court in 1668, which included James Scott, 1st Duke of Monmouth and his Duchess in the cast. Pepys criticised the elite cast as mostly "fools and stocks"—though he did not actually see the production in question.

== Publication ==
The play was first published in 1667 by Henry Herringman. Dryden dedicated the play to Ann Scott, Duchess of Monmouth and Buccleuch, whom he called his "first and best patroness." Subsequent editions followed in 1668, 1670, 1681, 1686, 1692, 1694, and 1696, all from Herringman; the 1692 edition coincided with another stage revival.

== Sources ==
Dryden's sources for his play, both historical and literary, have been disputed and debated. Two sources of major significance were Sir William Davenant's The Cruelty of the Spaniards in Peru (1658), and the Spanish accounts of the conquest in Purchas his Pilgrimes (1625 edition). Dryden also took plot elements from a play by Pedro Calderón de la Barca, El príncipe constante (c. 1628–29), which Dryden read in the original Spanish. One aspect of Dryden's plot, Guyomar and Odmar's competition for Alibech, comes from Georges de Scudéry's poem Alaric (1654).

In turn, Voltaire borrowed from Dryden's play for his drama Alzire.

== Plot ==
In his play, Dryden presents the type of conflict between love and honour that is typical of his serious drama. Montezuma refuses a chance to save his kingdom from conquest, for personal reasons:

But of my crown thou too much care dost take;
That which I value more, my love's at stake.

Cortez takes the opposite course, turning his back on his love for Cydaria to obey the orders of his king, even though he acknowledges that those orders are flawed. Montezuma gets the worst of their conflict; tortured by the Spaniards, he ends the play with his suicide.

Dryden wanted to portray Cortez as high-minded and magnanimous; but he also wanted to show the Spaniards as cruel and oppressive. He managed this by the wildly ahistorical recourse of bringing Francisco Pizarro into the play as a subordinate of Cortez, and making Pizarro the villain.

Modern critics have studied the play from feminist and anti-colonialist viewpoints.
