= The Cruelty of the Spaniards in Peru =

1658 theatrical presentation

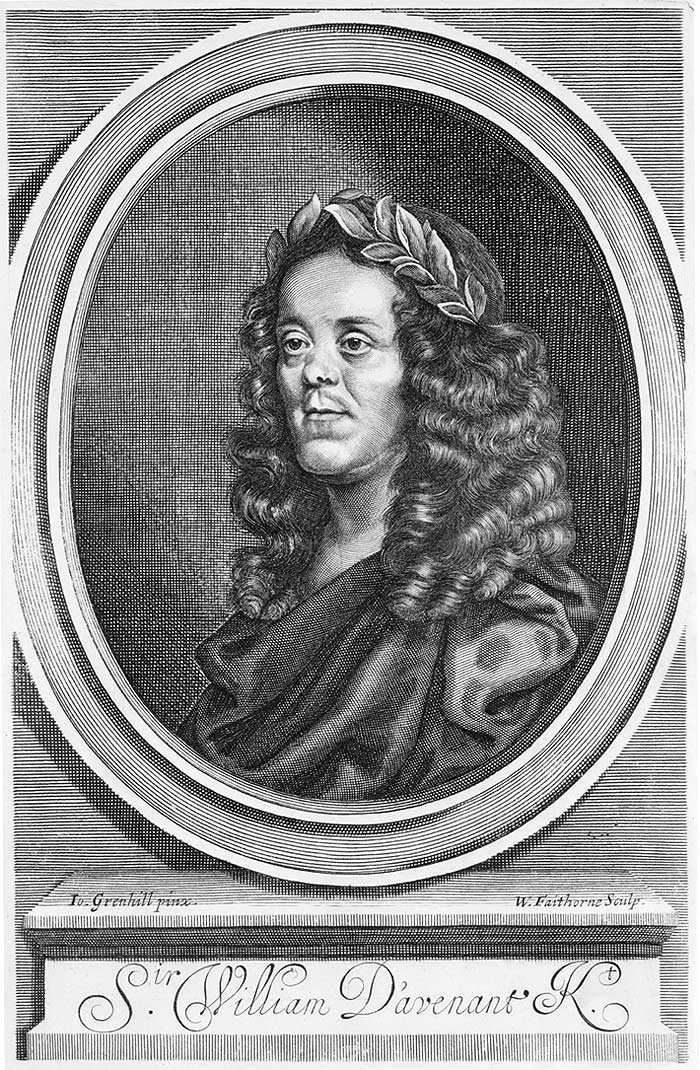
William Davenant

The Cruelty of the Spaniards in Peru was an innovative 1658 theatrical presentation, a hybrid entertainment or masque or "operatic show", written and produced by Sir William Davenant. The music was composed by Matthew Locke.

The work was significant in the evolution of English opera and musical theatre, and also of English drama; Davenant brought into the public theatre the techniques of scenery and painted backdrops that had previously been employed only in the courtly masque. It was by presenting his work in a musical rather than a dramatic context that Davenant was able to circumvent the Puritan Commonwealth's prohibition on plays. Indeed, Lord Protector Oliver Cromwell encouraged the production of this work and Davenant's ensuing The History of Sir Francis Drake (1659) as anti-Spanish propaganda. (The English had been at war with Spain since 1655.)

== The show ==
The Cruelty was presented at the Cockpit Theatre in the summer of 1658; it was on the stage by July. The work consists of six scenes or tableaux, called "Entries," each of which starts with a speech by the Chief Priest of Peru and proceeds to a song. The Chief Priest was dressed in a "Garment of Feathers" and a "bonnet" with an "ornament of Plumes." He carried "the Figure of the Sun on his Bonnet and Breast" because "the Peruvians were worshippers of the Sun."

The first Entry shows the Peruvians in their state of innocence; the second displays the arrival of the Spaniards. The third is devoted to the quarrel and civil war between "the two Royall Brethren, sons of the last Inca." The fourth displays the Spanish conquest of the Incas, and the fifth, their oppression and torture. The sixth celebrates the arrival of English soldiers, their defeat of the Spanish and rescue of the Peruvians (which, Davenant acknowledged, was something that had not yet occurred in reality).

Davenant loaded his show with extras and diversions. Between the Entries, the audience was amused with acrobats who performed "the Trick of Activity, called the Sea-horse," as well as the "Porpoise" and the "double Somerset," plus two trained apes walking a tightrope.

== The music ==
The vocal music for The Cruelty has not survived, and the identity of the composers is not known with certainty. Locke was involved in both The Siege of Rhodes and Francis Drake, the Davenant works that preceded and succeeded The Cruelty, and is therefore a logical candidate for The Cruelty also. In addition to Locke, the other composers involved in The Siege of Rhodes — Henry Lawes, George Hudson, Charles Coleman, and Captain Henry Cooke — are natural possibilities for composers for The Cruelty.

== Publication ==
The work was entered into the Stationers' Register on 30 November 1658, and was published soon after in a quarto issued by the bookseller Henry Herringman, under the fulsome title The Cruelty of the Spaniards in Peru. Exprest by Instrumentall and Vocall Musick, and by the Art of Perspective in Scenes, &c. represented daily at the Cockpit in Drury-Lane, At Three after noone punctually. The printed text was unusual in that it was intended for release while the stage production was continuing. At the end of the text was printed this advertisement: "Notwithstanding the great expense necessary to scenes, and to other ornaments in this entertainment, there is a good provision made of places for a shilling. And it shall begin certainly at three afternoon."

This was a polar reversal of earlier practice in English Renaissance theatre, in which the actors tried to keep their plays out of print. Davenant and Herringman appear to have attempted a synergistic approach that foreshadowed modern marketing, with the stage production and the printed text complementing and promoting each other. (Though it is unknown if Davenant's stage show was still playing at the Cockpit as late as November.)

Davenant later used the text of his entertainment as Act IV of his The Playhouse to Be Let (1663).

== Sources ==
As a source for his text, Davenant depended upon The Tears of the Indians, John Phillips' 1656 translation of the Brevísima relación de la destrucción de las Indias by Bartolomé de las Casas (1551). Davenant also used the Comentarios Reales of Garcilaso de la Vega (El Inca) (1609), which was translated into French in 1633.

In turn, John Dryden employed The Cruelty of the Spaniards in Peru as a source for his 1665 play The Indian Emperour.
