= George Hudson (composer) =

English Baroque composer

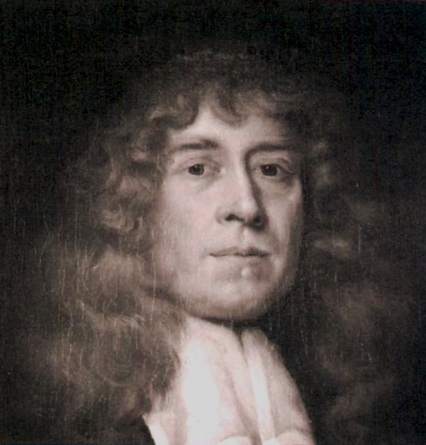

George Hudson (c. 1615 – 1672) was an English violinist, lutenist, singer, and composer of Baroque music.

In collaboration with Charles Coleman, Hudson composed the instrumental score for The Siege of Rhodes, considered by music historians to be the first English opera.

== Life ==
According to his contemporary Anthony Wood, Hudson may have begun his career as a dancing master. The first time Hudson's name appears in an official capacity, however, is in 1641, when he was granted membership into the King's court ensemble of "lutes and voices" by royal warrant. Though Hudson ultimately lost his position during the power struggles of the Civil War, he maintained a professional presence in London as an instructor of viol and voice.

In May 1656, Hudson and several of his colleagues, including Cooke and Lawes, were commissioned by the impresario William Davenant to compose music for First Day's Entertainment at Rutland House, a moral disputation consisting of music, dance, and declamation. Later that year, Hudson joined the creative team for Davenant's subsequent work The Siege of Rhodes, for which Hudson co-wrote the instrumental music with Charles Coleman.

After the Restoration, Hudson was appointed master of the King's violins, one of the positions of leadership over which the Master of the King's Music, Nicholas Lanier, was granted nominal control. Hudson directed the violins first in cooperation with Davis Mell and then Matthew Locke, the latter of whom Hudson had collaborated on Davenant's stage works several years prior.

By January 1672, Hudson had fallen gravely ill. No longer able to fulfill his compositional duties at the court, Hudson was assisted without fee by Pelham Humphrey and Thomas Purcell, the uncle of Henry. Upon Hudson's death, Humphrey and Purcell were appointed to the composer's previous post.

== Works ==
Hudson is best known for his contributions to First Day's Entertainment at Rutland House (1656) and The Siege of Rhodes (1656), the score and parts for which are now lost. Several of Hudson's dances were published in two of John Playford's collections, Musick's Recreation on the Lyra Viol (1652) and Court Ayres (1655). Additional sheet music, including original manuscripts, are held at the British Library, Bodleian Library, Christ Church Library, and others, both inside and outside of the United Kingdom.
