= The Playhouse to Be Let =

Stage play by Sir William Davenant

The Playhouse to be Let is a Restoration stage play, a dramatic anthology of short pieces by Sir William Davenant that was acted in August 1663 at the theatre at Lincoln's Inn Fields, and first published in the 1673 collected edition of Davenant's works. The Playhouse to Be Let is noteworthy for providing the first English translation of a play by Molière.

== Form and content ==
Regarding this anthology, the early critic Gerard Langbaine wrote, "I know not under what Species to place this Play, it consisting of several Pieces of different Kinds handsomely tackt together...." Davenant exploited the standard five-Act structure of drama in his era to link five separate short plays, both newly written and previously existent:

- Act I provides an Introduction to the items that follow, in which four troupes of actors audition to fill a vacant theatre;
- Act II is a condensation of Molière's 1660 one-act play Sganarelle, translated into French-accented broken English;
- Act III is Davenant's 1659 "operatic tableau" The History of Sir Francis Drake;
- Act IV is Davenant's similar 1658 work The Cruelty of the Spaniards in Peru;
- Act V is the "Tragedy Travestie," a burlesque of traditional tragedy, involving Julius Caesar, Marc Antony, and Cleopatra.

The material in Act I provides a detailed view of a theatre manager interacting with actors, that throws light upon the theatrical conditions of Davenant's day. The anthology's blend of serious and comic works has caused critics to wonder about authorial intent, and even authorial identity.

== Authorship ==
Davenant's authorship of the material in Acts III and IV is not disputed. French scholar André de Mandach attributed the rest of the work to Colonel Henry Howard. Henry Howard was one of four playwriting brothers; Sir Robert Howard, Edward Howard, and James Howard being his siblings. The Playhouse to Be Let was in fact attributed to Col. Howard during the eighteenth century.

Mandach argues that Davenant, as a practitioner of heroic drama, was unlikely to have ridiculed it. His argument has in general not persuaded other critics. In the play itself, Davenant writes that "burlesque discovers laughter not in the objects of its hatred, but rather in the objects of its affections."

== Influence ==
The playlet in Act V of The Playhouse to Be Let has been called "the earliest burlesque dramatic piece in the English language." Davenant's comedy had a direct influence on The Rehearsal, the famous 1671 satire by the Duke of Buckingham and his collaborators.
