= Davis Mell =

English clockmaker and violinist (1604–1662)

Davis Mell (also David or Davy; 15 November 1604 – 27 April 1662) was an English clockmaker and violinist.

He was born at Wilton, Wiltshire near Salisbury the son of a servant of William Herbert, 3rd Earl of Pembroke. He was primarily a clockmaker, and was, until the middle of the seventeenth century, accounted the first violinist in England in point of skill. He may be said to occupy the position of the earliest English violinist of note. Anthony Wood says that Mell was "one of the musick to King Charles I," and "had a sweet stroke."

According to the same authority, Mell visited Oxford in March 1657–8, when "Peter Pett, Will Bull, Ken Digby, and others of Allsoules did give him a very handsome entertainment in the Taverne, called 'The Salutation,' in St. Marie's Parish. The company did look upon Mr. Mell to have a prodigious hand on the violin, and they thought that no person, as all in London did, could goe beyond him. But when Tho Baltzar, an Outlander, came to Oxon in the next yeare, they had other thoughts of Mr. Mell, who tho he played farr sweeter than Baltzar, yet Baltzar's hand was more quick." Elsewhere Wood describes Mell as "a well-bred gentleman, and not given to excessive drinking as Baltzar was." Wood seems to have entertained him at Oxford in August 1658.

Mell was conjointly with George Hudson the first "Master of the Music," or leader of Charles II's "four and twenty fiddlers," a band of twenty-four performers on the violin, tenor, and bass, instituted by the king in 1660 in imitation of Louis XIV's Les Vingt-quatre Violons du Roi. He was succeeded in 1661 by Baltzar.

Some of Mell's compositions for the instrument are to be found in Christopher Simpson's Division Viol (1659). In John Aubrey's Miscellanies is an account of a child of Davis Mell, who was cured of a crooked back by the touch of a dead hand.
