= The Mock Tempest =

1674 play by Thomas Duffet

The Mock Tempest, or The Enchanted Castle
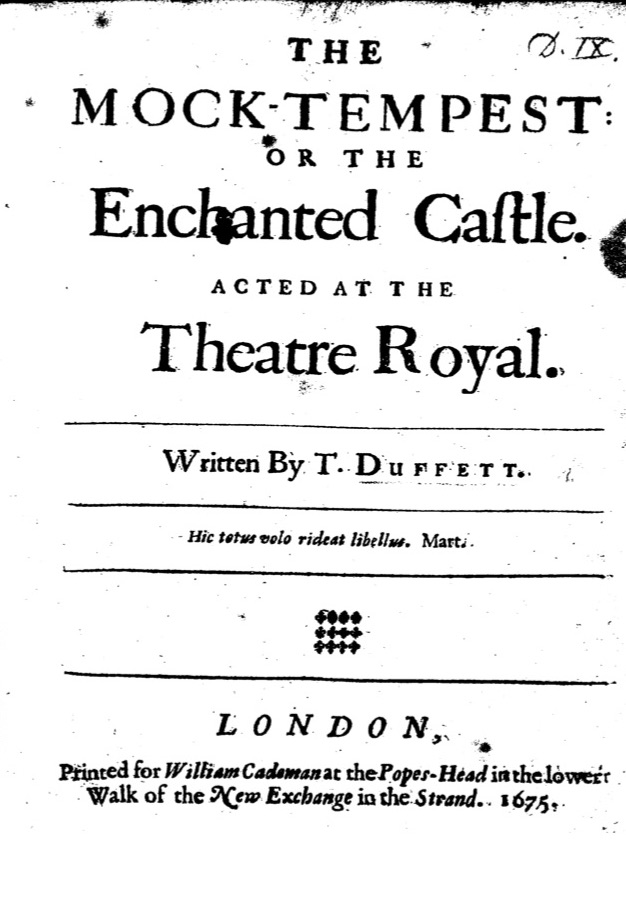
- Front Page of Thomas Duffett's "The Mock-Tempest, Or the Enchanted Castle." The British Library. 1675.
- Written by: Thomas Duffet
- Subject: Parody of Dryden–Davenant adaptation of The Tempest
- Genre: Burlesque / Parody

Premiere
- Date: 19 November 1674
- Place: Theatre Royal, Drury Lane (London)

The Mock Tempest, or the Enchanted Castle is a Restoration era stage play and parody by Thomas Duffet; it premiered in 1674, and was first printed in 1675 by the bookseller William Cademan. In creating his farce, Duffet's target was not William Shakespeare's famous play The Tempest, but the adaptation of it that John Dryden and Sir William Davenant wrote in the 1660s. According to critic Michael West, "There are frequent nautical metaphors, and 'more noyse and terrour than a Tempest at Sea'...."

== Background ==
The first Theatre Royal, Drury Lane burned down on 25 January 1672. Its occupant, the King's Company, suddenly faced a major problem, and a great disadvantage compared to the rival Duke's Company. One way in which the King's troupe responded to their situation was by staging parodies of their rivals' popular successes. One of those successes was The Tempest, or the Enchanted Island, the Dryden–Davenant adaptation that had first been staged in 1667. In 1674 that work had been mounted in a new musical or "operatic" version, prepared by Thomas Shadwell. Duffet, a minor dramatist and songwriter, produced his lampoon before the end of that year; The Mock Tempest likely premiered on 19 November 1674. "The Design of this Play was to draw the Town from the Duke's Theatre, who for a considerable amount of time had frequented that admirable reviv'd comedy called The Tempest."

== Plot ==
Duffet's Mock Tempest is set not in any exotic location, but securely in the London familiar to its audience, specifically the lower reaches of contemporaneous London society. The storm that opens the play, in both the Shakespeare and Dryden–Davenant versions, is replaced in Duffet's by a riot in a brothel. Mother Stephania, a bawd, leads her cohort of pimps, prostitutes, and aristocratic customers in a valiant but vain effort to drive off an assault from the town's apprentices. The local watch carries off all the participants to Bridewell prison (the "enchanted castle"); there, the jailkeeper Prospero Whiffe reveals that the raid on the brothel was inspired by his ethereal spirit Ariel, a pickpocket.

The parody goes on to mangle the romances of Prospero's two daughters (called Dorinda and Miranda, in Dryden and Davenant's adaptation). Dryden and Davenant made Miranda and Dorinda ignorant of the opposite sex; Duffet's "Dorinda and Miranda" are very familiar with men, but get confused by the concept of a "husband":

Dorinda: Husband, what's that?
Miranda: Why that's a thing like a man (for aught I know) with a great pair of horns upon his head, and my father said 'twas made for women, look ye.
Dorinda: What, must we ride to water upon't, sister?
Miranda: No, no, it must be our slave, and give us golden clothes, pray, that other men may lie with us in a civil way, and then it must father our children and keep them.
Dorinda: And when we are so old and ugly that nobody else will lie with us, must it lie with us itself?
Miranda: Aye, that it must, sister.

Along the way, Duffet mocks Davenant's musical adaptation of Macbeth, staged in 1664 but first printed in 1674. (Duffet also ridicules Davenent's Macbeth in his Epilogue to his burlesque of Elkanah Settle's The Empress of Morocco, another work of 1674.) The Duke of Mantua has a son who is a member of the Religious Society of Friends, satirically named "Quakero." The play is wide in scope, touching on "drunkenness, violence, mutilation, cannibalism; of pimping, prostitution, adultery, incest; of hypocrisy, cowardice, torture, execution; of urine, vermin, venereal disease; of deviance, dissolution, and death".

The last act of Duffet's play features a parody of Ariel's song "Where the bee sucks, there suck I" from the final scene of The Tempest. Duffet's version is "Where good ale is, there suck I". The parody version was sung by Betty Mackerel, an orange vender who was promoted to the stage.

The Mock Tempest may have been revived in 1682.

== Modern adaptation ==
A modern adaptation of The Mock Tempest was mounted by Shakespeare Santa Cruz in 2007.
