= The Siege of Rhodes =

Opera written to a text by William Davenant

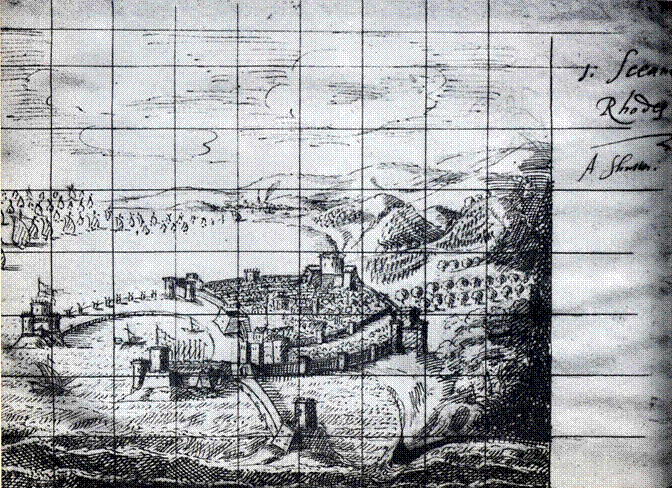
A view of Rhodes, designed by Inigo Jones' pupil John Webb, to be painted on a backshutter for the first performance of Davenant's opera The Siege of Rhodes "in recitative music" in May 1656, at Rutland House.

The Siege of Rhodes is a 1656 opera written to a text by the impresario William Davenant. The score is by five composers, the vocal music by Henry Lawes, Matthew Locke, and Captain Henry Cooke, and the instrumental music by Charles Coleman and George Hudson. It is considered to be the first English opera.

The opera depicts the 1522 siege of Rhodes by the Ottoman Navy of Suleiman the Magnificent. The opera debuted in a small private theatre at Davenant's Rutland House, as dramatic performances were outlawed and all public theatres had been closed by the Puritan government of Oliver Cromwell. Davenant still had to obtain a special permission for his work to be performed, but he convinced Cromwell's government that it was merely a production of "recitative music" instead of a new type of dramatic performance.

This opera's debut featured a performance by Catherine Coleman, England's first professional actress. Coleman was a daughter of the composer Alfonso Ferrabosco, and was married at the time to the professional musician Edward Coleman. In the 1661 revival of the opera, the main female role of Roxelana, chief consort of Suleiman the Magnificent, was performed by Hester Davenport.

== Special permit ==
Part 1 of The Siege of Rhodes was first performed in a small private theatre constructed at Davenant's home, Rutland House, in 1656. Special permission had to be obtained from the Puritan government of Oliver Cromwell, as dramatic performances were outlawed and all public theatres closed. Davenant managed to obtain this by calling the production "recitative music", music being still permissible within the law. When published in 1656, it was under the equivocating title The siege of Rhodes made a representation by the art of prospective in scenes, and the story sung in recitative musick, at the back part of Rutland-House in the upper end of Aldersgate-Street, London. The 1659 reprinting gives the location at the Cock-pit in Drury Lane, a well-known theatre frequented by Samuel Pepys after the Stuart Restoration (1660). Pepys himself later read the text and commented in his Diary that it was "certainly (the more I read it the more I think so) the best poem that ever was wrote."

== Production ==
The Rutland House production included England's first professional actress, Mrs Coleman. (Note: Catherine Coleman was the daughter of composer Alfonso Ferrabosco and wife of another performer, Edward Coleman; Edward would be appointed Musician in Ordinary to the royal court after the restoration of King Charles.) Part 2 of The Siege of Rhodes followed in the 1657–1659 season and was first published in 1663.

In 1661, the piece was rewritten to take advantage of the skills of the young actresses now in Davenant's Company, and this revival introduced Hester Davenport as Roxelana, chief consort of Suleiman the Magnificent. .

== Lost score ==
The plot was based on the 1522 siege of Rhodes, when the island was besieged by the Ottoman Navy of Suleiman the Magnificent. The score of the opera is believed to be lost. However, the original sketches by John Webb for the stage sets, themselves an innovation of the day, are extant.

== See also ==
- The Cruelty of the Spaniards in Peru
- The History of Sir Francis Drake
- Lovers Made Men
- Restoration spectacular
