= Rutland House =

Houses occupied by Dukes of Rutland

Coordinates: 51.519052°N 0.096946°W

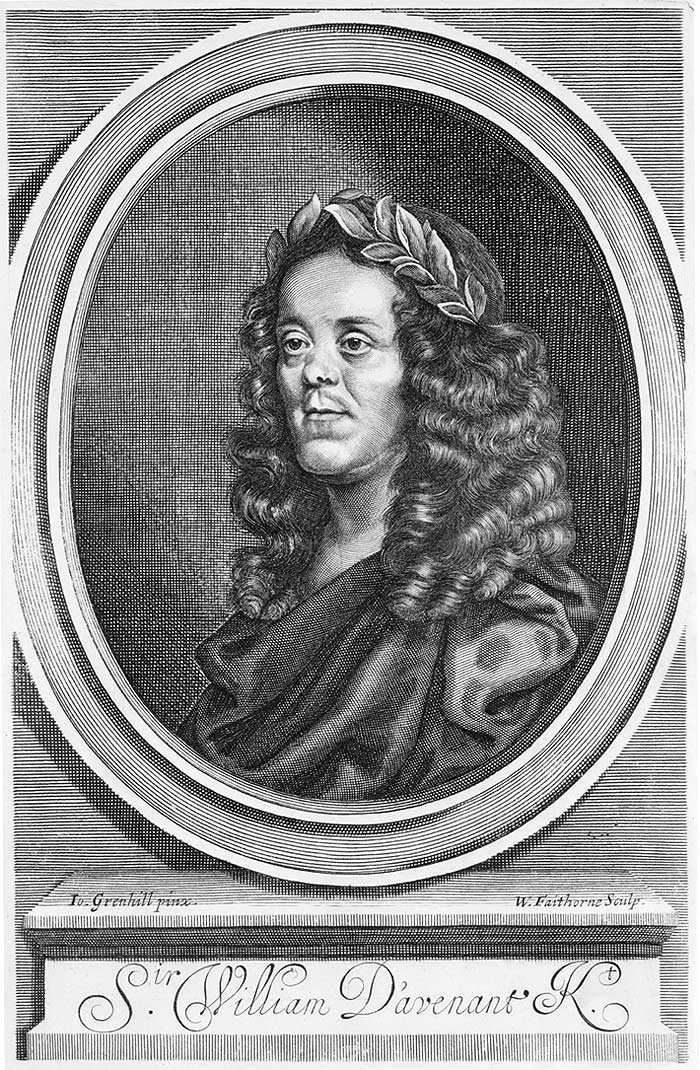
William Davenant, owner of Rutland House, Aldersgate Street.

Rutland House was the name of at least three London houses occupied by the Earls and Dukes of Rutland. That on Aldersgate Street was leased by playwright Sir William Davenant, who converted a room of it into a private theatre in the 1650s. That in Knightsbridge was a six-acre site until its demolition in the 1830s. The third is located on Park Place in St James's.

== Rutland House, Aldersgate Street ==
Rutland House on Aldersgate Street, near Charterhouse Square in the City of London, close to Smithfield Market, was leased by the playwright and impresario Sir William Davenant (1606–1668).

In 1656, freshly released from imprisonment, Davenant turned a room of the house into what was, at first, a private theatre performing his own plays. Soon the performances were advertised and semi-open to the public at a cost of 5 shillings a head, a figure that ensured that only persons of quality would be able to attend. The reason for Rutland House being used rather than a conventional theatre was to overcome the laws of censorship which operated in all public places following the closures of all public theatres by the Puritan government of Oliver Cromwell.

The house seems to have been not totally suitable for theatrical use; however, a low narrow hall, or salon, at the rear of the house was adapted for the performances. Rather than sitting in comfort, the audience had to sit on improvised benches, and so confined was the space available that the benches had to be arranged at an angle to the small stage to accommodate the large audiences who came. The small stage, described by Davenant as a "Cup-board stage", was adorned with gold and purple curtains. Above the stage in what was contemporarily described as a "louver hole" was concealed a small orchestra.

Davenant had seen Italian opera sung in Paris; this inspired him to conceive a cunning plan: as the Puritan government had no objection to music, only drama, he obtained permission to stage a performance of his opera The Siege of Rhodes, to be sung in "recitative music". Thus, the first English opera was performed at Rutland House in May 1656, simultaneously overcoming the prohibition of drama. The Rutland House production also included England's first professional actress, Mrs. Coleman and was later transferred to the Cockpit Theatre in Drury Lane.

Davenant established at least two other "private performance houses" in Lincoln's Inn Fields and Drury Lane. After Davenant opened more conventional theatres, he continued to use Rutland House to preview new productions, to gauge audience reaction.

== Rutland House, Knightsbridge ==
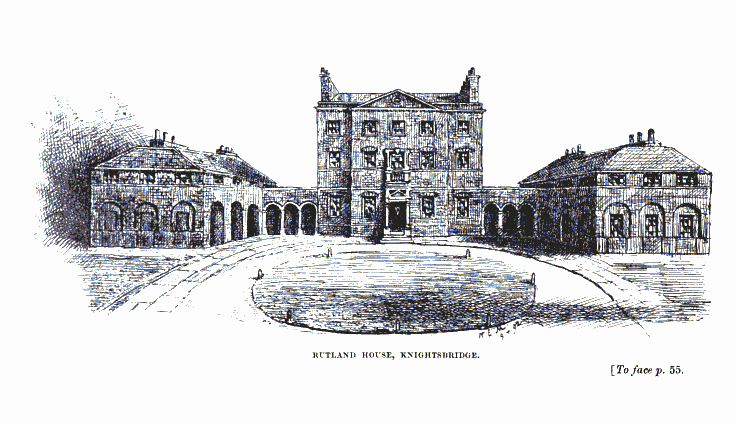
Rutland House, Knightsbridge

Crop of Christopher and John Greenwood's 8 inch-to-mile map published in 1827 from an 1830 republication (click to view all). In the far west is Kingston House. In the north-east is Hyde Park Barracks.

This was built for John Manners, 3rd Duke of Rutland. It enjoyed at first a rectangular plot of 6 acres (2.4 ha) in Knightsbridge London, however by its destruction had sold off the north-east quarter for two large houses, one of which, Kent House, likely already served as a subsidiary.

The house stood from the mid 18th century until it was demolished in 1836.

== Rutland House, Park Place, St James's ==
The third Rutland House was built in 1734 by the architect James Gibbs for the dowager Duchess of Norfolk (born Maria Shireburn). Originally her home at 16 Arlington Street, the house was renamed in 1816 when it was bought by John Manners, 5th Duke of Rutland.

The building was extensively rebuilt after a fire in 1902, but retains many of the original features and is the only surviving London townhouse by Gibbs.

Rutland House was sold to the Royal Over-Seas League in 1934 after the death of Henry Manners, 8th Duke of Rutland, and is now amalgamated with two other buildings as a part of Over-Seas House on Park Place. The gatehouse, built as part of the house by Gibbs, is now a separate property, 16 Arlington Street,

=== Rutland Gate ===
Rutland Gate is a double-square of grand houses around two tree-planted narrow communal greens was engineered and erected on its site, save for №s 48C to 65 which come from the land to the west. Many of its buildings are listed.
