= Thomas Cademan =

English recusant physician

Sir Thomas Cademan (1590?–1651) was an English recusant physician.

== Life ==
Cademan was born in Norfolk about 1590. He was educated at Trinity College, Cambridge, and proceeded B.A. in 1606 and M.A. in 1609. He then took the degree of M.D. at the University of Padua in March 1620. In May and June 1623, he passed his examination with the College of Physicians of London, and was ordered to become incorporated at one of the English universities.

In 1626, Cademan was returned to the parliamentary commission by the College as a Catholic. He was then residing in Fetter Lane. Two years later he was noted as a recusant, residing in Westminster. He afterwards is mentioned as living at St. Martin's-in-the-Fields. It is supposed that his religious views delayed his admission to the college. He apparently was never incorporated at Oxford or Cambridge. It was not till 3 December 1630 that he became licentiate of the College; on 22 December he was admitted a fellow.

By 16 December 1626, Cademan was appointed physician in ordinary to Queen Henrietta Maria.

== Business interests ==
Cademan and Sir William Brouncker had a patent for stilling and brewing in a house at the back of St. James's Park, and this patent, they note in 1633, they had already exercised for many years. On 4 August 1638, on consideration of a petition to government presented in March previous, Sir Theodore de Mayerne, Cademan, and others distillers of spirits and makers of vinegar in London, were incorporated as "Distillers of London". Cademan and Mayerne were asked to set up rules of the corporation. The Company of Apothecaries petitioned against it in September as infringing their monopoly. To this petition Mayerne, Brouncker, and Cademan replied, and the undertaking was allowed to proceed, and in 1638 was published The Distiller of London, compiled and set forth by the special Licence and Command of the King's most Excellent Majesty for the sole use of the Company of Distillers of London, and by them to bee duly observed and practiced. It is explained in the preface as book of rules and directions concerning distillation of strong waters and making vinegars. The name of Thomas Cademan as first master of the company is appended. Another edition of the Distiller was published in 1652.

In 1649 Cademan was chosen anatomy lecturer to the College of Physicians, but was lax in the post. He became an elect 25 June 1650, and died 2 May 1651.

== Works ==
Cademan was physician to Francis Russell, 4th Earl of Bedford, of whose death he wrote an account in a pamphlet of six pages, The Earle of Bedford's passage to the Highest Court of Parliament, 9 May 1641, about tenne a clock in the morning (1641).

== Family ==
Cademan treated William Davenant in 1630; and Davenant later married his widow Anne. Cademan had an adult son in 1641. He has been identified with John Cademan, M.D., recommended on 22 June 1640 by the College of Physicians for appointment to the office of physician to the army.
