= George Hudson (cricketer) =

English cricketer

Personal information
- Full name: George Neville Hudson
- Born: 12 July 1905; Clitheroe, Lancashire, England
- Died: 24 November 1981 (aged 76); Preston, Lancashire, England
- Batting: Unknown
- Bowling: Right-arm slow

Domestic team information
- Years: Team
- 1936: Lancashire

Career statistics
Competition	First-class
Matches	2
Runs scored	1
Batting average	1.00
100s/50s	–/–
Top score	1
Balls bowled	150
Wickets	–
Bowling average	–
5 wickets in innings	–
10 wickets in match	–
Best bowling	–
Catches/stumpings	1/–
- Source: Cricinfo, 27 May 2013

George Neville Hudson (12 July 1905 – 24 November 1981) was an English cricketer. Hudson's batting style is unknown, though it is known he was a right-arm slow bowler. He was born at Clitheroe, Lancashire.

Hudson made two first-class appearances for Lancashire in 1936, one in the County Championship against Derbyshire, and another against the touring Indians. His brief first-class career yielded a single run, and no wickets from 25 overs bowled. He later played club cricket for Bacup in the Lancashire League from 1946 to 1948.

He died at Preston, Lancashire on 24 November 1981.
