= The History of Sir Francis Drake =

Masque or "operatic tableau" with a libretto by Sir William Davenant

The History of Sir Francis Drake was a hybrid theatrical entertainment, a masque or "operatic tableau" with an English libretto written by Sir William Davenant and music by Matthew Locke. The masque was most likely first performed in 1659 and produced by Davenant. As with his earlier The Siege of Rhodes (1656) and The Cruelty of the Spaniards in Peru (1658), Davenant cast The History of Sir Francis Drake as a musical drama to avoid the Puritan prohibition of stage plays during the English Commonwealth era. The three Davenant works were important in the evolution of English opera and musical theatre, and heralded the coming revival of drama with the Restoration of 1660.

== History and propaganda ==
Like The Cruelty, Davenant's Drake was not only tolerated but even encouraged by Lord Protector Oliver Cromwell, for its value as anti-Spanish propaganda. (The English had been at war with Spain since 1655.) Davenant exploited Drake as an English national hero and a symbol of an expansionist foreign policy. He drew his narrative materials from Philip Nichols's Sir Francis Drake Revived (1626; reprinted 1652).

Davenant's text deals with Drake's adventures on the northeastern coast of South America during his expedition of 1572. At one point, Davenant shows Drake allying himself with the "Symerons" or Cimaroons, escaped slaves of Surinam who had formed their own independent society. (Though Davenant's Drake has been classified as "pseudo-history," this part of the story is based on fact — though Davenant displaces the Cimaroons to Peru.) As in The Cruelty, the English in Drake are presented as a humane alternative to the brutal and rapacious Spanish.

== Music ==
Only one piece of music from the score of Drake has survived — a "Symeron" dance composed by Matthew Locke. Locke was one of the composers who worked on The Siege of Rhodes, and perhaps on The Cruelty too.
