= Henry Lawes =

English musician and composer

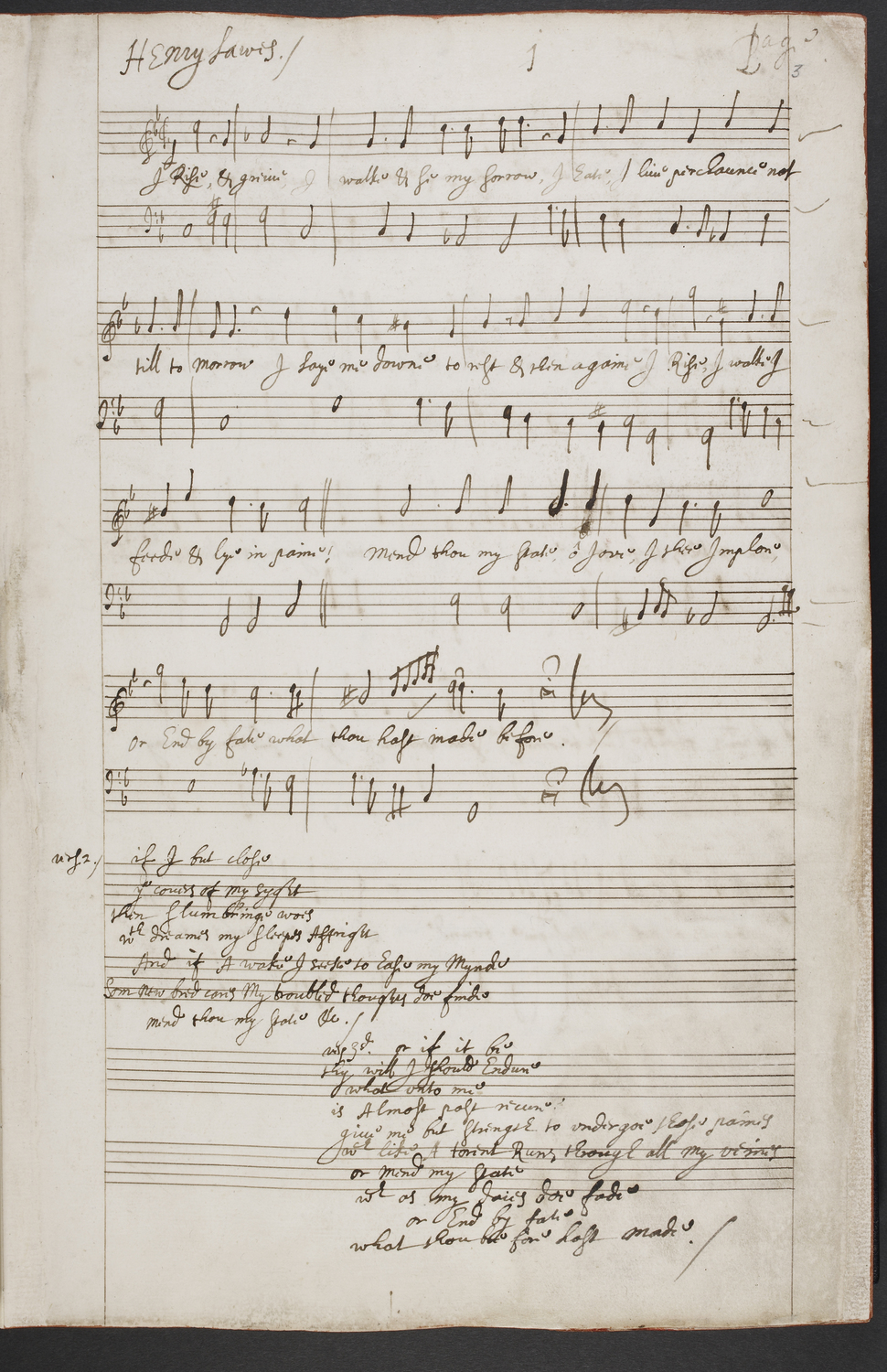
Manuscript of "I Rise and Grieve", in Lawes's hand (Note: This page presumably via book by Willetts)

Henry Lawes (baptised 5 January 1596 – 21 October 1662) was an English musician and composer, considered the leading English songwriter of the mid-17th century. He was the elder brother of fellow composer William Lawes.

== Life ==
Lawes was the elder son of Thomas Lawes and Lucris Lawes (born Shephard). (Note: Highfill et al. do not give authority for this.) He was born at Dinton, near Wilton, Wiltshire, just before 5 January 1596. Around 1602 Thomas, a church musician, moved to Salisbury as lay vicar and the family took up residence in the Close. Henry's three brothers, born in Salisbury, were also able musicians: William, Thomas (1608–1666) and John (d. 1655). It is presumed that Henry, and subsequently William, sang in the Cathedral choir, but there is no direct evidence. Nor is there information about his upbringing or musical training before he appeared in London, probably about 1615.

At an early stage in London he was employed by John Egerton, Earl of Bridgewater, to teach music to his daughters. He was sworn 'epistoler' of the Chapel Royal in January 1625/6 and Gentleman in November following. On 6 January 1630/1 he was cited in the Lord Chamberlain's accounts as being appointed 'for the lutes and voice' as one of Charles I's musicians, replacing the recently deceased Robert Marsh. By 28 February he was receiving an annual salary of £20, with a livery allowance of £16 2s 6d. Lawes was one of six countertenors of the Chapel Royal who attended the King at his coronation in Scotland in 1633). That same year he served as the Clerk of the Cheque of the Chapel Royal and was a member of the royal band.

During the mid-1630s he composed songs for Milton's Arcades and arranged for John Milton to write the masque Comus; its first performance on 29 September 1634 at Ludlow Castle marked the appointment of Bridgewater as President of the Council of Wales. Compositions for masques and other entertainments followed in the 1630s, sometimes with brother William and others such as Simon Ives. Unlike his songs (see below), little of his music for the masques survives. The portrait now in the Faculty of Music, Oxford University, is dated around this time, approximately 1642.

The English Civil War altered this way of life and affected Henry especially when William was killed in 1645, joining what was believed to be a victorious rout in the fighting at the siege of Chester. In 1648 Henry published Choice Psalms containing three-part psalms by himself and William as a memorial to William. It includes verse memorials by Townshend, Harington, Milton and Sambrooke, (Note: Francis Sambrooke, a friend who was solicitor in Salisbury.) with musical elegies by Henry Lawes, John Wilson, John Taylor, John Cobb, Edmond Foster, John Jenkins and John Hilton.

Whereas William had continued in the King's service, Henry developed his activities as teacher and performer. He taught the daughter of Sir Edward Dering, Lady Mary, to whom he later dedicated his 1655 collection of airs. He appears to have opened his house for music - the duchess of Newcastle attended "several times". Playford listed Henry in 1651 as among the London teachers "for the Voyce or Viol". In the later Commonwealth musical entertainments revived and Henry contributed to entertainments written by William Davenant such as his First Day's Entertainment performed at Rutland House on 23 May 1656.

With the publication of his second book of Ayres and Dialogues from 1655, Lawes reflected on his life's changes wrought by the Civil War: "... although I have lost my fortunes with my Master (of ever blessed memory) [the reference is to Charles I], I am not so low to bow for a subsistence to the follies of this age."

At the Restoration Lawes was reinstated in both of his old positions in the King's Musick (16 June, as Composer in the Private Musick " in place of Thomas Ford) and the Chapel Royal. On 23 April 1661 Henry Lawes's anthem Zadok the priest was sung at the coronation of Charles II. However it had been noted by William Child and Samuel Pepys among others that he lies very sick: he died on 21 October 1662 and was buried in the cloisters of Westminster Abbey on 25 October.

== Works ==
Henry Lawes wrote little instrumental music though some may have been lost: and though some of his 1638 psalm tunes are found in modern hymn-books, his devotional music does not now appeal. It is his output of more than 430 songs on which his reputation rests, linking the period of Dowland to that of Purcell. The major quantity of songs survive in manuscript, most especially an autograph collection, (Note: See Willetts, Pamela J, The Henry Lawes Manuscript, 1969, ISBN 0714104558.) thought to be in chronological order between 1620 and 1650, containing 325 songs. Another substantial manuscript source is in New York. The favoured poets were Carew, Waller, Herrick, Suckling and Lovelace.

Printed sources have some degree of overlap with the manuscripts but account for a further 239 songs: 1638: Psalms to paraphrase by George Sandys; 1648: Choice Psalms (see above); 1653: First Booke of Ayres and Dialogues; 1655: Second Booke of Ayres and Dialogues; 1658: Third Booke of Ayres and Dialogues;

In addition there are many songs and catches in publications by John Playford from 1652 ("Catch that Catch Can") through to 1678.
