= The Tempest (Dryden and D'Avenant play) =

Restoration comedy by Dryden and D'Avenant

The Tempest, or The Enchanted Island is a comedy adapted by John Dryden and William D'Avenant from Shakespeare's comedy The Tempest. The musical setting, previously attributed to Henry Purcell, and probably for the London revival of 1712, was very probably by John Weldon.

The Dryden–D’Avenant adaptation premiered at the Duke's Theatre in Lincoln's Inn Fields, London, on 7 November 1667, and published in 1670. It is written partly in blank verse and partly in a sort of rhythmic prose. The play was revised and revived a number of times, and adapted as an opera by Thomas Shadwell in April 1674; Shadwell's revision had a musical score created by a team of composers that included Matthew Locke and Pelham Humfrey. This was the version of The Tempest most familiar to audiences up until William Macready's enormously successful production of Shakespeare's original on 13 October 1838. Shadwell's version was revived in 1701, in 1702 through 1704, in 1706 through 1708, in 1710, in 1712 through 1717, and more than 20 times between 1729 and 1747.

Dryden and D'Avenant keep a great deal of Shakespeare's verse, but generally tone the play down, simplifying grammar and language occasionally, removing much of the "mythic resonance" of the original, and adding a fair amount of their own invention. The added elements include new characters – Hippolito, a man who has never seen a woman, and Dorinda, a second daughter of Prospero. Hippolito and Dorinda, predictably, fall in love; their love parallels that between Miranda, Shakespeare's maiden who has never seen a man, and Ferdinand, son to the Duke of Mantua (or to the King of Naples in Shakespeare's version). Ariel is given an ethereal girlfriend in Milcha (Shadwell expanded her role in 1674). Even Caliban gets a sister.

Shadwell's 1674 operatic version of Dryden and D'Avenant's adaptation was mocked by Thomas Duffet in his farce The Mock Tempest, or the Enchanted Castle, also in 1674.
