= William Davenant =

English poet and playwright (1606–1668)

Sir William Davenant
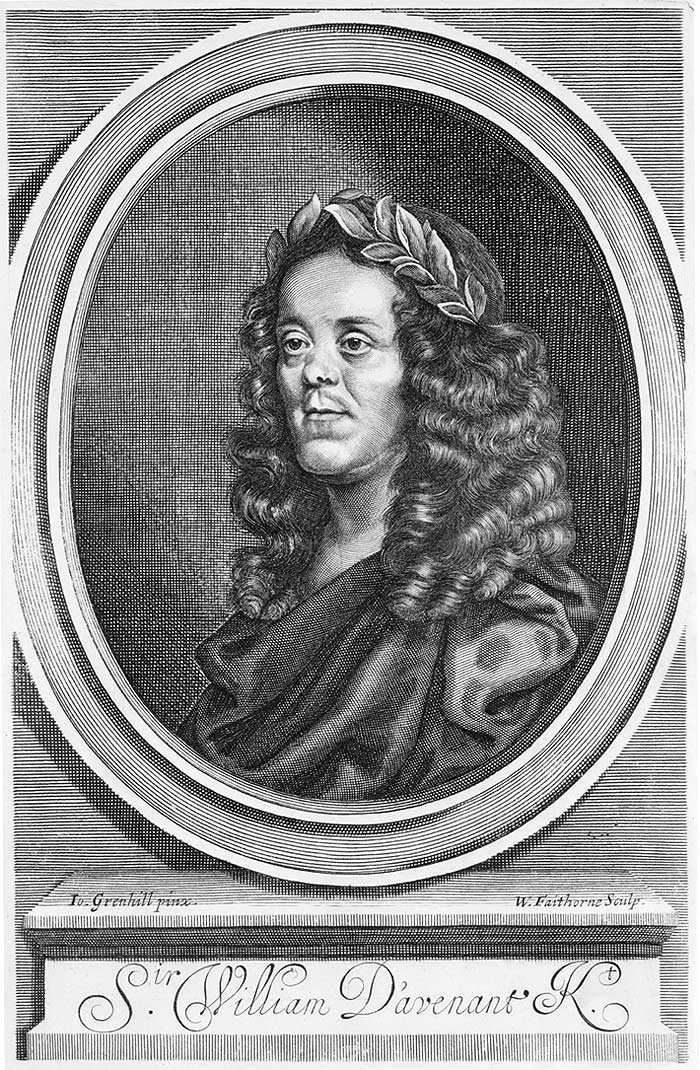
- Title page engraving of Davenant from his collected works, after a portrait by John Greenhill
- Born: 1606; Oxford, England
- Died: 7 April 1668 (aged 62); London, England
- Occupations: Playwright, poet, soldier
- Writing career
- Period: Stuart period; Restoration era

Sir William Davenant (baptised 3 March 1606 – 7 April 1668), also spelled D'Avenant, was an English poet and playwright. Along with Thomas Killigrew, Davenant was one of the rare figures in English Renaissance theatre whose career spanned both the Caroline and Restoration eras and who was active both before and after the English Civil War and during the Interregnum.

Davenant was reportedly a godson of fellow playwright William Shakespeare, and he wrote a memorial ode for his godfather when he was only twelve years old. Later in life, he was rumoured to be Shakespeare's illegitimate son. In 1638, Davenant replaced Ben Jonson as the new Poet Laureate. Davenant was a Royalist in the English Civil War and was sentenced to death by the Parliamentarians in 1650. His life was reportedly spared by the intervention of a fellow writer, John Milton.

== Biography ==
=== Early life ===
Davenant is believed to have been born in late February, 1606 in Oxford, the son of Jane Shepherd Davenant and John Davenant, proprietor of the Crown Tavern (or Crown Inn) and Mayor of Oxford. He was baptised on 3 March, his godfather sometimes being said to have been William Shakespeare, who, according to John Aubrey, had stayed frequently at the Crown during his travels between London and Stratford-upon-Avon. It was even rumoured that he was the Bard's biological son as well. This story was recorded by Aubrey from a comment attributed to Davenant by Samuel Butler:

Mr. William Shakespeare was wont to go into Warwickshire once a year, and did commonly in his journey lie at this house [the Crown] in Oxon, where he was exceedingly respected... Now Sir William [Davenant] would sometimes, when he was pleasant over a glass of wine with his most intimate friends--e.g. Sam Butler, author of Hudibras, etc., say, that it seemed to him that he writ with the very spirit that did Shakespeare, and seemed contented enough to be thought his Son. He would tell them the story as above, in which way his mother had a very light report, whereby she was called a Whore.

It has been suggested that Davenant simply meant that he saw himself as a literary son of Shakespeare, in the same way that followers of Ben Jonson called themselves the "Sons of Ben". However, according to Samuel Schoenbaum, since Aubrey's comment was unpublished, the existence of some other sources saying the same thing suggests that the story that "Sir William was more than Shakespeare's mere poetical offspring was common in Davenant's lifetime." In 1618, after Shakespeare's death, the 12-year-old Davenant wrote an ode "In Remembrance of Master Shakespeare".

He attended Lincoln College, Oxford, for a while in about 1620, but left before gaining any degree, becoming a page to the Duchess of Richmond. In London in 1630, he contracted a venereal disease, and was given a syphilis treatment by Thomas Cademan. As a convalescent, he left for the country in 1632 for a time. The syphilis severely disfigured his nose, resulting in damage that is discreetly depicted in John Greenhill's portrait. His ruined nose was the subject of much ribald comment by his enemies.

=== Poet laureate and Civil War ===
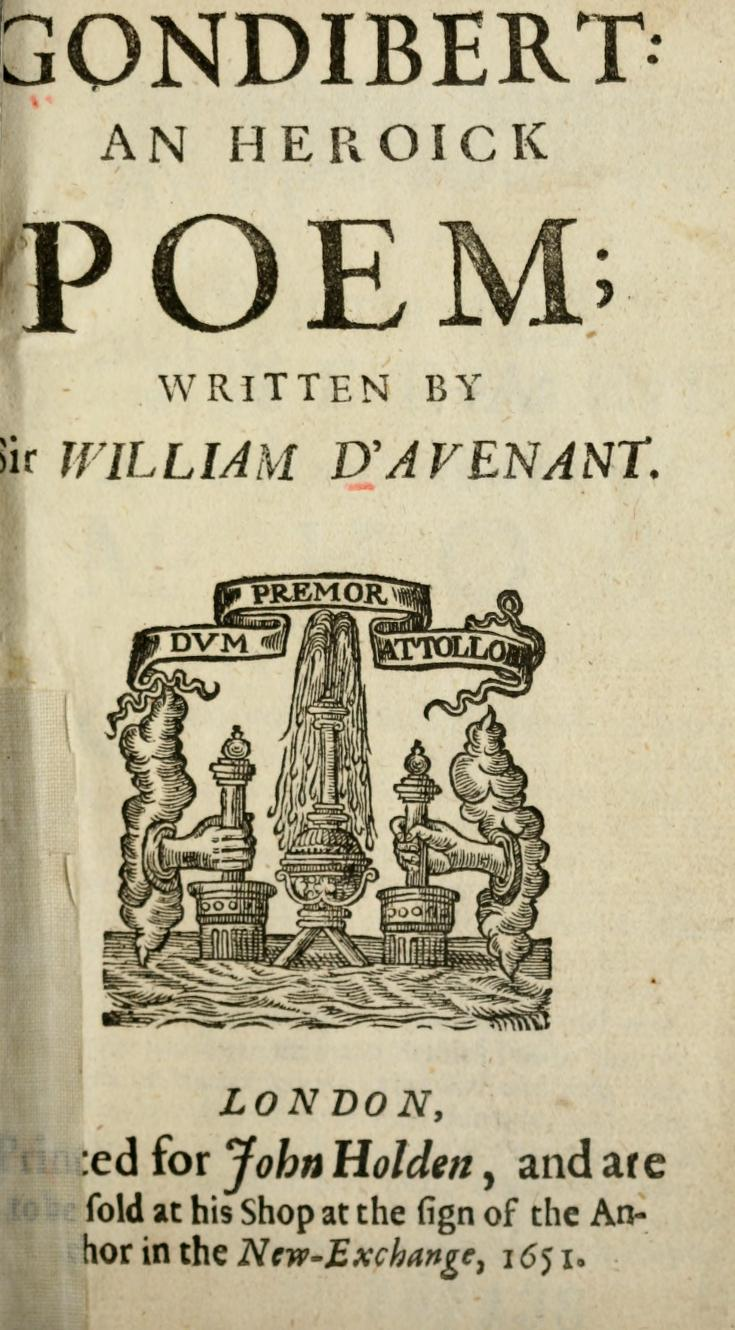
The title page of the 1651 edition of Gondibert

Following the death of Ben Jonson in 1637, Davenant was named Poet Laureate in 1638. He was a supporter of King Charles I in the English Civil War. In 1641, before the war began, he was declared guilty of high treason by parliament along with John Suckling, after he participated in the First Army Plot, a Royalist plan to use the army to occupy London. He fled to France. Returning to join the king's army when the war started, he was knighted two years later by king Charles following the siege of Gloucester.

In 1645, after the Royalist defeat at the Battle of Naseby, he retired to Paris, where he became a Roman Catholic and worked on his epic poem Gondibert. That same year he was appointed Emissary to France, and in 1649 was given the symbolic post of treasurer of the colony of Virginia by the exiled Charles II. The following year, he was made lieutenant governor of Maryland, but was captured at sea, imprisoned, and sentenced to death. In July, 1650, he was put on trial for his life, along with others in front of the newly established High Court of Justice. He is said to have been saved by the intervention of John Milton. He spent all of 1651 in the Tower of London, where he continued writing Gondibert.

On his release in 1652, he immediately published Gondibert, but he was only pardoned in 1654. In order to avoid the strict laws of censorship in force in all public places at the time, he turned a room of his home, Rutland House, into a private theatre where his works, and those of other writers considered seditious, could be performed. A performance of his The Siege of Rhodes at Rutland House in 1656 is considered to be the first performance of an English opera, and also included England's first known professional actress, Mrs Coleman. (Note: This was Catherine Coleman, wife of counter-tenor, composer and Gentleman of the Chapel Royal Edward Coleman.)

=== Restoration ===
Davenant once again found himself in legal trouble in 1659, when he was imprisoned for his part in Sir George Booth's uprising in Cheshire after the death of Cromwell. He was, however, released the same year, and left once more for France. When Charles II was restored to the throne, Davenant returned to England. The Restoration also led to the re-opening of theatres, which had been closed due to the influence of the puritans under Cromwell. In 1660, he is publicly recorded as being one of the two theatrical patentees, along with Thomas Killigrew, who obtained a monopoly of public theatre performances.

He headed the Duke of York's Men and produced highly successful theatrical seasons at Lincoln's Inn Fields from 1660 until his death in 1668. Among his more successful productions were some Shakespeare plays, including: Hamlet, Henry VIII, and Macbeth, as well as non-Shakespeare plays such as Sir Samuel Tuke's The Adventure of Five Hours and John Dryden's comedy Sir Martin Marall. He had returned to England sometime before the initial production of his adaptation of Shakespeare's The Tempest, written with John Dryden, who would be named the next (and first officially by letters patent) Poet Laureate.

He died in London on 7 April 1668, shortly after his final play, The Man's the Master, was first performed. He is buried in Poets' Corner at Westminster Abbey where the inscription on his tablet reads "O rare Sir William Davenant". It has been noted that the original inscription on Ben Jonson's tablet, which was already removed by the time Davenant died, was "O Rare Ben", which was the name Shakespeare supposedly had for Jonson. "O Rare" is a play on the Latin orare, to pray.

Nine of his works, though they were previously licensed or produced in London during his life as were all of his plays, were finally published in print posthumously. Several of these were included in The Works of Sr William D'avenant Kt., by Henry Herringman in 1673, which was copied from Davenant's own originals.

== Works ==
=== Epic poems and books of poetry ===
- 1630: Ieffereidos
- 1638: Madagascar, with other Poems
- 1648: London, King Charles his Augusta, or, City Royal, of the founders, the names, and oldest honours of that City
- 1650: A Discourse upon Gondibert, an heroick poem (or simply Gondibert), originally published unfinished, then published again in 1651 in its final form and included Davenant's "Preface to his most honour’d friend Mr. Hobs" and "The Answer of Mr. Hobbes to Sir William D’Avenant’s Preface before Gondibert" by Thomas Hobbes, to whom the book was dedicated; the official second edition in 1653 also contained "Certain Verses, written by severall of the author’s friends"
- 1656: Wit and Drollery: Jovial Poems
- 1657: Poems on Several Occasions

=== Panegyrics ===
- 1660: "A Panegyric to his Excellency the Lord General Monck", to George Monck
- 1660: "Poem, Upon His Sacred Majesties Most Happy Return to His Dominions", on the Restoration of Charles II
- 1663: "Poem, to the King’s most sacred Majesty", to Charles II

=== Original plays, masques and operas ===
Listed in chronological order.

- Albovine, King of the Lombards, tragedy (ca. 1626–9; printed 1629)
- The Cruel Brother, tragedy (licensed 12 January 1627; printed 1630)
- The Just Italian, comedy (licensed 2 October 1629; printed 1630)
- The Wits, comedy (licensed 19 January 1634; printed 1636)
- Love and Honour, tragicomedy, also previously performed as The Courage of Love; and The Nonpareilles, or The Matchless Maids (licensed 20 November 1634: printed 1649)
- The Temple of Love, masque (licensed 10 February 1635; printed 1635)
- News from Plymouth, comedy (licensed 1 August 1635; printed 1673)
- The Platonick Lovers, comedy (licensed 16 November 1635; printed 1636)
- The Triumphs of the Prince D'Amour, masque (performed 23 or 24 February 1636; printed 1636)
- Britannia Triumphans, masque, with Inigo Jones (licensed 8 January 1638; printed 1638)
- Luminalia or The Festival of Light, masque, with Inigo Jones (licensed 6 February 1638; printed 1638)
- The Unfortunate Lovers, tragedy (licensed 16 April 1638; printed 1643)
- The Fair Favourite, tragicomedy (licensed 17 November 1638; printed 1673)
- The Spanish Lovers, or The Distresses, comedy (licensed 30 March 1639; printed 1673)
- Salmacida Spolia, masque (performed 21 January 1640; printed 1640)
- The Siege of Rhodes, Part I, tragicomedy (performed September 1656; printed 1656)
- The Cruelty of the Spaniards in Peru, opera (performed and printed 1658)
- The History of Sir Francis Drake, history (performed 1658–9; printed1659)
- The Siege of Rhodes, Part II, tragicomedy (ca. 1657–9; printed 1663)
- The Playhouse to Be Let, comedy (performed ca. August 1663; printed 1673); includes Sir Frances Drake and The Cruelty of the Spaniards in Peru
- The Man's the Master, comedy (performed 26 March 1668; printed 1669)

=== Revisions, adaptations and other productions for the stage ===
- The First Day's Entertainment at Rutland House, a "disputation" (performed 23 May 1656; printed 1657)
- The Law Against Lovers (performed 10 February 1662, printed 1673), a version of Measure for Measure mixed with Much Ado About Nothing
- Macbeth (performed 5 November 1664; printed 1674), an operatic adaptation of Shakespeare's Macbeth
- Greene's Tu Quoque (performed 12 September 1667; lost), based upon the 1614 edition of John Cooke's Greene's Tu Quoque Or, the Cittie Gallant, which had been made famous by the actor Thomas Greene's 1611 performance
- The Tempest, or The Enchanted Island (performed 7 November 1667, printed 1670), an adaptation with John Dryden of Shakespeare's The Tempest
- The Rivals (c. 1664; printed 1668), a revision of The Two Noble Kinsmen
- Hamlet
- Julius Caesar with John Dryden

== Notes ==
Court offices
Preceded by Ben Jonson	English Poet Laureate; 1638–1668	Succeeded by John Dryden
