= Dryden (surname) =

Dryden is an English surname which derives from the Welsh word drwydwn, meaning a 'broken nose'. For other uses, including fictional names, see Dryden (disambiguation).

Notable people with the surname include:

== John Dryden ==
- John Dryden (1631–1700), English poet
- John C. Dryden (1893–1952), politician
- John Dryden (footballer), New Zealand international football (soccer) player
- John Dryden (Ontario politician) (1840–1909), farmer and politician
- John Dryden (Kuser) (1897–1964), New Jersey politician
- John F. Dryden (1839–1911), businessman

== Other people named Dryden ==
- Alice Dryden, English photographer and historian
- Charles Dryden (1860–1931), American baseball writer and humorist
- Charles Dryden (disambiguation), several people
- Dan Dryden (1944–2016), American politician
- Dave Dryden, retired Canadian ice hockey goaltender
- David Owen Dryden, San Diego builder-architect
- Helen Dryden, American artist and designer
- Hugh Latimer Dryden, NASA Deputy Director
- Jim Dryden, New Zealand wrestler
- Ken Dryden (1947–2025), Canadian ice hockey player, author, and politician
- Konrad Dryden (born 1963), American writer on Italian opera, descendant of John Dryden
- Murray Dryden, Canadian philanthropist
- Nathaniel Dryden (1849–1924), American architect
- Nicole Dryden, two-time Olympic swimmer from Canada
- OmiSoore Dryden, academic and researcher
- Richard Dryden, English former professional footballer and former manager of Worcester City F.C.
- Spencer Dryden, American musician who was best known as the drummer for Jefferson Airplane, New Riders of the Purple Sage and The Dinosaurs
- Wheeler Dryden, English actor and film director, father of rock musician Spencer Dryden (above), and half brother of Charlie Chaplin

== See also ==
- Dryden baronets
