= John Lovel =

John Lovel may refer to:

- John Lovel, 1st Baron Lovel, English noble
- John Lovel, 2nd Baron Lovel, English noble
