= Canons Ashby House =

Historic manor house in Canons Ashby, Northamptonshire, England

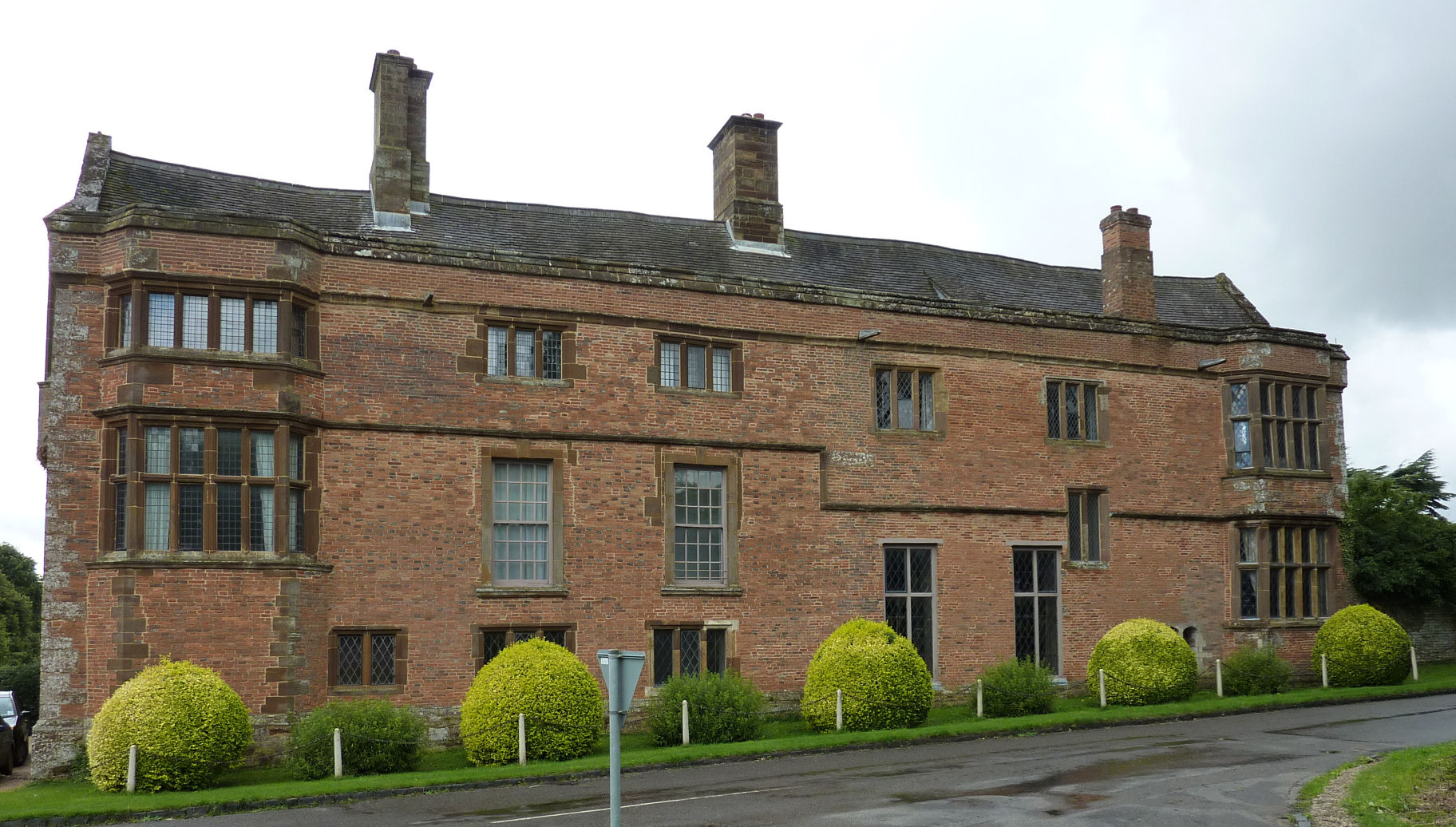
- Front of Canons Ashby House

- Location within Northamptonshire
- 52.151013°N 1.158176°W
- Location: Canons Ashby, Daventry, Northamptonshire, England, NN11 3SD

Site notes
- Architectural style: Elizabethan
- Governing body: National Trust

Listed Building – Grade I
- Official name: Canons Ashby House
- Designated: 18 September 1953
- Reference no.: 1075304

Canons Ashby House (previously known as Canons Ashby Hall) is a Grade I listed Elizabethan manor house located in the village of Canons Ashby, about 11 miles (17.7 km) south of the town of Daventry in the county of Northamptonshire, England. It has been owned by the National Trust since 1981 when the house was close to collapse and the gardens had turned into a meadow. "The Tower" of the building is in the care of the Landmark Trust and available for holiday lets.

== Design ==
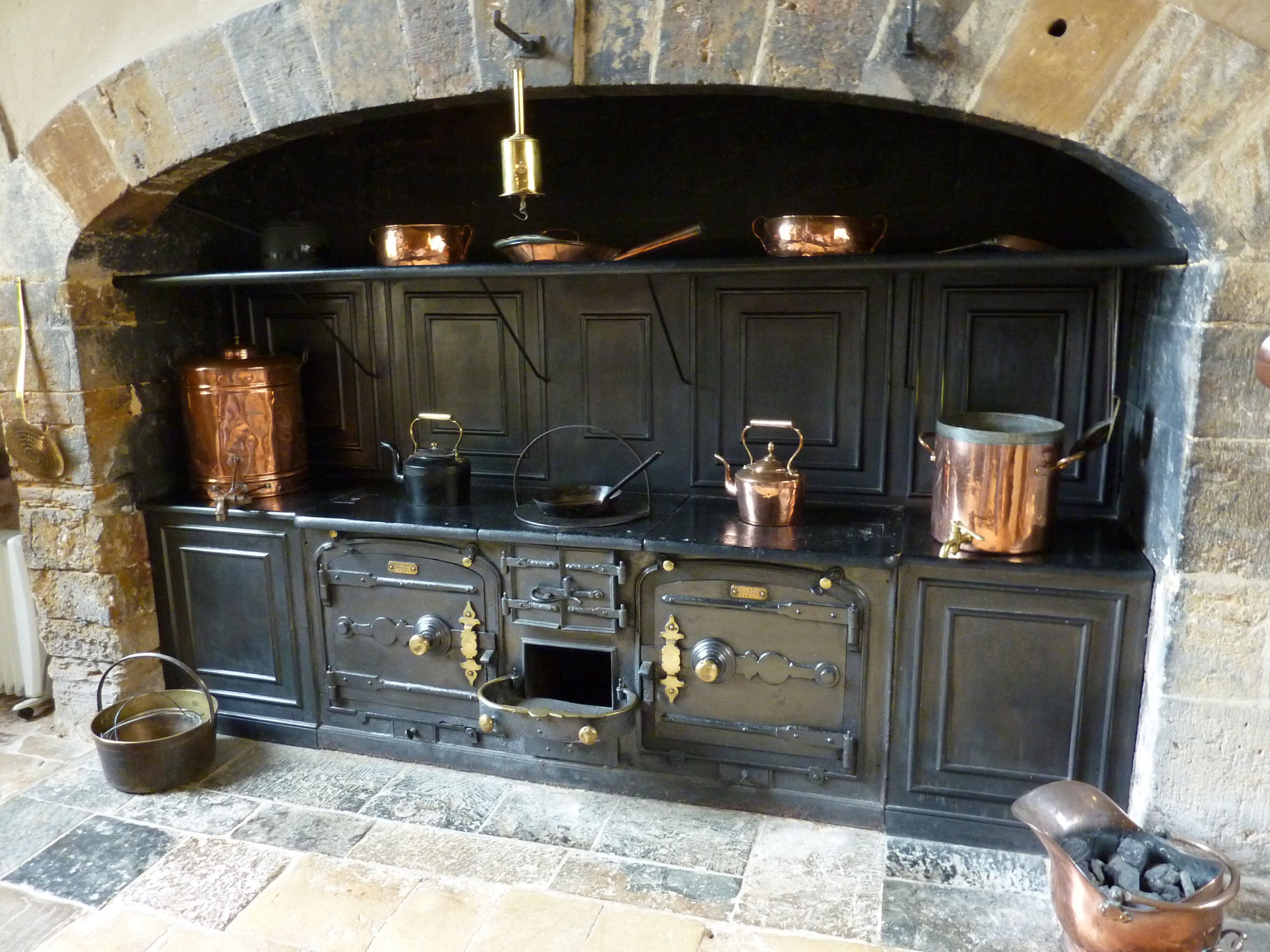
Kitchen range at Canons Ashby House

The interior of Canons Ashby House is noted for its Elizabethan wall paintings and its Jacobean plasterwork. It has remained essentially unchanged since 1710 and is presented as it was during the time of Sir Henry Edward Leigh Dryden (1818–1899), a Victorian antiquary with an interest in history.

The house sits in the midst of a formal garden with colourful herbaceous borders, an orchard featuring varieties of fruit trees from the 16th century, terraces, walls and gate piers from 1710. There is also the remains of a medieval priory church (from which the house gets its name).

== History ==
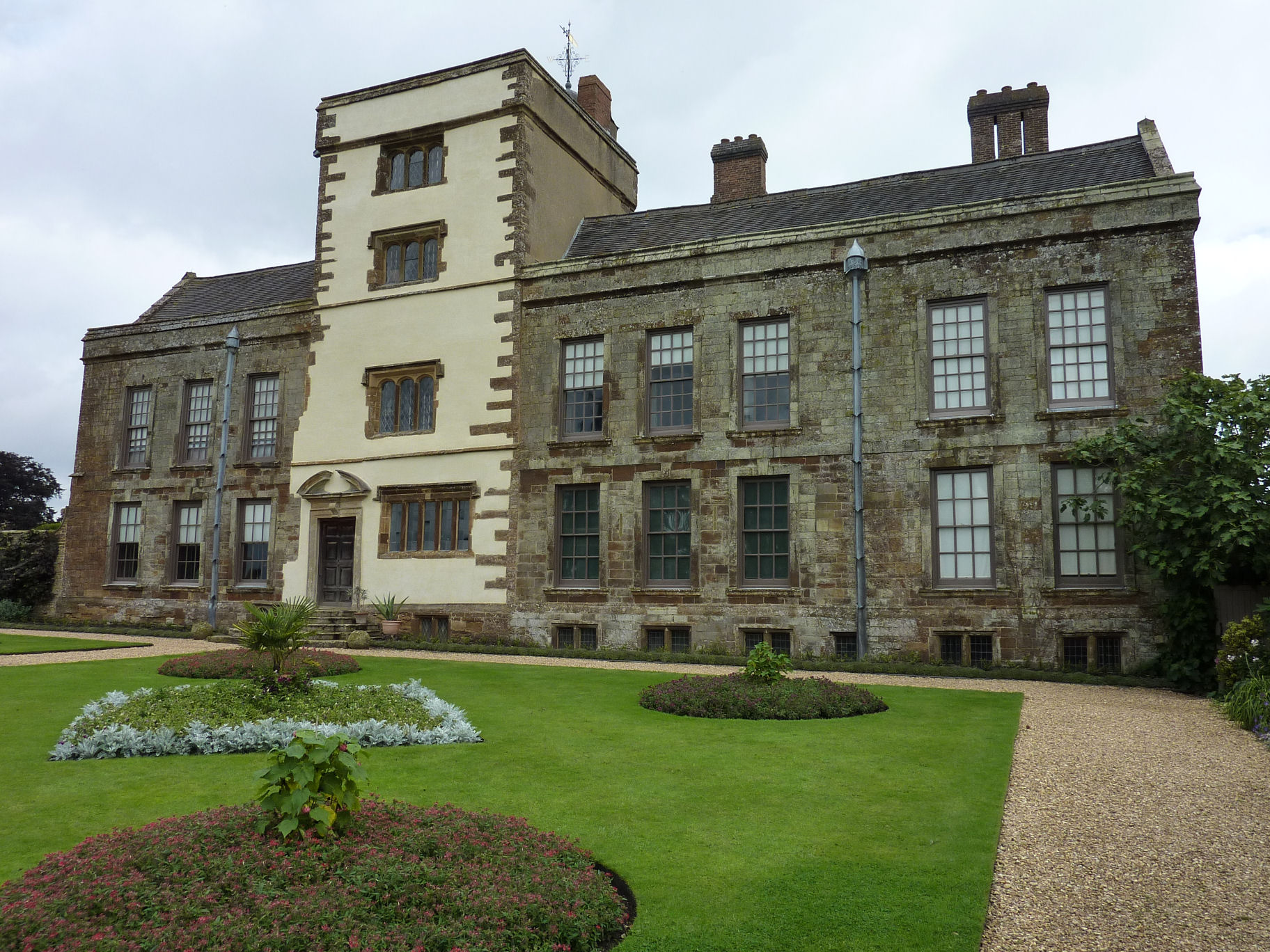
Rear of Canons Ashby House

The house was the home of the Dryden (Note: The poet John Dryden was a cousin to the family, as was Edmund Spenser.) family since its construction in the 16th century; the manor house was built in approximately 1550 with additions in the 1590s, in the 1630s and 1710.

One John Dryden had married Elizabeth Cope, daughter of Sir John Cope, in 1551 and inherited, through his wife, an L-shaped farmhouse which he gradually extended. John Dryden and Elizabeth Cope had a daughter, Bridget Dryden (1563–1645), born at Canons Ashby. She became the second wife of cleric and teacher Francis Marbury; their daughter Anne Hutchinson (1591–1643) emigrated to the Massachusetts Bay Colony in 1634. Anne's strong religious convictions were at odds with the established Puritan clergy in the Boston area, and her popularity and charisma helped create a theological schism that threatened to destroy the Puritans' religious community in New England. She was eventually tried and convicted, then banished from the colony with many of her supporters. To 19th century America, she was a crusader for religious liberty; in the 20th century, she became viewed as a feminist leader for her staunch defence of individual freedom of thought. Today, a statue of Anne Hutchinson stands in front of the State House in Boston, Massachusetts.

In the 1590s John's son, Sir Erasmus Dryden, 1st Baronet completed the final north range of the house which enclosed the Pebble Courtyard. He also acquired a baronetcy and added several decorative elements to the interior, including the chimneypiece in the drawing room and the murals in Spenser's room. His son Sir John Dryden, 2nd Baronet inherited in turn, and further decorated the drawing room with an elaborate plasterwork ceiling. A later descendent, Edward Dryden (son of the 6th baronet) turned his attention to the garden, creating a formal baroque garden across a series of terraces.

Sir Henry Edward Leigh Dryden inherited the house upon his father's death in 1837, and his efforts focused on the creation of the book room, which held the archives of the house as well as the county of Northamptonshire. His daughter, the historian and photographer Alice Dryden (1866–1956) was born in the house and lived there for 33 years, capturing a valuable visual record of the property. She moved away after her father died, since a woman could not inherit the estate and it went to her uncle, Sir Alfred Erasmus Dryden (1821–1912).

During World War II, the London offices of 20th Century Fox films were evacuated to Canons Ashby House; the evacuee staff lived in the nearby village of Moreton Pinkney. After the war, the family moved to Rhodesia and leased the house to a succession of tenants.

Louis Osman (1914–1996), an architect and accomplished British goldsmith lived at Canons Ashby from 1969/70 to 1979. Whilst there, Osman made the crown, with his enamellist wife, Dilys Roberts, which was used at the investiture of Charles, Prince of Wales in 1969. They also made the gold enamelled casket that held the Magna Carta which was on view in the United States Capitol, Washington, DC in 1976 for the United States Bicentennial.

Gervase Jackson-Stops, who was the Architectural Adviser to the National Trust for over twenty years, broke fresh ground when he fought for the rescue of the then decaying manor-house in the 1980s. This was the first time that the Trust used its charitable funds rather than the traditional family endowment to save a historic house.

== Interior ==
=== Great Hall ===
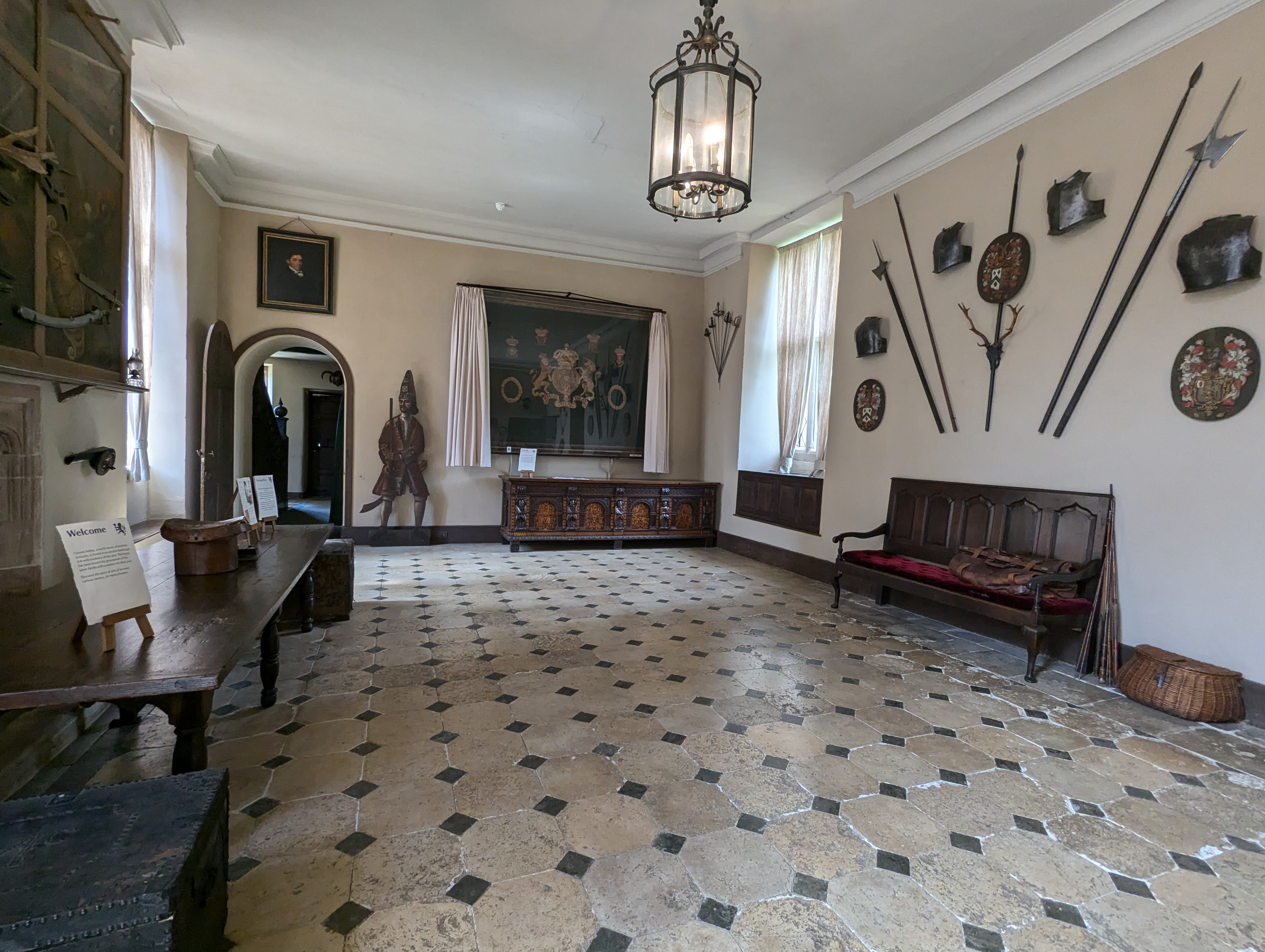
The Great Hall

This room was part of the original 1550s house build by John Dryden, then expanded in the 17th century. In the early 18th century, Edward Dryden restyled the room in medieval fashion with armour and heraldry, along with a martial overmantel painting by Elizabeth Creed, a cousin of the family. Creed also painted a dummy board of a Scots Guardsman which can be seen in the room. The room also contains a large green textile panel with the arms of William and Mary, which was associated with the Board of Green Cloth.

=== Dining room ===
This room was redecorated by Edward Dryden in 1710, who added sash windows and oak panelling. A series of family portraits line the walls, including the poet laureate John Dryden by Godfrey Kneller and Elizabeth Cornwallis (Edward's mother-in-law) as Diana by John Michael Wright. The bespoke walnut-framed mirror that hangs over the fireplace was installed at the same time as the panelling.

=== Book room ===
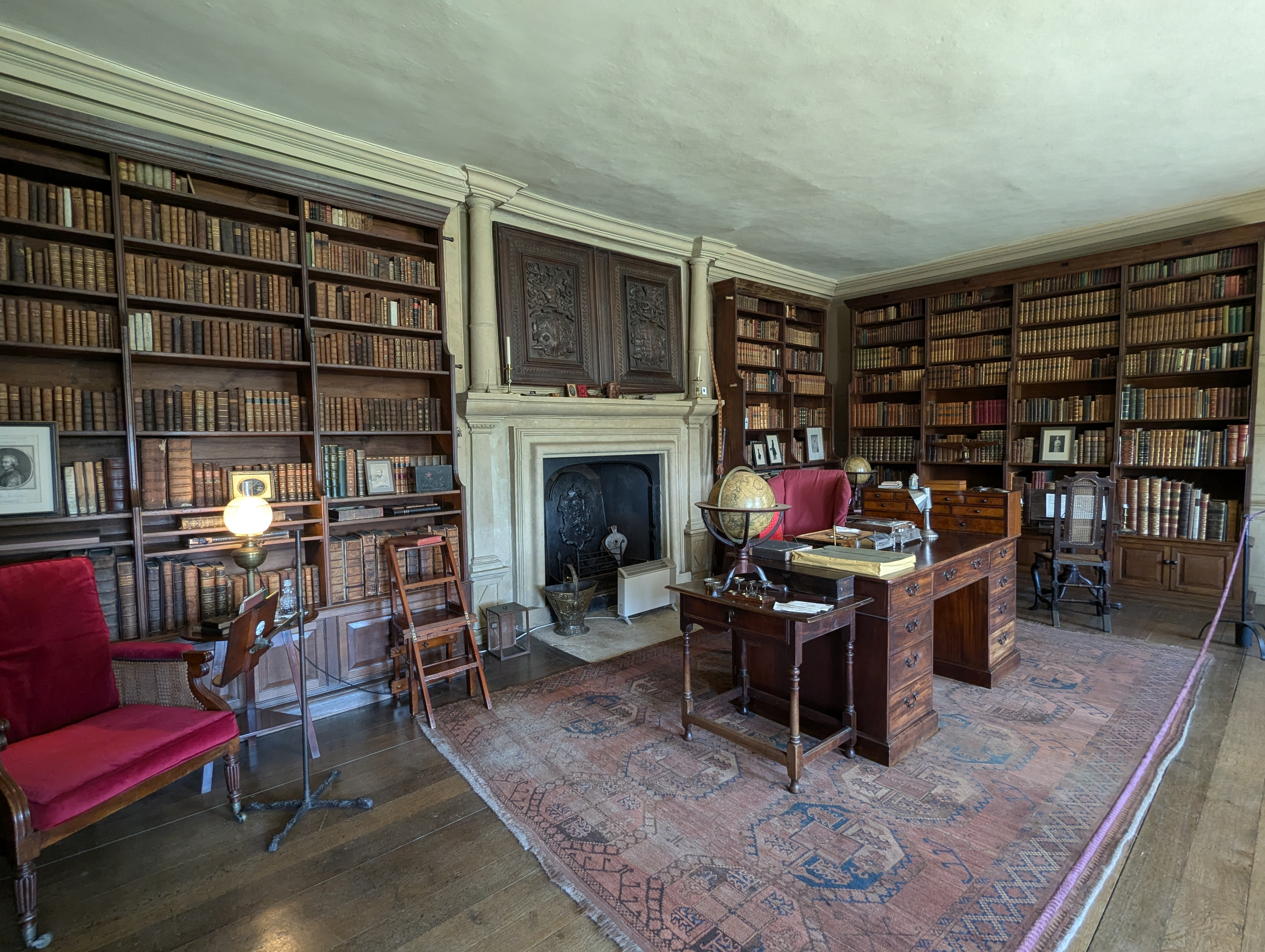
The Book Room

Sir Erasmus Dryden expanded the house in the 1590s, adding this room with its paneling and a chimneypiece with Doric columns. The overmantel panels refer to the marriage of Sir John Cope and Margaret Thame, possibly originating from the original Cope family home, Copes Ashby. Sir Henry Dryden (known as "the antiquarian") restyled this room in the mid 19th century as a place to read books, rather than as a library from which books are borrowed. Much of the original collection, which included a First Folio of Shakespeare, was sold at auction during the 20th century. However the National Trust has since reacquired many books associated with the house. A pastel self-portrait by Elizabeth Creed also hangs in this room. Creed also decorated the adjacent withdrawing room known as the Painted Parlour.

=== Drawing room ===
Part of the original Elizabethan house, the rich decoration of this room illustrates several campaigns of embellishment. The huge fireplace and overmantel were installed in the 1590s and painted to resemble marble. Sir John added the domed ceiling and the coat of arms above the chimneypiece upon inheriting in the 1630s. The panels installed above the mantel were added in 1710 by Edward Dryden illustrating the family arms. A series of watercolours by Clara Dryden, sister of Arthur (6th Bt.), portray scenes from Canons Ashby in the 1890s.

=== Spenser's Room ===
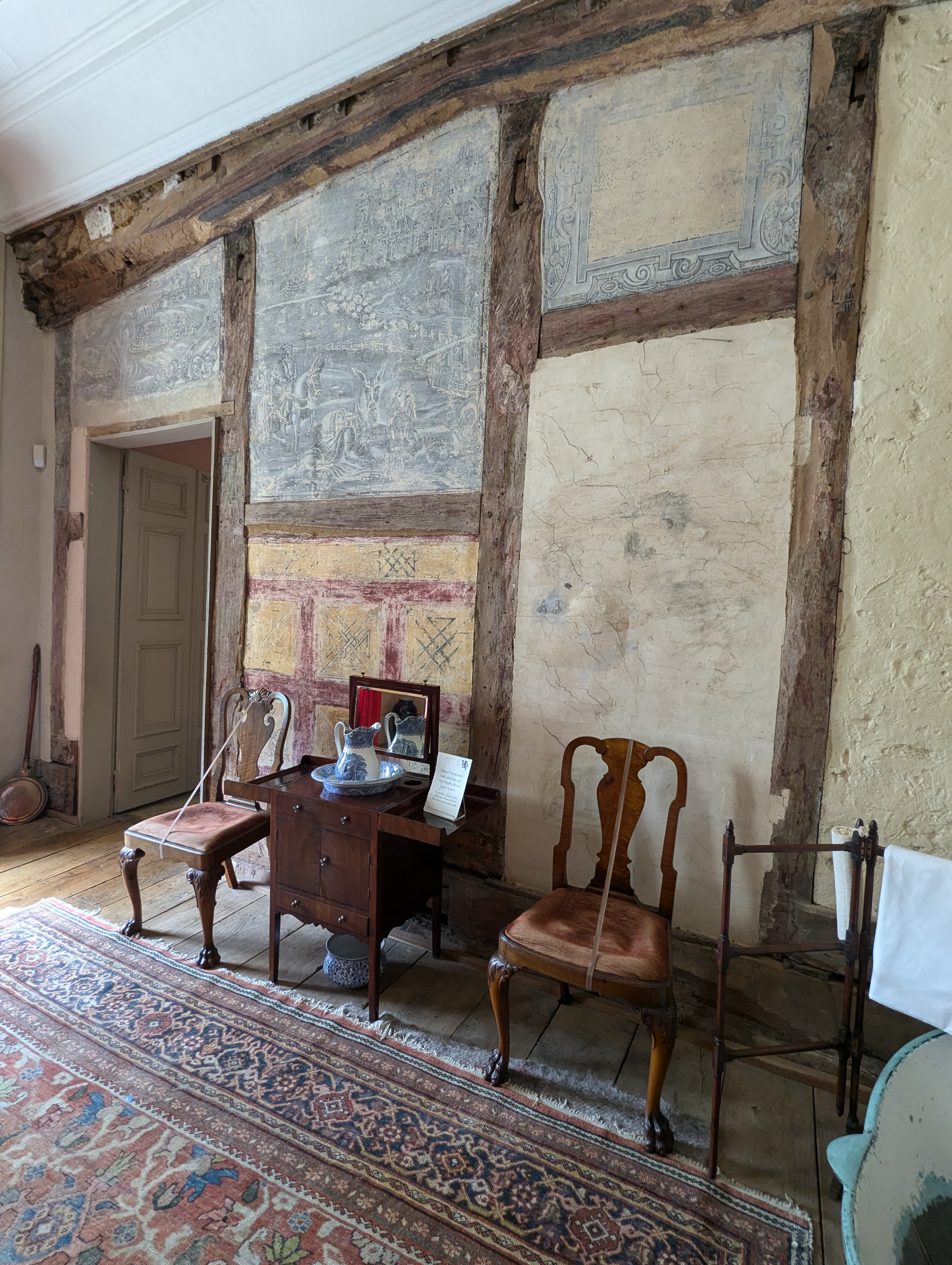
Elizabethan murals in Spenser's Room

This bedroom was named for the poet Edward Spenser, Sir Erasmus' cousin by marriage, who allegedly wrote part of The Faerie Queen during a visit. During the restoration of the house in the 20th century, a series of rare Elizabethan grisaille murals were discovered behind 18th century panelling. The well-preserved images represent the story of Jeroboam from the biblical Book of Kings, warning of the perils of venerating false gods.

=== Tapestry Room ===
The room originates from the 1560s, but was modified several times during its history. The Flemish tapestries which hang around the room date from the 17th century. The bed was created in the 19th century by Sir Henry and incorporates Jacobean carving. The room also features an early 18th century embroidered settee, produced for Edward Dryden by Thomas Phill; sold by the family between the wars, it was reacquired by the National Trust in 1983 through the support of an anonymous benefactor.

=== Servants' hall ===
Created in the 1580s, this room served as a private family dining room, separate from the more-formal dining space of the Great Hall. When Edward Dryden created his new dining room in 1710, this room was repurposed as a dining space for servants. Most notable are the painted panels in the room, added in the 1590s by Sir Erasmus, depicting coats of arms as well as a series of moral inscriptions in Latin. The crests represent a range of family connections as well as prominent nearby families.

== Sources ==
- Garnett, Oliver (2001). Canons Ashby : Northamptonshire. The National Trust. OCLC 50401290.
- Jackson-Stops, Gervase (1984). Canons Ashby. Northamptonshire. The National Trust. OCLC 1004579402.
- Jackson-Stops, Gervase (1985). "A Set of Furniture by Thomas Phill at Canons Ashby". Furniture History. 21: 217–219. ISSN 0016-3058. JSTOR 23406927.
- Mawrey, Gillian (2015). "Canons Ashby, Northamptonshire". Historic Gardens Review (32): 42–43. ISSN 1461-0191. JSTOR 44790109.
