= Elizabeth Creed =

British artist (1642–1728)

- Born: Elizabeth Pickering; 1642; Titchmarsh, Northamptonshire, England
- Died: 1728 (aged 85–86); Oundle, England
- Known for: Painting
- Spouse: John Creed

Elizabeth Creed (née Pickering; 1642–1728) was an English artist and philanthropist.

She was a daughter of Sir Gilbert Pickering, Bart., and Elizabeth Montagu, daughter of Sir Sidney Montagu. She was a cousin of the poet John Dryden, and a second cousin of Samuel Pepys.

In 1668 she married John Creed, of Oundle in Northamptonshire, and had eleven children. On his death in 1701 she occupied herself in painting as an amateur, and graciously instructing young girls in fine needlework and other feminine arts. Many churches in the neighbourhood of Oundle were decorated with altarpieces and various artistic adornments by her. Monuments by her survive at Barnwell and St Mary's Church, Titchmarsh.

After another cousin, Edward Dryden, inherited the estate of Canons Ashby in 1708, she was tasked with the painting of what was then called the Painted Parlour as well as a piece for the Great Hall and a set of dummy boards. At Drayton, in the collection of the Earls of Peterborough, was a portrait of the first Earl of Sandwich; and Mrs. Creed's descendants possessed many portraits and some pictures by her. She died in May 1728.

Samuel Pepys, who was not overly fond of her husband, admired Elizabeth: "very well-bred and comely", though inclined to be stout.
