= Dryden baronets of Canons Ashby (2nd creation, 1795) =

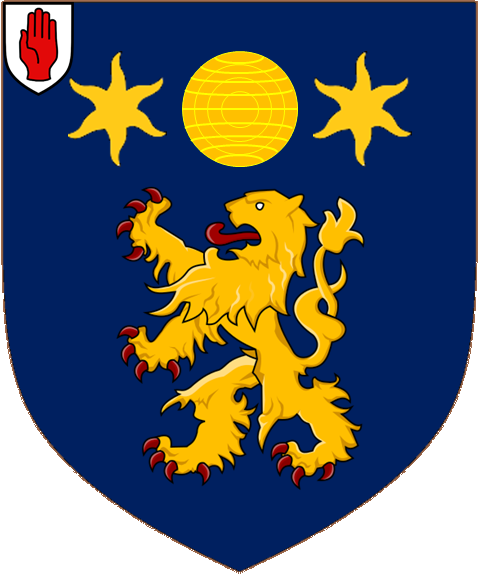
Escutcheon of the Dryden baronets of Canons Ashby

The Dryden baronetcy, of Canons Ashby in the County of Northampton, was created, secondly in the Baronetage of Great Britain, on 2 May 1795 for John Dryden. Born John Turner, he was the sixth son of the 2nd Baronet of the 1733 creation, and the husband of the niece and heiress of the 7th and last Baronet of the 1619 creation. In 1791 he took the surname Dryden. He was High Sheriff of Northamptonshire in 1793, and was knighted. In 1795 he raised a unit of Yeomanry Cavalry.

The 4th Baronet succeeded as 7th Baronet of the 1733 creation in 1874.

== Dryden baronets, of Canons Ashby (1795), to 1874 ==
- Sir John Dryden, 1st Baronet (1752–1797)
- Sir John Edmund Dryden, 2nd Baronet (1782–1818)
- Sir Henry Dryden, 3rd Baronet (1787–1837)
- Sir Henry Edward Leigh Dryden, 4th Baronet (1818–1899) (succeeded as 7th Baronet of Ambrosden in 1874)

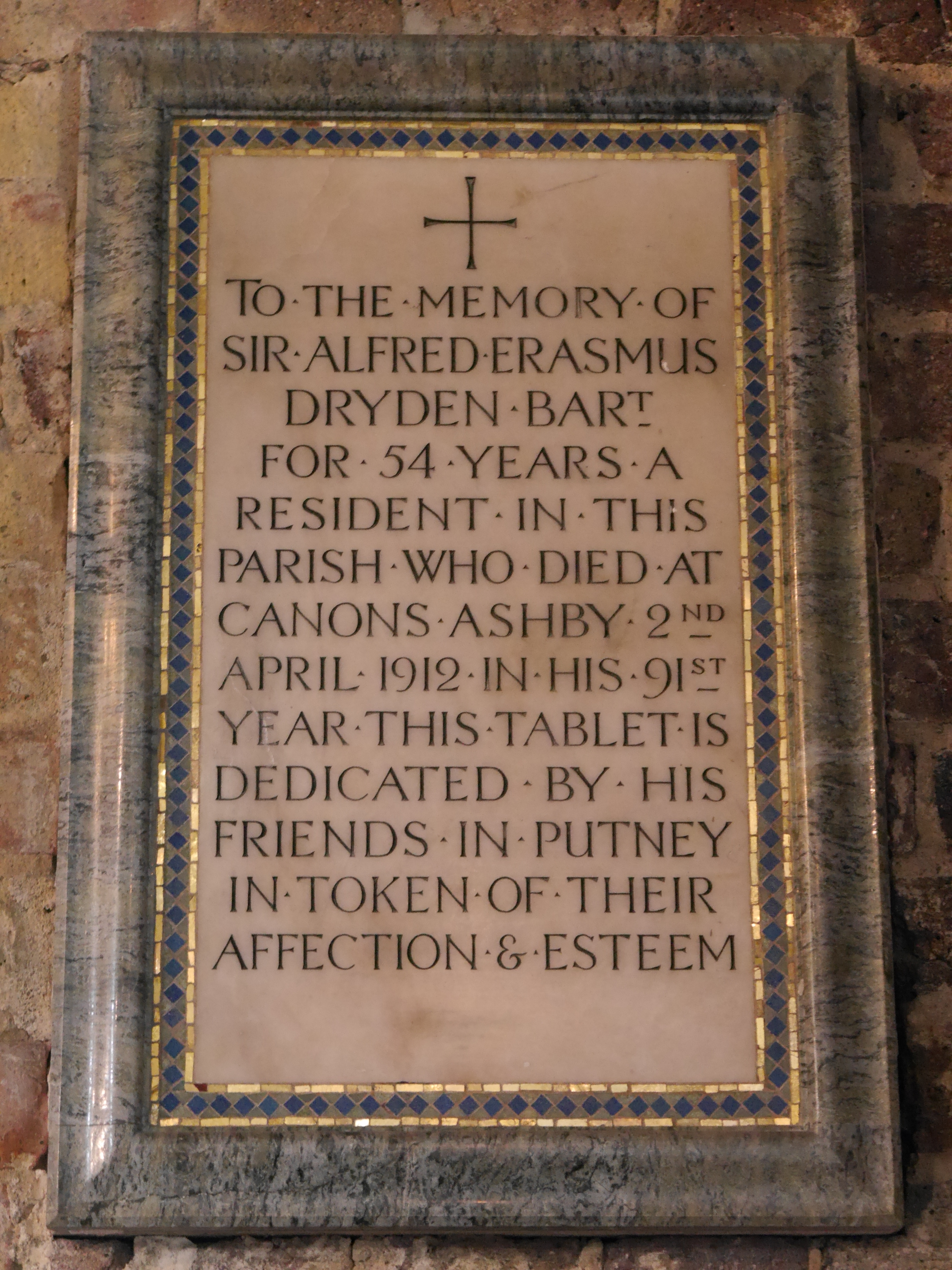
Sir Alfred Erasmus Dryden memorial, St Mary's, Putney, London

== Dryden baronets, of Canons Ashby and of Ambrosden, from 1874 ==
Unified listing of for the two baronetcies.

- Sir Henry Edward Leigh Dryden, 4th and 7th Baronet (1818–1899)
- Sir Alfred Erasmus Dryden, 5th and 8th Baronet (1822–1912)
- Sir Arthur Dryden, 6th and 9th Baronet (1852–1938)
- Sir Noel Percy Hugh Dryden, 7th and 10th Baronet (1910–1970)
- Sir John Stephen Gyles Dryden, 8th and 11th Baronet (1943–2022)
- Sir John Frederick Simon Dryden, 9th and 12th Baronet (born 1976)

The heir apparent is the current holder's son William Frederick David John Dryden (born 2012).

== Notes ==
Baronetage of Great Britain
Preceded by Chetwynd baronets	Dryden baronets of Canons Ashby; 2 May 1795	Succeeded by Salusbury baronets
