= Charles Dryden (disambiguation) =

Charles Dryden (1860–1931) was an American baseball writer and humorist.

Charles Dryden may also refer to:

- Charles Dryden (English writer) (1666–1704), son of English poet John Dryden, chamberlain to Pope Innocent XII
- Charles W. Dryden (1920–2008), U.S. Army Air Corps airman
- Charles Dryden (cricketer) (1860–1943), New Zealand cricketer
