= John Creed =

John Creed may refer to:

- John Creed FRS (British naval administrator) (d.1701), secretary to Edward Montagu, 1st Earl of Sandwich
- John Creed (politician) (1842–1930), Australian doctor and politician
- John Creed (soldier) (1819–1872), Irish-American soldier
- John Creed (author), pseudonym of Eoin McNamee (born 1961), Irish writer
