= Sir Alfred Dryden, 5th and 8th Baronet =

English cricketer and barrister

Personal information
- Full name: Alfred Erasmus Dryden
- Born: 14 October 1821; Adlestrop, Gloucestershire, England
- Died: 2 April 1912 (aged 90); Canons Ashby, Northamptonshire, England
- Batting: Unknown

Domestic team information
- Years: Team
- 1841–1842: Oxford University

Career statistics
Competition	First-class
Matches	7
Runs scored	145
Batting average	10.35
100s/50s	–/–
Top score	29
Catches/stumpings	7/–
- Source: Cricinfo, 31 May 2020

Sir Alfred Erasmus Dryden, 5th and 8th Baronet (14 October 1821 – 2 April 1912) was an English first-class cricketer and barrister.

The son of Sir Henry Dryden, he was born at in October 1821 at Adlestrop, Gloucestershire. He was educated at Winchester College, before going up to Trinity College, Oxford. While studying at Oxford, he played first-class cricket for Oxford University, making his debut against the Marylebone Cricket Club at Oxford in 1841. He played first-class cricket for Oxford until 1843, making seven appearances. Dryden scored 145 runs in his seven first-class matches, at an average of 10.35 and with a high score of 29.

A student of the Middle Temple, he was called to the bar in 1847. Upon the death of his brother Sir Henry Edward Leigh Dryden in July 1899, he succeeded as the 5th Baronet Dryden, of Canons Ashby and as the 8th Baronet Turner, of Ambrosden. Dryden married Frances Isabella Curwen in May 1849, with the couple having seven children. Dryden died at Canons Ashby in April 1912. Upon his death, he was succeeded as the 6th and 9th Baronet by his son, Sir Arthur Dryden.

Baronetage of Great Britain
Preceded by Henry Dryden	Baronet (of Ambrosden); 1899–1912	Succeeded by Arthur Dryden
Preceded by Henry Dryden	Baronet (of Canons Ashby); 1899–1912	Succeeded by Arthur Dryden
