= Chetwynd baronets =

Title in the Baronetage of Great Britain

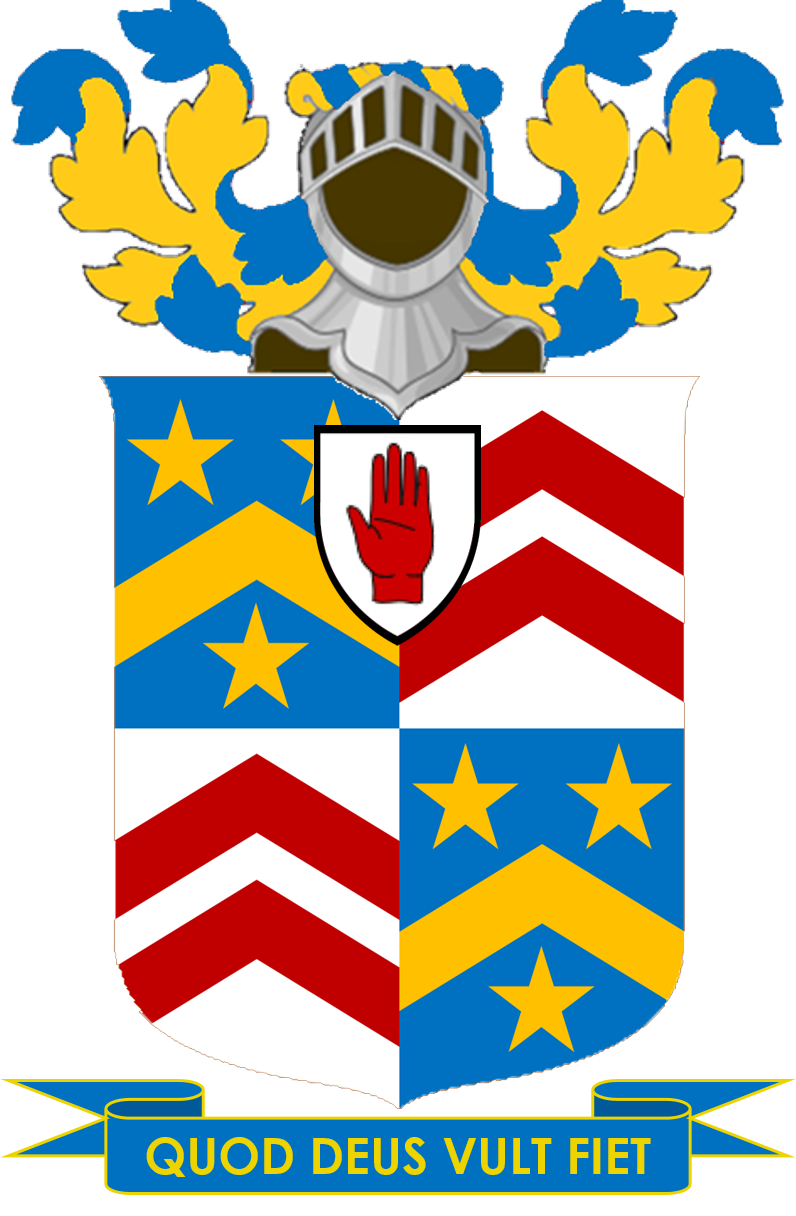
Arms: Quarterly, 1st and 4th, Azure a Chevron between three Mullets Or; 2nd and 3rd, Argent two Chevrons Gules; Motto: Quod Deus Vult Fiet (What God wills, let it be done)

The Chetwynd baronetcy, of Brocton Hall in the County of Stafford, is a title in the Baronetage of Great Britain. It was created on 1 May 1795 for Sir George Chetwynd, Kt. (died 1824), of Brocton Hall, Staffordshire, for over 60 years Clerk to the Privy Council.

The 2nd Baronet was Member of Parliament for Stafford from 1820 to 1826, and High Sheriff of Warwickshire in 1828. The 4th Baronet served as High Sheriff of Warwickshire in 1875.

The title is marked "dormant" on the Official Roll of the Baronetage.

The 1st Baronet inherited an estate at Old Grendon, North Warwickshire, in 1798, from Lady Robert Bertie (nee Mary Blundell, daughter of Montague Blundell, 1st Viscount Blundell, widow of Robert Raymond, 2nd Baron Raymond and then Lord Robert Bertie. Grendon Hall was rebuilt by Joseph Potter for the 2nd Baronet from about 1825. It was demolished c.1932.

== Chetwynd baronets, of Brocton Hall (1795) ==
- Sir George Chetwynd, 1st Baronet (1739–1824)
- Sir George Chetwynd, 2nd Baronet (1783–1850)
- Sir George Chetwynd, 3rd Baronet (1808–1869)
- Sir George Chetwynd, 4th Baronet (1849–1917)
- Sir George Guy Chetwynd, 5th Baronet (1874–1935)
- Sir Victor James Chetwynd, 6th Baronet (1902–1938)
- Sir (Arthur Henry) Talbot Chetwynd, 7th Baronet (1887–1972)
- Sir Arthur (Ralph Talbot) Chetwynd, 8th Baronet (1913–2004)
- Sir Robin John Talbot Chetwynd, presumed 9th Baronet (1941–2012), did not appear on the Official Roll of the Baronetage
- Sir Peter James Talbot Chetwynd, presumed 10th Baronet (born 1973), does not appear on the Official Roll of the Baronetage

== See also ==
- Viscount Chetwynd
- Earl of Shrewsbury
- Earl Talbot

Baronetage of Great Britain
Preceded by Stephens baronets	Chetwynd baronets of Brocton Hall; 1 May 1795	Succeeded by Dryden baronets
