= John Creed (naval administrator) =

British naval administrator

John Creed FRS (died 1701) was a British naval administrator. He was also a Fellow of the Royal Society.

== Early life ==
He came from Northamptonshire and was possibly of humble origin. His date of birth is unknown and little is known about his life prior to the Restoration. He enjoyed the patronage of Edward Montagu, who became 1st Earl of Sandwich. While Montagu successfully transitioned from being a supporter of the Commonwealth to a royalist, Creed's later career appears to have been adversely affected by his reputation as a Puritan.

== Career ==
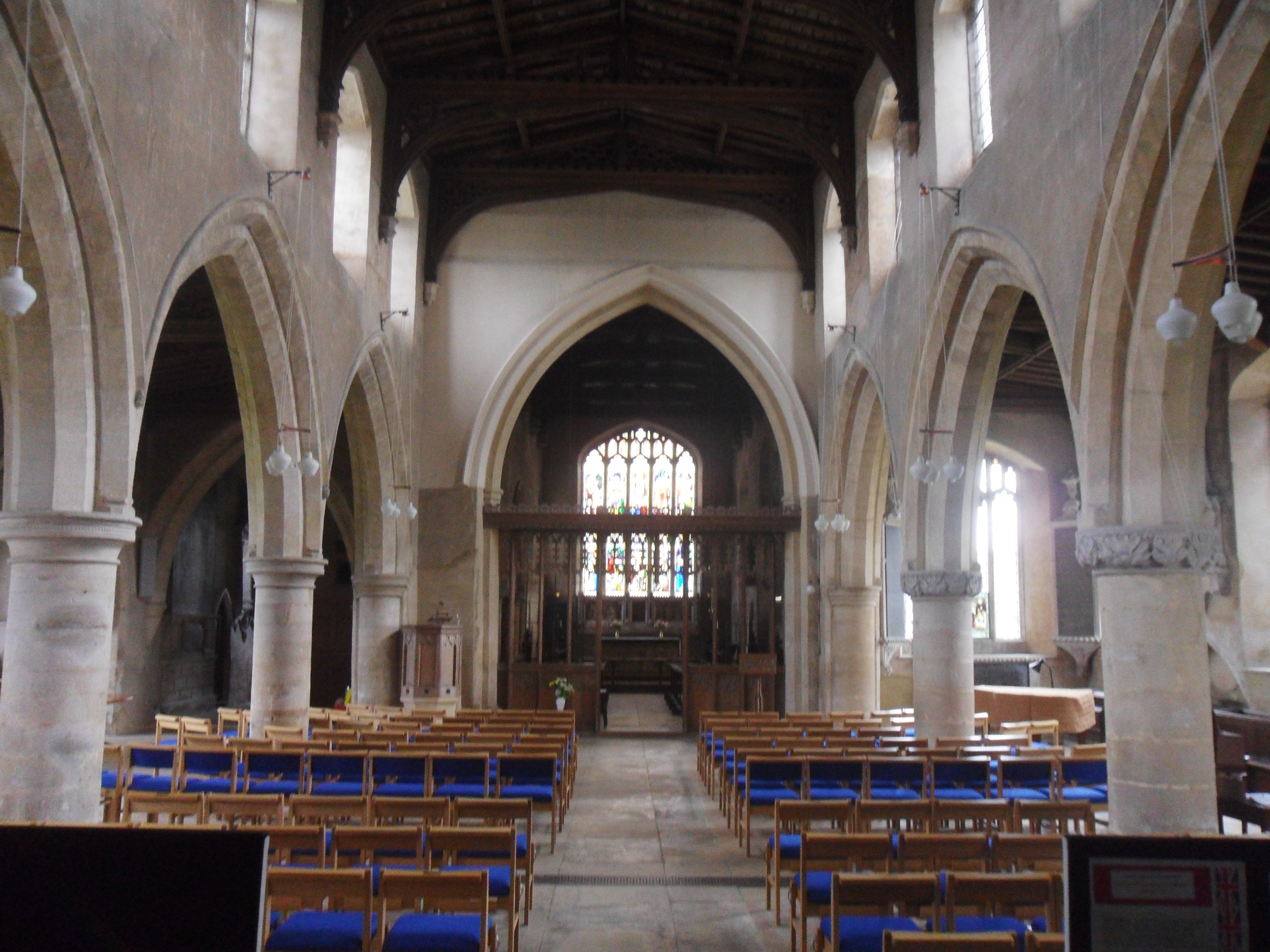
St Mary's Church, Titchmarsh, where Creed was married and buried

Creed served as secretary to Montagu, which led to involvement in naval matters. Montagu was a General at Sea under Cromwell and an Admiral under Charles II. According to his monument in Titchmarsh, Northamptonshire, Creed served Charles II in "divers honourable employments at home and abroad". One of the locations where he served was English Tangier. In 1661–2 he went as deputy treasurer with Montagu (recently made Earl of Sandwich) in the voyage to take possession of Tangier and to bring Catherine of Braganza to England.

Montagu was also patron of the famous diarist Samuel Pepys. There are negative comments about Creed in Pepys' Diary, but there is evidence that the two men had interests in common apart from their work for Montagu and the Royal Navy. Creed became a Fellow of the Royal Society in 1663 (in the early years it was not necessary for Fellows to be scientists), and it has been suggested that this may have been a factor in Pepys' interest in the Society. (Pepys was elected to a Fellowship in 1665 and later became President).

== Personal life ==
In 1668 Creed married Elizabeth Pickering, who was related to Pepys and to the Earl of Sandwich. Pepys attended the marriage which took place at Titchmarsh, Northamptonshire. He thought that Creed had married above his station, but "let them do what they will". The couple had eleven children.
