= Salusbury baronets of Llanwern (1795) =

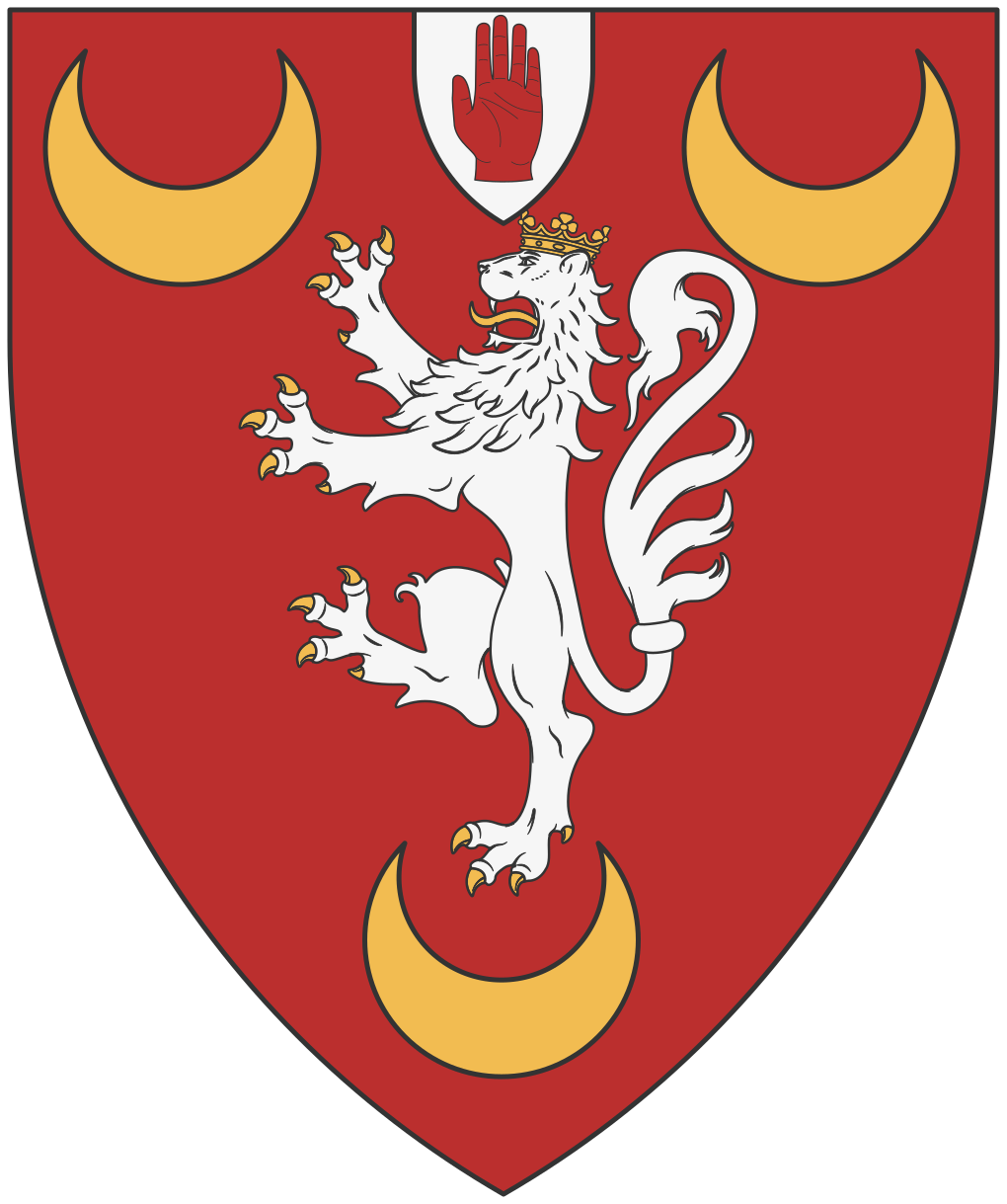
Escutcheon of the Salusbury baronets of Llanwern

The Salusbury baronetcy, of Llanwern in the County of Monmouth, was created in the Baronetage of Great Britain on 4 May 1795 for Sir Robert Salusbury, who was from North Wales but inherited property at Llanwern from his father-in-law Charles Van. He served as Member of Parliament for Monmouthshire from 1792 to 1796, followed in that seat by his nephew Sir Charles Morgan; he was returned for Brecon, where he sat from 1796 to 1812.

Suffering bankruptcy, the 1st Baronet died in 1817 and was succeeded by his eldest son, the 2nd Baronet. On the latter's death in 1835 he was succeeded by his younger brother, Charles John Salusbury, the 3rd Baronet; at whose death in 1868, without male issue, the baronetcy became extinct.

== Salusbury baronets, of Llanwern (1795) ==
- Sir Robert Salusbury, 1st Baronet (1756–1817)
- Sir Thomas Robert Salusbury, 2nd Baronet (1783–1835)
- Sir Charles John Salusbury, 3rd Baronet (1792–1868), rector of Llanwern, died unmarried.

== Notes ==
Baronetage of Great Britain
Preceded by Dryden baronets	Salusbury baronets of Llanwern; 4 May 1795	Succeeded by Gamon baronets
