= Canons Ashby Priory =

Augustinian priory in Northamptonshire, England

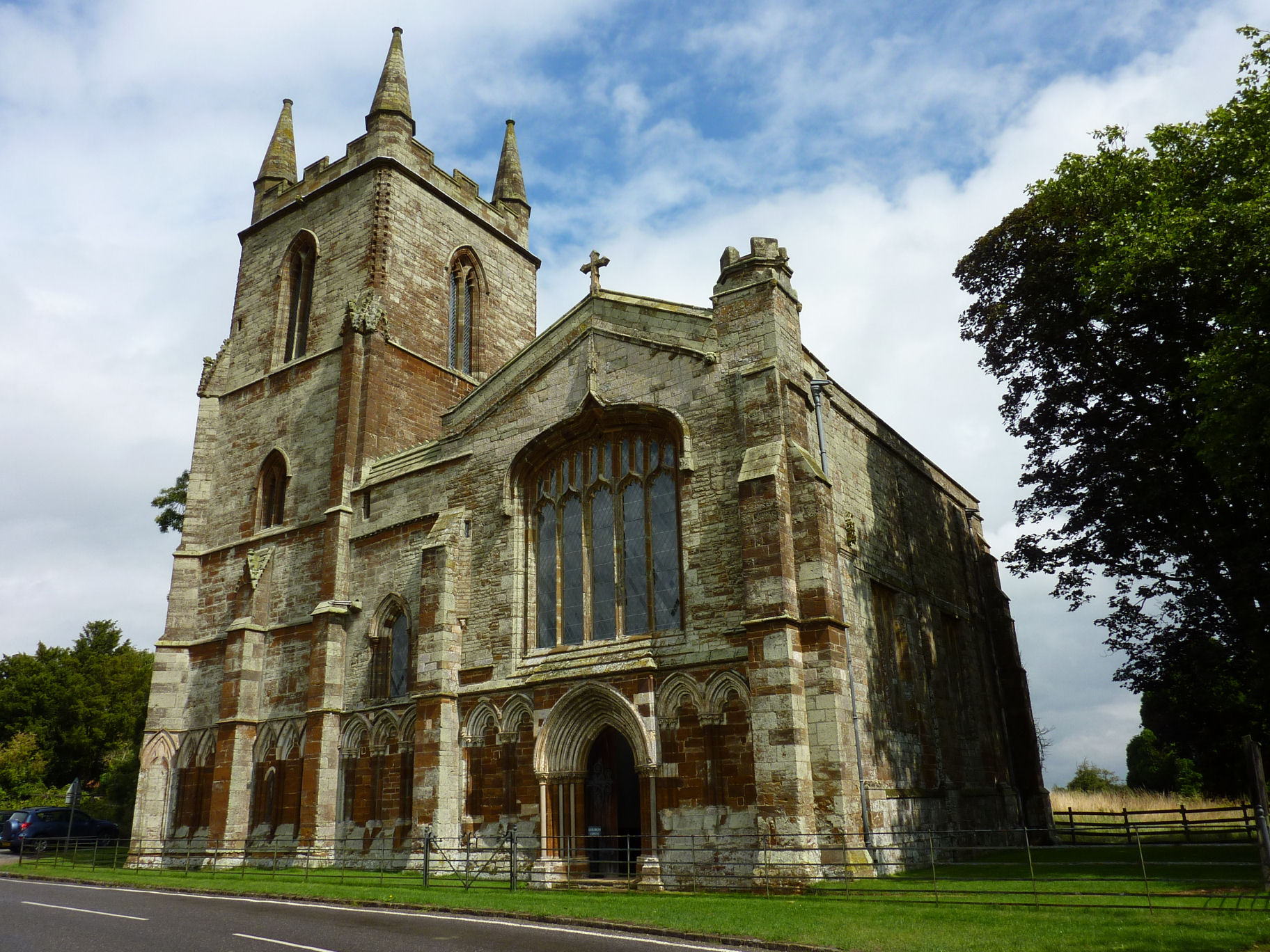
- West front of the priory church of St Mary

- Location within Northamptonshire

Monastery information
- Order: Augustinian
- Established: by 1151
- Disestablished: 1535
- Dedication: Our Lady of Ashby
- Diocese: Lincoln

People
- Founder: Stephen la Leye

Architecture
- Heritage designation: Grade II* listed
- Designated date: 18 January 1963

Site
- Location: Canons Ashby, Northamptonshire, England
- Coordinates: 52.1496°N 1.1558°W
- Grid reference: SP57795052
- Visible remains: West front, tower, three bays of the nave, and two of the east aisle.
- Public access: Yes

Canons Ashby Priory was an Augustinian priory at Canons Ashby, Northamptonshire, England.

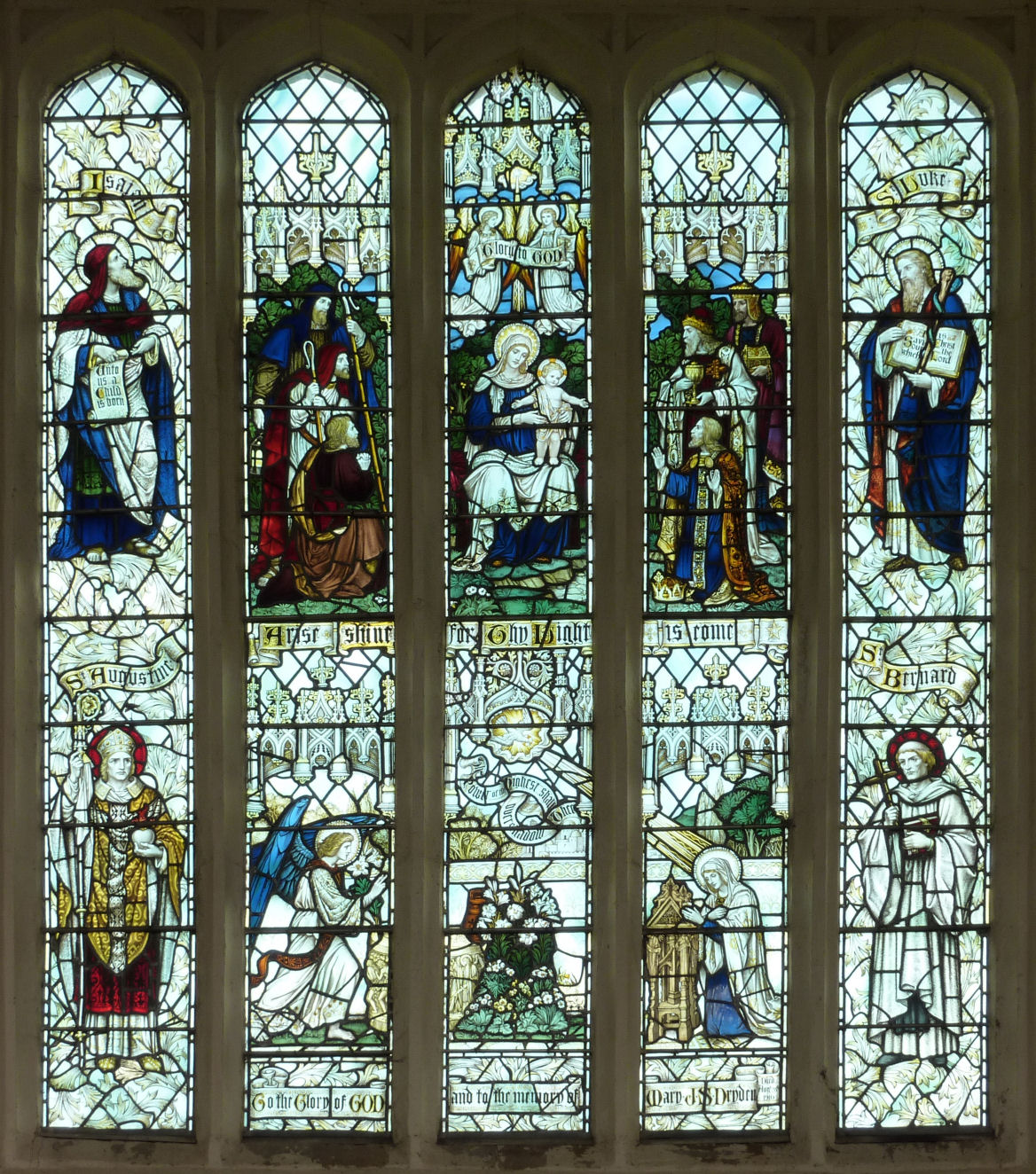
East window. The central three panels depict scenes from the life of the Virgin Mary, the Madonna and Child with the Adoration of the Shepherds and the Magi above, and the Annunciation beneath. The outer two panels depict Isaiah the Prophet, St. Luke, St. Augustine, and St. Bernard.

== History ==
The Priory was founded by Stephen la Leye on a site to the south of the present church between 1147 and 1151 in the reign of Henry II.

In 1253 the Augustinians were granted a licence to dig the Norwell, which still exists north of the present church, to supply water to the priory.

In 1452, John Nantewych is named as the prior of Canons Assheby.

In 1537 after the Dissolution of the Monasteries the Crown granted the priory and its estates to Sir Francis Bryan, a close ally of Henry VIII. Bryan held the estate for only about a year before selling it in 1538 to Sir John Cope, a wealthy Banbury lawyer. Sir John's daughter Elizabeth inherited what is thought to have been the priory farmhouse [wrong – Wilkyns farm was part of John Dryden's inheritance. Copes Ashbie – across the road – was inherited by Elizabeth's brother, who died early leaving his sons as Wards of the Dryden family]. In 1551 she married John Dryden, who extended the building to form the earliest parts of Canons Ashby House.

Part of the building survives: the Church of England parish church of St Mary dates from about 1250 and this, together with Canons Ashby House, is now owned by the National Trust. Its power and size can be judged by its outlying buildings which cover a large area of the surrounding countryside. The remains of the priory's hospitalium survive as the monastic building centred on the parish church of Maidford, about 5 miles (8 km) away.

== Burials ==
- Sir Erasmus Dryden, 1st Baronet and other members of his family
- Sir John Dryden, 2nd Baronet
- Sir Robert Dryden, 3rd Baronet (c. 1638–1708)
- Sir Erasmus Henry Dryden, 5th Baronet

== See also ==
- List of English abbeys, priories and friaries serving as parish churches

== Sources ==
- Serjeantson, R.M.; Adkins, W.R.D., eds. (1906). "The Priory of Canons Ashby". A History of the County of Northampton. Victoria County History. Vol. 2. Archibald Constable & Co. pp. 130–133.
