= Grace baronets =

Title in the Baronetage of Great Britain

The Gamon, later Grace baronetcy, of Minchenden House in the County of Middlesex, was a title in the Baronetage of Great Britain. It was created on 11 May 1795 for Richard Gamon, from 1784 to 1812 Member of Parliament for Winchester, with special remainder in default of male issue of his own to his cousin Richard Grace. Grace was a member of the Irish House of Commons for Baltimore. Gamon was succeeded according to the special remainder by William Grace, the 2nd Baronet, son of Richard Grace.

Gamon's father, also Richard, was married to Elizabeth Grace. His sister Anna Eliza married, as her second husband and his second wife, the 3rd Duke of Chandos, who was Gamon's initial parliamentary patron.

The 4th Baronet was appointed High Sheriff of County Dublin in 1888 and High Sheriff of Queen's County in 1892. The 5th Baronet was also High Sheriff of Queen's County, in 1907.

The title became extinct on the death of the 6th Baronet in 1977.

== Gamon, later Grace baronets, of Minchenden House (1795) ==
- Sir Richard Grace Gamon, 1st Baronet (1748–1818)
- Sir William Grace, 2nd Baronet (died 1841)
- Sir William Grace, 3rd Baronet (1817–1887)
- Sir Percy Raymond Grace, 4th Baronet (1831–1903)
- Sir Valentine Raymond Grace, 5th Baronet (1877–1945)
- Sir Raymond Eustace Grace, 6th Baronet (1903–1977), left no heir.

Baronetage of Great Britain
| Preceded by Salusbury baronets | Gamon baronets of Minchenden House; 11 May 1795 | Succeeded by Darell baronets |
