= John Lovel, 2nd Baron Lovel =

13th- and 14th-century English noble

Arms of John Lovel: Barry nebulee of six or and gules

John Lovel, 2nd Baron Lovel (died 24 June 1314), Lord of Titchmarsh, was an English noble. He was killed during the Battle of Bannockburn against the Scots on 23 or 24 June 1314.

He was the eldest son of John Lovel and Joan de Ros. John was summoned to Parliament in 1311. He was killed during the Battle of Bannockburn in 1314.

== Marriage and issue ==
John married Maud, daughter of Philip Burnell and Maud filias John; they are known to have had the following known issue:

- John Lovel
- Joan Lovel

He also fathered a daughter named Isabel by a daughter of Lord Strange of Blackmere.
