= Dryden (disambiguation) =

John Dryden (1631–1700) was an English poet.

Dryden may also refer to:

== People ==
- Dryden (surname)
  - Ken Dryden (1947–2025), Canadian ice hockey player, author, and politician
- Dryden McKay (born 1997), American ice hockey player

Fictional

- Mr. Dryden, a character in the film Lawrence of Arabia
- Dryden Fassa, a supporting character in the 1996 anime series The Vision of Escaflowne
- Dryden Vos, antagonist in the 2018 film Solo: A Star Wars Story

== Places ==
- Dryden (crater), a lunar impact crater on the southern hemisphere on the far side of the Moon

In Canada:

- Dryden, Ontario

In the United States:

- Dryden, Maine
- Dryden, Michigan
- Dryden Township, Michigan
- Dryden, New York
  - Dryden (village), New York
- Dryden, Oregon
- Dryden, Texas
- Dryden, Virginia
- Dryden, Washington
- Dryden Flight Research Center, the former name of the Neil A. Armstrong Flight Research Center, a NASA installation in California
