= Walter Dryden =

New Zealand cricketer (1864–1892)

Personal information
- Full name: Walter Edward Dryden
- Born: 3 July 1864; Wellington, New Zealand
- Died: 11 July 1892 (aged 28); Wellington, New Zealand
- Relatives: Charles Dryden (brother)
- Source: Cricinfo, 24 October 2020

Walter Dryden (3 July 1864 – 11 July 1892) was a New Zealand cricketer. He played in one first-class match for Wellington in 1885/86.

== See also ==
- List of Wellington representative cricketers
