= Dryden baronets =

Set index for Dryden baronets

There have been three baronetcies created for persons with the surname Dryden, one in the Baronetage of England and two in the Baronetage of Great Britain. Two of the creations are extant and unified.

- Dryden baronets of Canons Ashby (1st creation, 1619)
- Dryden baronets of Ambrosden (1733), earlier Turner, then Page-Turner baronets
- Dryden baronets of Canons Ashby (2nd creation, 1795)
