= John Lovel, 1st Baron Lovel =

13th-14th century English nobleman

Arms of John Lovel: Barry nebulee of six or and gules.

John Lovel (died 1310), Lord of Minster Lovel, Docking and Titchmarsh, was an English noble. He fought in the wars in Wales, Gascony and Scotland. He was a signatory of the Baron's Letter to Pope Boniface VIII in 1301.

== Biography ==
John was the eldest son of John Lovel and Maud Sydenham. He was active in the wars in Gascony and Scotland. John received a licence to crenellate his manor of Titchmarsh in 1304. He died in 1310.

== Marriage and issue ==
He married firstly Isabel, daughter of Arnold de Bois and Amicia, they had the following known issue:

- Maud Lovel, married William la Zouche, had issue.

After the death of his first wife, he married Joan, daughter of Robert de Ros of Helmsley and Isabel D'Aubenfy, they had the following known issue:

- Joan Lovel
- John Lovel (died 1314), married Maud Burnell, had issue.
- James Lovel
