= Dryden baronets of Ambrosden (1733) =

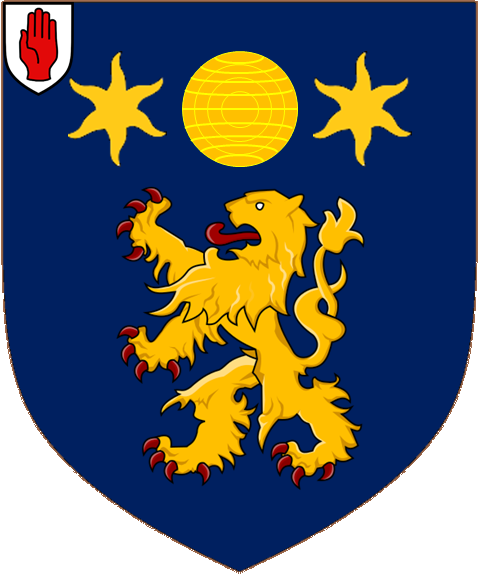
Escutcheon of the Dryden baronets of Canons Ashby

The Turner, later Page-Turner, later Dryden baronetcy, of Ambrosden in the County of Oxford, was created in the Baronetage of Great Britain on 24 August 1733 for Edward Turner, son of the wealthy London merchant John Turner.

The 2nd Baronet sat as Member of Parliament for Great Bedwyn from 1741 to 1747, Oxfordshire from 1755 to 1761, and Penrhyn from 1761 to 1766. The 3rd Baronet represented Thirsk in the House of Commons from 1784 to 1805. In 1775 he inherited substantial estates on the death of his great-uncle Sir Gregory Page, 2nd Baronet and assumed the additional surname of Page.

On the death in 1874 of the 6th Baronet, a Fellow of the Society of Antiquaries of London, the title was inherited by Sir Henry Edward Leigh Dryden, 4th Baronet, of Canons Ashby, and the titles were united.

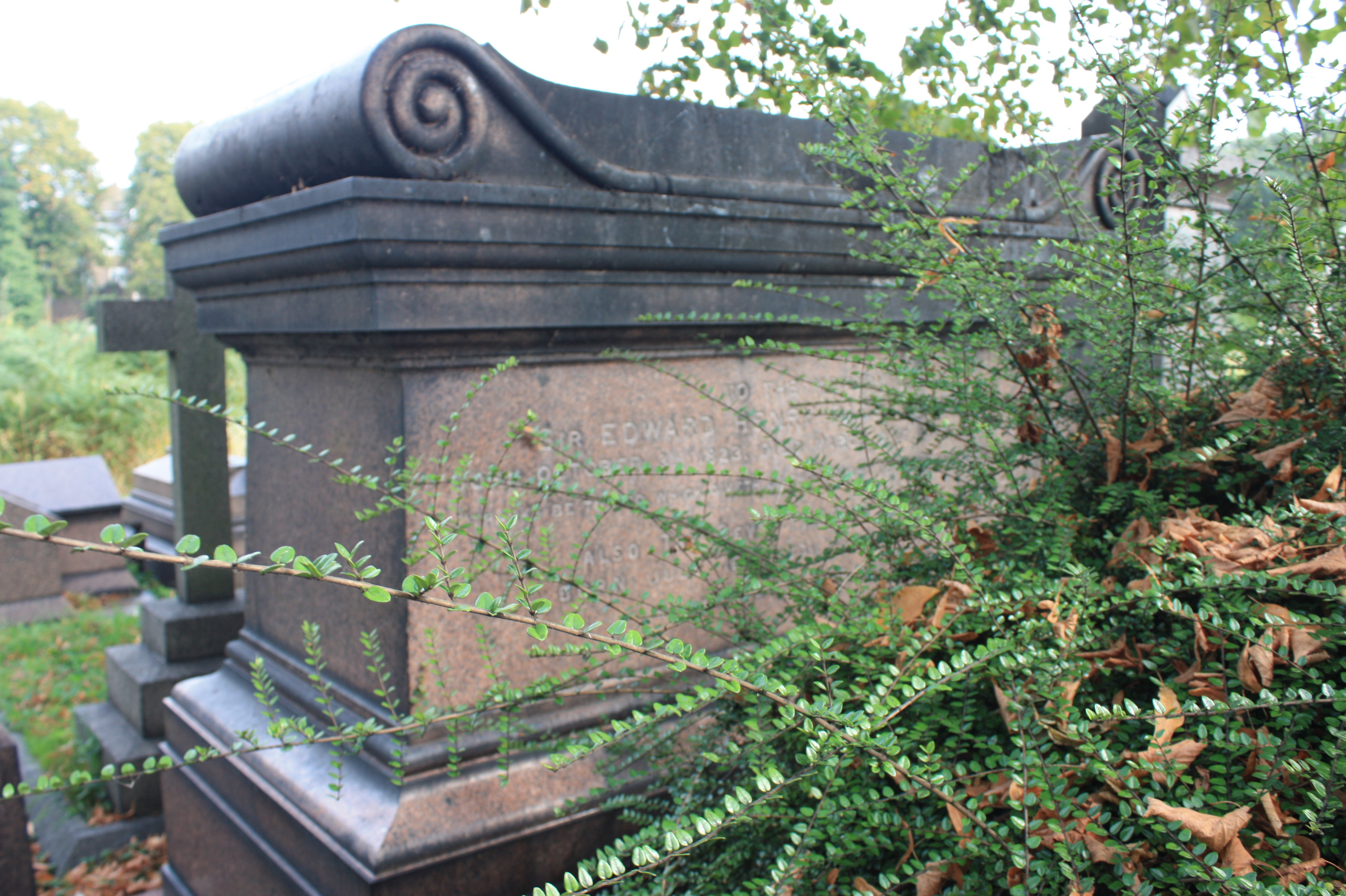
The grave of Sir Edward Henry Page Turner (1823–1874), Brompton Cemetery, London

== Turner, later Page-Turner, later Dryden baronets, of Ambrosden (1733) ==
- Sir Edward Turner, 1st Baronet (1691–1735)
- Sir Edward Turner, 2nd Baronet (1719–1766).
- Sir Gregory Page-Turner, 3rd Baronet (1748–1805)
- Sir Gregory Osborne Page-Turner, 4th Baronet (1785–1843)
- Sir Edward George Thomas Page-Turner, 5th Baronet (1789–1846)
- Sir Edward Henry Page-Turner, 6th Baronet (1823–1874)
- Sir Henry Edward Leigh Dryden, 7th Baronet (1818–1899) (also 4th Baronet of Canons Ashby, from 1837)

See Dryden baronets of Canons Ashby (2nd creation, 1795) for the further succession.

== Extended family ==
The second son John of the 2nd Baronet was created 1st Baronet of Canons Ashby, second creation in 1795.

== Notes ==
Baronetage of Great Britain
| Preceded by Heathcote baronets | Turner baronets of Ambrosden; 24 August 1733 | Succeeded by Peachey baronets |
