= OmiSoore Dryden =

Canadian academic

- Website: omisooredryden.com

OmiSoore H. Dryden is an academic whose work aims to identify barriers queer Black men encounter when donating blood in Canada.

== Early life and education ==
Dryden earned her PhD in social justice education from the Ontario Institute for the Study of Education and the University of Toronto. Her dissertation focused on how blood donation regulations discriminate against queer people with a specific focus on Black queer people.

== Career ==
While working as an assistant professor of women's, gender and sexuality studies at Thorneloe University in Sudbury, Ontario, Dryden received funding from Canadian Blood Services to study racist and homophobic attitudes and stigmas perpetuated by blood donation questionnaires.

Dryden is the James R. Johnston Chair in Black Canadian Studies in the faculty of medicine at Dalhousie University, where she is also an associate professor in the department of community health and epidemiology. Dryden was first Black person appointed to the Nova Scotia Health Authority Board of Directors. The Board was disbanded in 2021. In 2025, Dryden was appointed to the Dalhousie University School of Nursing.

== Personal life ==
Dryden is a Black queer femme. She moved to Nova Scotia in 2019. Dryden has Crohn's disease

== Publications ==
- "Canadians Denied: A Queer Diasporic Analysis of the Canadian Blood Donor" in Canadian Perspectives in Sexualities Studies:Identities, Experiences, and the Contexts of Change (2012)
- "Má-ka Juk Yuh: A Genealogy of Black Queer Liveability in Toronto" in Queering Urban Justice: Queer of Colour Formations in Toronto (2018)
- "It's in Us to Give: Black Life and the Racial Profiling of Blood Donation" in Until We Are Free: Reflections on Black Lives Matter in Canada (2020)
- "Who Gets To Do Medicine: Black Canadian Studies and Medical Education." Special Issue Black Studies in Canada. TOPIA: Canadian Journal of Cultural Studies (2022)

=== Books ===
- Disrupting Queer Inclusion: Canadian Homonationalisms and the Politics of Belonging, co-edited with Suzanne Lenon (2015)
  - Chapter: “A Queer Too Far”: Blackness, Gay Blood and Transgressive Possibilities"
- Got Blood to Give: Anti-Black Homophobia in Blood Donation (2024)
