= Charles Dryden (cricketer) =

New Zealand cricketer

Personal information
- Full name: Charles Henry Dryden
- Born: 13 January 1860; Wellington, New Zealand
- Died: 1 July 1943 (aged 83); Kawakawa, Bay of Islands, New Zealand
- Batting: Left-handed
- Bowling: Right-arm leg-spin

Domestic team information
- Years: Team
- 1884/85–1894/95: Wellington

Career statistics
Competition	First-class
Matches	21
Runs scored	177
Batting average	5.70
100s/50s	0/0
Top score	23
Balls bowled	2,034
Wickets	76
Bowling average	11.42
5 wickets in innings	7
10 wickets in match	2
Best bowling	7/24
Catches/stumpings	12/–
- Source: Cricinfo, 16 January 2018

Charles Henry Dryden (13 January 1860 – 1 July 1943) was a New Zealand cricketer who played first-class cricket for Wellington from 1885 to 1894.

== Cricket career ==
Dryden was a leg-spin bowler who was noted for his effectiveness in difficult situations and recorded several notable bowling performances for Wellington. He was also regarded as a resilient lower-order batsman and a reliable fieldsman.

Dryden's best match figures were 12 for 93 (7 for 58 and 5 for 35) in a loss to Canterbury in 1889–90, when Albert Moss took all ten Wellington wickets in the first innings. He twice took his best innings figures of 7 for 24: when Nelson needed 84 to win in 1886–87 he was mainly responsible for dismissing them for 70; and in 1893–94 he helped dismiss Auckland for 77.

== Personal life ==
Dryden worked as a building contractor in Wellington. He and his wife had a daughter and a son. He died in hospital at Kawakawa in the Bay of Islands in July 1943, aged 83. His brother Walter played one first-class match in 1885–86, alongside Charles.
