= Dryden baronets of Canons Ashby (1st creation, 1619) =

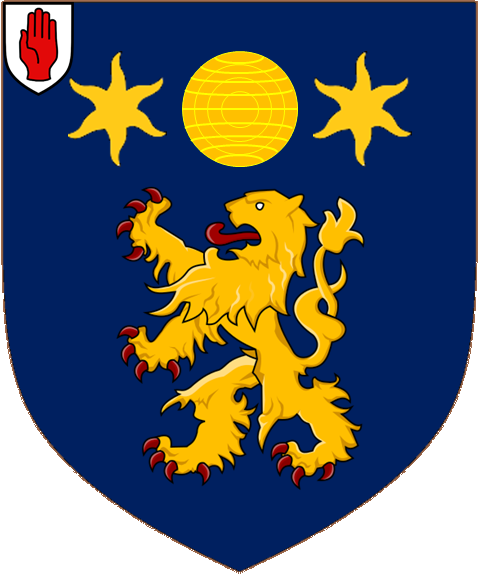
Escutcheon of the Dryden baronets of Canons Ashby

The Dryden baronetcy, of Canons Ashby in the County of Northampton, was created in the Baronetage of England on 16 November 1619 for Erasmus Dryden. He was in the Fleet Prison in 1605, after signing a pro-Puritan petition of Sir Francis Hastings. He was High Sheriff of Northamptonshire in 1598 and 1619, and subsequently Member of Parliament for Banbury in 1624.

The 2nd Baronet represented Northamptonshire in the Long Parliament. The title became extinct on the death of the 7th Baronet in 1770.

== Dryden baronets, of Canons Ashby (1619) ==
- Sir Erasmus Dryden, 1st Baronet (1553–1632)
- Sir John Dryden, 2nd Baronet (c. 1580–c.1658)
- Sir Robert Dryden, 3rd Baronet (c.1638–1708)
- Sir John Dryden, 4th Baronet (c.1635–1710)
- Sir Erasmus Henry Dryden, 5th Baronet (1669–1710)
- Sir Erasmus Dryden, 6th Baronet (1636–1718)
- Sir John Dryden, 7th Baronet (c.1704–1770)

== Extended family ==
The poet John Dryden was the grandson of the 1st Baronet, and father of the 5th Baronet who became a Dominican priest.
