= Dummy boards =

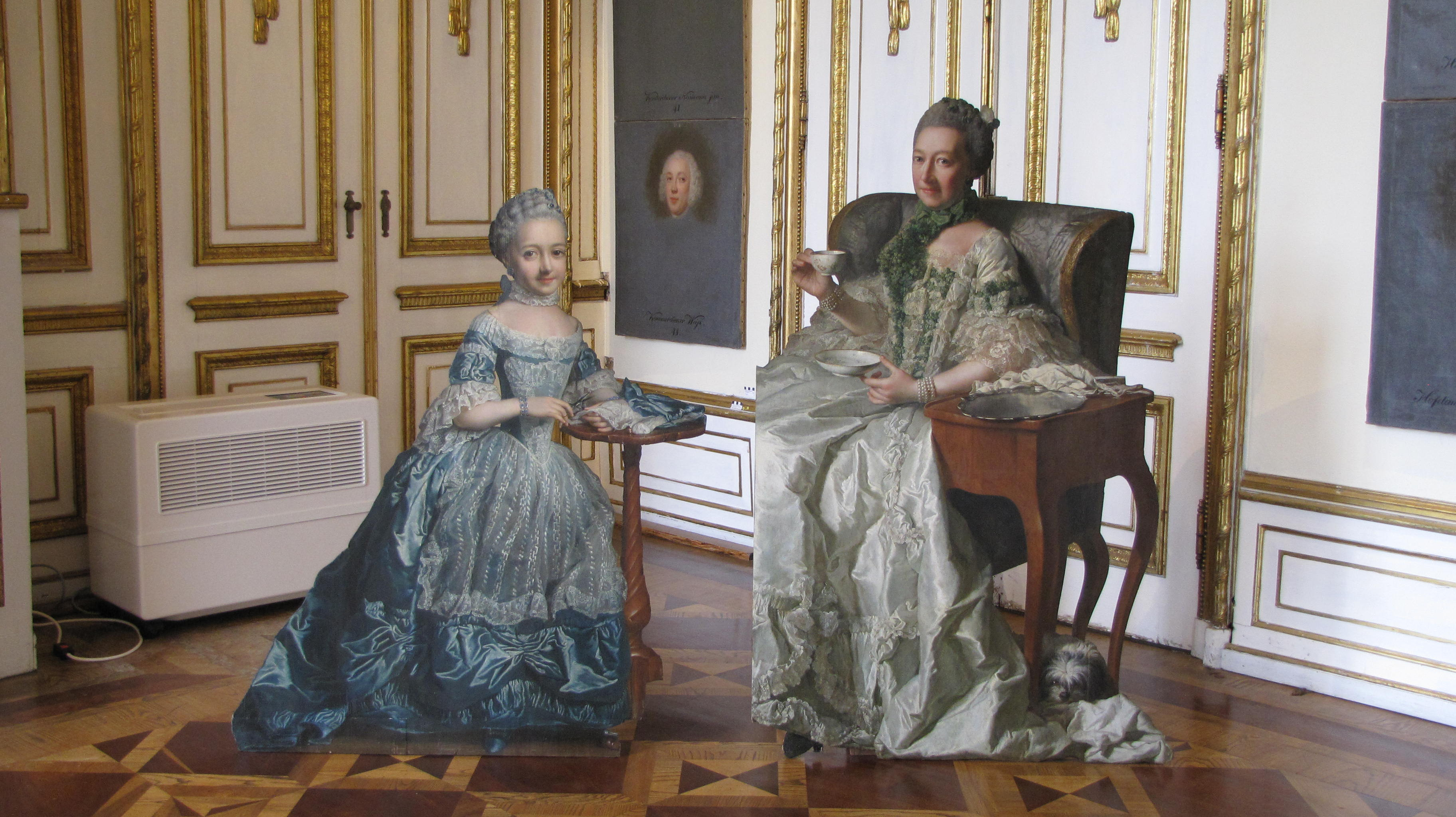

Dummy boards, silent companions were life-size paintings on flat wood panels, made from the 17th through the 19th century. They were placed in corners and on stairways to surprise visitors, or in front of empty fireplaces in the summer.

== Links ==
- Exploring the history of dummy boards // National Trust

== See also ==
- Standee
- Photo stand-in
- Fireboard
- Staffage
