= Fanny Bury Palliser =

English writer on art, and lace (1805–1878)

- Born: 1805
- Died: 1878 (aged 72–73); Kensington
- Resting place: Brompton cemetery
- Occupation: Writer
- Known for: Lace
- Parents: Joseph Marryat (father); Charlotte Marryat (mother)
- Relatives: Frederick Marryat (brother)

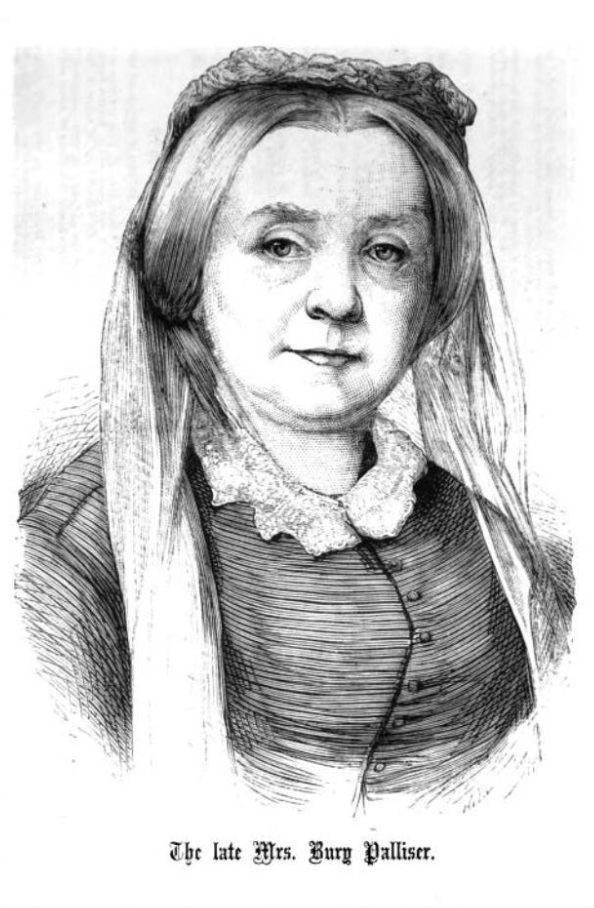

Fanny Bury Palliser (1805–1878) was an English writer on art and lace.

== Life ==
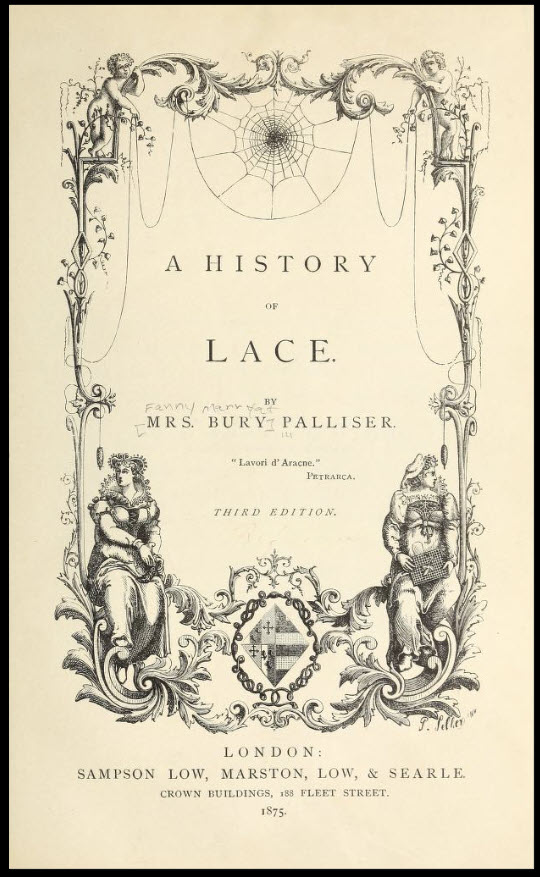
A History of Lace, Third edition by Fanny Bury Palliser

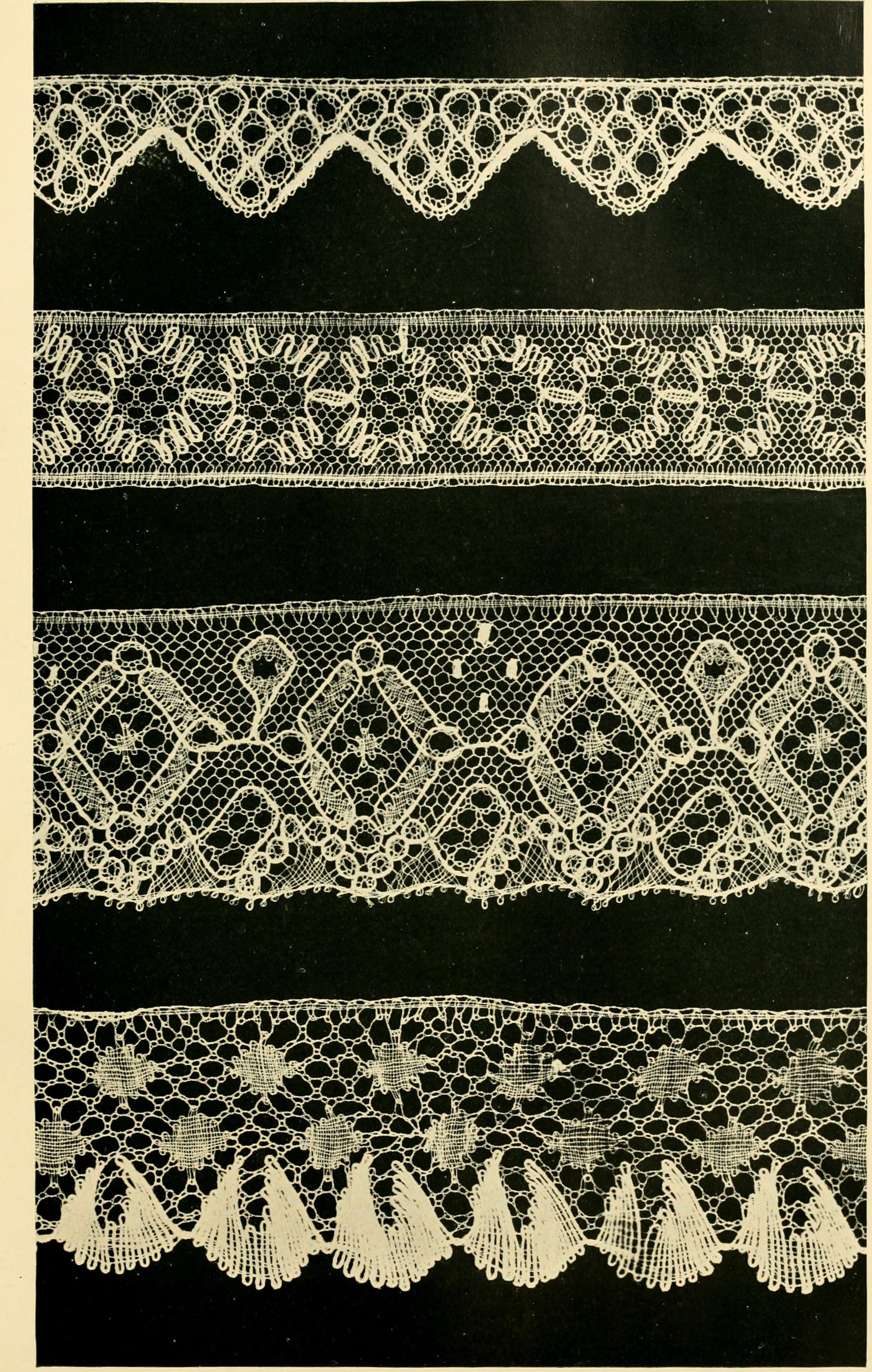
Sample page from "History of Lace" 1902

Born on 23 September 1805, she was the daughter of Joseph Marryat, M.P., of Wimbledon, by his wife Charlotte, daughter of Frederic Geyer of Boston, Massachusetts; she was a sister of Frederick Marryat the novelist. In 1832 she married Captain Richard Bury Palliser, who died in 1852, and with whom she had four sons and two daughters.

Palliser took a leading part in the organisation of the international lace exhibition held at South Kensington in 1874. She died at her residence, 33 Russell Road, Kensington, on 16 January 1878, and was buried in Brompton cemetery.

== Works ==
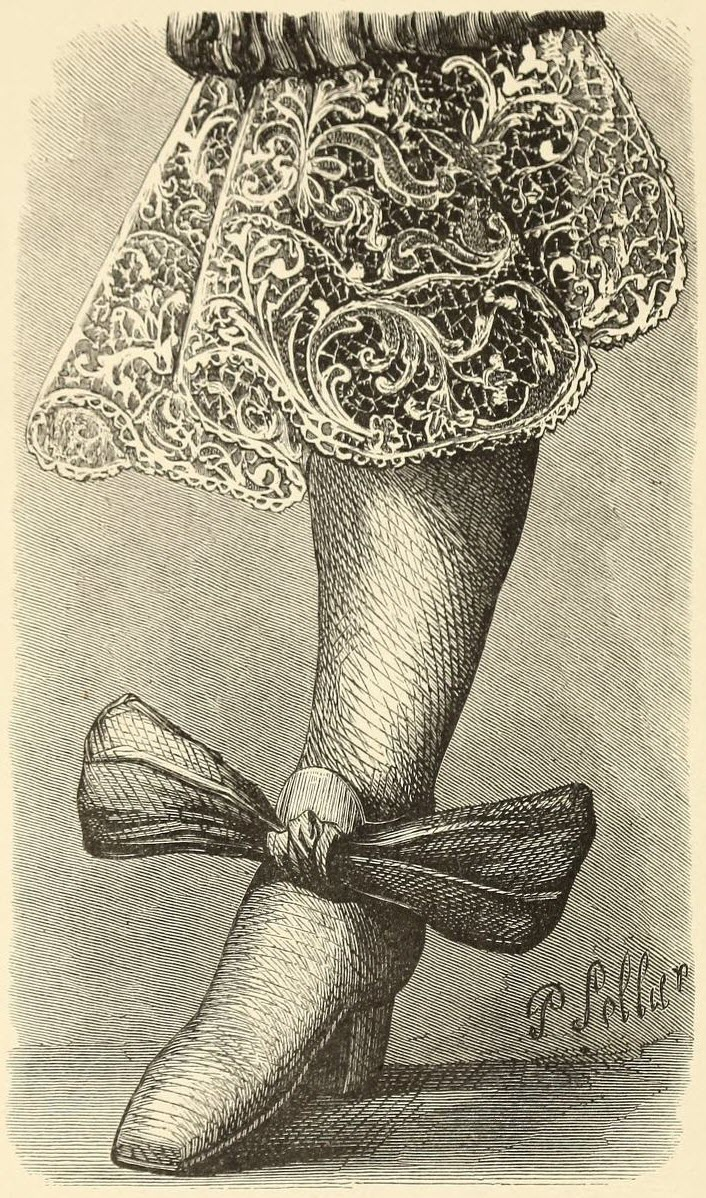
Illustration from History of Lace (1875) by Fanny Bury Palliser

Palliser was a contributor to the Art Journal and The Academy, and was the author of:

- The Modern Poetical Speaker, or a Collection of Pieces adapted for Recitation … from the Poets of the Nineteenth Century, London, 1845.
- History of Lace, with numerous illustrations, London, 1865; 3rd edit. 1875. This was translated into French by the Comtesse de Clermont Tonnerre.
- Brittany and its Byways: some Account of its Inhabitants and its Antiquities, London, 1869.
- Historic Devices, Badges, and War Cries, London, 1870; enlarged and extended from a series of papers on the subject in the Art Journal.
- A Descriptive Catalogue of the Lace and Embroidery in the South Kensington Museum, 1871; 2nd edit. 1873; 3rd edit. 1881.
- Mottoes for Monuments; or Epitaphs selected for Study or Application. Illustrated with Designs by Flaxman and others, London, 1872.
- The China Collector's Pocket Companion, London, 1874; 2nd edit. 1875.
- A Brief History of Germany to the Battle of Königgratz, on the plan of Mrs. Markham's histories.

She translated from the French Handbook of the Arts of the Middle Ages, 1855, by Charles Jules Labarte, and History of the Ceramic Art and History of Furniture, 1878, both by Albert Jacquemart. She also assisted her eldest brother Joseph Marryat in revising the second edition (1857) of his History of Pottery and Porcelain.

== Notes ==
Attribution
