= Charles Dryden =

American journalist

- Charles Dryden in 1907
- Born: March 1860; Monmouth, Illinois
- Died: February 11, 1931 (aged 70); Biloxi, Mississippi
- Occupation(s): Baseball writer and humorist
- Awards: J. G. Taylor Spink Award (1965)

Charles Dryden (March 10, 1860 – February 11, 1931) was an American baseball writer and humorist. He was reported to be the most famous and highly paid baseball writer in the United States during the 1900s. Known for injecting humor into his baseball writing, Dryden was credited with elevating baseball writing from the commonplace. In 1928, The Saturday Evening Post wrote: "The greatest of all the reporters, and the man to whom the game owes more, perhaps, than to any other individual, was Charles Dryden, the Mark Twain of baseball."

In 1965, Dryden posthumously received the J. G. Taylor Spink Award, the highest award bestowed by the Baseball Writers' Association of America; he was the fourth writer to receive that honor. His biography at the National Baseball Hall of Fame notes that he was "often regarded as the master baseball writer of his time."

== Early years ==
Dryden was born in March 1860 in Monmouth, Illinois. His father, William A. Dryden, was an Ohio native who worked as a salesman. Dryden did not attend college and worked as a young man as a moulder in an iron foundry. At the time of the 1880 United States census, Dryden was living with his father in Monmouth, and his occupation was listed as a "moulder." Several accounts indicate that he wrote humorous sketches while working at the foundry and was urged to pursue a writing career by a friend who read his sketches.

Dryden traveled extensively as a young man, taking jobs as a merchant sailor and fisherman. One colleague noted that there was "a queer gleam, as of the old wanderlust, in the man's eyes when he falls to talking of the sea." In the early 1890s, Dryden visited and wrote about Robert Louis Stevenson at Stevenson's home in Vailima, Samoa. His portrayal of Stevenson's life in Samoa was described as "one of the nearest and most clear-cut pictures yet made on the subject."

Dryden later published an autobiographical account of his years on the road. The book, titled "On and Off the Bread Wagon: Being the Hard Luck Tales, Doings and Adventures of an Amateur Hobo" was published in 1905.

== Baseball writer ==
=== San Francisco and Tacoma ===
Dryden wrote his first baseball story in 1889. He had reportedly never seen a regular game of baseball before the assignment. His first baseball story was an account of a game in Chicago written "in imitation of the stilted, archaic phrase of Bible language." The story was "an instant hit." From 1889 to 1896, Dryden worked for newspapers in San Francisco and Tacoma.

=== New York ===
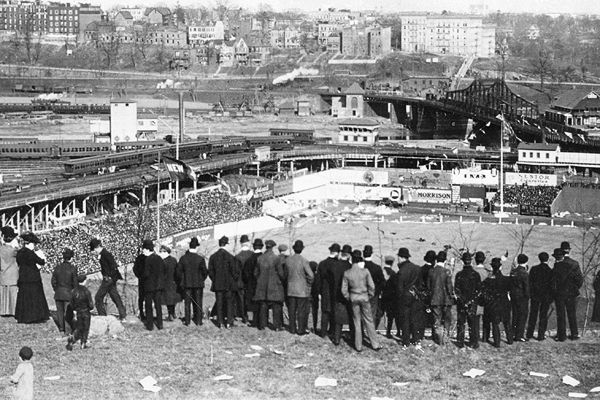
View from Coogan's Bluff.

In 1896, William Randolph Hearst hired Dryden as a writer for the New York Journal. While working in New York, Dryden gained national fame as a result of a lengthy public quarrel with Andrew Freedman, the owner of the New York Giants. The feud began during spring training in 1898. Dryden asked Freedman for a comment on a player with whom Freedman was in a salary dispute. Dryden published a story the next day making fun of both Freedman and the player, referring to Freedman as "the spurned magnate." Freedman was angered by the account and had Dryden banned from the hotel where the Giants were staying. The next day, Dryden ran an article noting that he had been informed of the ban while trying to put a tablespoon of soup in his mouth at the hotel restaurant. Freedman escalated the punishment by banning Dryden from the Polo Grounds. The next day, Dryden watched the game from Coogan's Bluff, overlooking the Polo Grounds, and reported that "the Giants don't look any better from here." When Dryden continued to make Freedman the butt of his jokes, calling him "Andy" in a series of articles, Freedman announced publicly that "this here feller Dryden had better look out because he's standing on the brink of an abscess [sic] and the first thing he knows I'll push him in." The next day, Homer Davenport published a cartoon showing Freedman pushing Dryden, with his pencil and scorecard, into a black abyss.

The Freedman articles were a sensation and reportedly "kept not only New York but the entire country convulsed by [Dryden's] clever quips."

=== Philadelphia ===
In 1900, the publisher of The North American (later merged into The Philadelphia Inquirer) hired Dryden away from Hearst. Hearst reportedly made "exceptional offers" to persuade Dryden to stay, but the Philadelphia newspaper was the high bidder. The Philadelphia Athletics of the early 1900s, with colorful players like Rube Waddell, Ossee Schreckengost, Chief Bender and Socks Seybold, were ideally suited to Dryden's colorful writing style. One colleague recalled, "This team gave Charley Dryden a chance to exercise his talents to their utmost. Story after story was a classic."

In one of his most famous stories, Dryden wrote about a "bleary-eyed" Rube Waddell leaving a saloon and jumping into the Delaware River to rescue what he believed to be a drowning woman. Dryden wrote: "With strong strokes he swam out to her, shouting words of encouragement the while. But when he tried to put his arms around her he found 'she' was just a big black log."

After Sherry Magee fell from a second-story window, Dryden wrote a comical, fictional account of the events leading up to the incident. He wrote that Magee had enjoyed a midnight dinner of Welsh rarebit which was followed by a vivid dream in which Magee was batting against Mordecai Brown. In the dream, Magee stepped forward to hit Brown's curveball before it broke and woke up on the street in his nightie.

When a mad dog, foaming at the mouth, ran across the field during a game at the Polo Grounds, Dryden quipped that the dog had been bitten by Giants' manager John McGraw, who was known for his fierce competitive spirit.

By the early 1900s, Dryden was the country's most famous baseball writer. In 1903, a newspaper story on Dryden noted: "Nobody writes like him, nobody gets the same infectious twists and turns of merriment, and none of his imitators has succeeded in reproducing the entirely unforced effect. For the last thirteen years Dryden has classed by himself in this particular branch of newspaper writing." His works were so popular that they were frequently printed on front pages across the country. He was reported to be "one of the first sportswriters to earn a byline."

Unlike most sports writers of the day, who worked year-round and covered a full range of sporting events, Dryden limited himself to baseball and spent the winters living in a bungalow on the Gulf of Mexico in Mississippi. A profile of Dryden published in 1905 noted: “He goes down there at the season's close and loafs, with occasional spells of writing, going fishing for the greater part of every day.”

=== Chicago ===
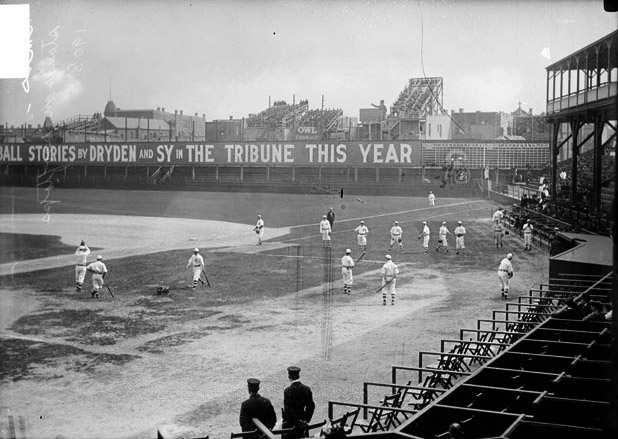
Billboard advertising Dryden's column at Chicago's West Side Park

In October 1906, the Chicago Daily Tribune signed Dryden to cover the Chicago White Sox and Chicago Cubs during the 1907 baseball season. He was the highest paid sports writer in the United States at the Chicago Daily Tribune. He remained in Chicago for several years and worked variously for the Chicago Examiner and the Chicago Herald-Examiner, as well as the Chicago Daily Tribune.

=== Legacy ===
Dryden was fondly remembered by the generation of sports writers and fans who grew up reading his work. When Ring Lardner was praised for his work as a baseball humorist, he replied, "Me, a humorist? Have you guys read any of Charley Dryden's stuff lately? He makes me look like a novice."

Baseball Hall of Fame writer Fred Lieb wrote that Dryden inspired him to become a baseball writer. He recalled that, as a teenager, "I couldn't wait until I could get at his baseball stories in the morning." Lieb called Dryden baseball's greatest interpreter, a man who "towered over the baseball writers of his day and since as Mark Twain towered over contemporary humorists." Stanley Walker, the editor of the New York Herald Tribune wrote that Dryden "probably deserves to be called the father of modern sports writing." In 1928, The Saturday Evening Post wrote: "The greatest of all the reporters, and the man to whom the game owes more, perhaps, than to any other individual, was Charles Dryden, the Mark Twain of baseball."

At the time of Dryden's death, Associated Press writer Charles W. Dunkley called him "the man who originated nearly all the expressions used in writing baseball today." The Sporting News called him "a master of style and color" and noted that "he created a vogue that lifted baseball accounts out of the commonplace and gave the game a distinctive language all its own." Another colleague, Edgar Brands, wrote that baseball writing before Dryden was dull and prosaic and credited Dryden with having "lifted baseball out of the commonplace and made it almost a religion at whose shrine thousands worshiped."

In a book on the history of journalism published in 2002, the authors described Dryden's role in the evolution of sports journalism:

"As the 19th century yielded to the 20th, sports pages acquired a new language and a distinctive flavor. The seminal figure in this transformation was Charley Dryden ... He brought wit and humor to sports news and combined a passion for journalism with a talent for entertainment. He introduced lively, slangy language into his stories."

=== Dryden's wit ===
Dryden developed enduring nicknames for the baseball personalities of his era. Among others, he dubbed Chicago Cubs manager Frank Chance as "The Peerless Leader," Chicago White Sox owner Charles Comiskey as "The Old Roman," Cubs outfielder Frank Schulte as "Wildfire" Schulte, heavy-drinking pitcher Phil Douglas as "Shuffling Phil," and Ed Walsh as both "The Big Moose" and "Alibi Ed."

He was also responsible for coining phrases that became a part of baseball's lexicon. According to The New York Times, he was the first person to refer to a baseball park as a "ball yard." After a modification of the baseball rules in 1892 to allow substitutions, Dryden coined the phrase "pinch hit" to describe the practice of bringing a new hitter into the game "as a substitution made in 'a pinch'." He was also the first writer to refer to baseball scouts as "ivory hunters." He also referred to the baseball as the "old horsehide" and the football as the "oblate spheroid."

The 1904 Washington Senators were playing so poorly in the summer of 1904 that Dryden famously wrote, "Washington – first in war, first in peace, and last in the American League," a play on the famous line in Henry Lee III's eulogy for President George Washington as "First in war, first in peace, and first in the hearts of his countrymen".

When the Chicago White Sox won the 1906 World Series despite having a .230 team batting average (the lowest in the American League), Dryden dubbed the team "The Hitless Wonders."

After a base-running error by Fred Merkle cost the 1908 New York Giants the pennant, Dryden referred to Merkle as a "bonehead." From that point forward, Merkle became known as "Bonehead" Merkle, and the play has gone down in baseball history as "Merkle's Boner."

In 1908, Chicago White Sox pitcher Ed Walsh compiled a record of 40 wins and 15 losses. Commenting on Walsh's uninhibited pride in the accomplishment, Dryden described Walsh as "the only man I've ever known who could strut sitting down." Dryden's line was later recycled in other works. In the 1931 Academy Award-winning film, Cimarron, the leading man (played by Richard Dix) says of his adversary, "He is the only man who can strut while sitting down." In the 1955 play Inherit the Wind, the Clarence Darrow character called William Jennings Bryan "the only man I've ever known who could strut sitting down."

After a controversy involving an attempt to bribe a scorekeeper to give Nap Lajoie the 1910 batting championship (see 1910 Chalmers Award), Dryden wrote that the incident led him to regard fishing as "the only honest sport" and noted that, even there, "the men who engage in that are liars."

Dryden was also known for engaging in a "battle of wits" with editors and proofreaders as he tried to weave double entendres into his work. In his autobiography, Fred Lieb recalled an instance involving a rookie pitcher named Gene Krapp. Dryden wrote a piece describing the pitcher's success in working his way out of a jam: "Krapp squeezed his way out of a tight hole when, with the bases loaded, he induced Rollie Zeider to line to Bill Wambsganss for an inning-ending double play."

He was also known to spice his game coverage with fanciful yarns. In August 1903, Dryden wrote that, during a game in Boston, Rube Waddell hit a towering foul ball that landed on the roof of an adjacent beanery and became jammed in a valve. According to Dryden's account, a steam cauldron exploded, showering the fans in the right field bleachers with 2,000 pounds of scalding beans. Dryden's account was so vivid that even Harry Davis, who played in the game, recalled the incident 50 years later as the "freakiest thing I ever saw happen at a ballpark." Davis added, "I know that doesn't make much sense, but it actually happened, late in the 1903 season. And I've got a newspaper clipping to prove it."

== Later years ==
In June 1921, Dryden suffered a stroke at age 61 while visiting Chicago to receive treatment from an eye specialist. The stroke left one side of Dryden's body paralyzed, and he was unable to speak for the remainder of his life.

Dryden never married. After the stroke, he was cared for by his sister Louise (Dryden) Davenport. They lived in a cottage on the Gulf of Mexico, near St. Petersburg, Florida, until 1924. He then moved to Ocean Springs, Mississippi. At the time of the 1930 United States census, Dryden was living in Ocean Springs with his sister.

Dryden died in February 1931 at a hospital in Biloxi, Mississippi. According to one account, "he died a broken scrivener, who, for years, sat all day motionless in a chair, helpless, uncomprehending, with only the tick of a clock to remind him of the passing of time." His body was brought to Monmouth, Illinois for burial.

== Posthumous honors ==
In November 1965, Dryden became the fourth writer selected by the Baseball Writers' Association of America to receive the J. G. Taylor Spink Award for distinguished baseball writing. Recipients of the Spink Award are recognized at the National Baseball Hall of Fame and Museum in what is commonly referred to as the "writers wing" of the Hall of Fame.
