= Canons Ashby =

Village and civil parish in Northamptonshire, England

Coordinates: 52.1480°N 1.1559°W

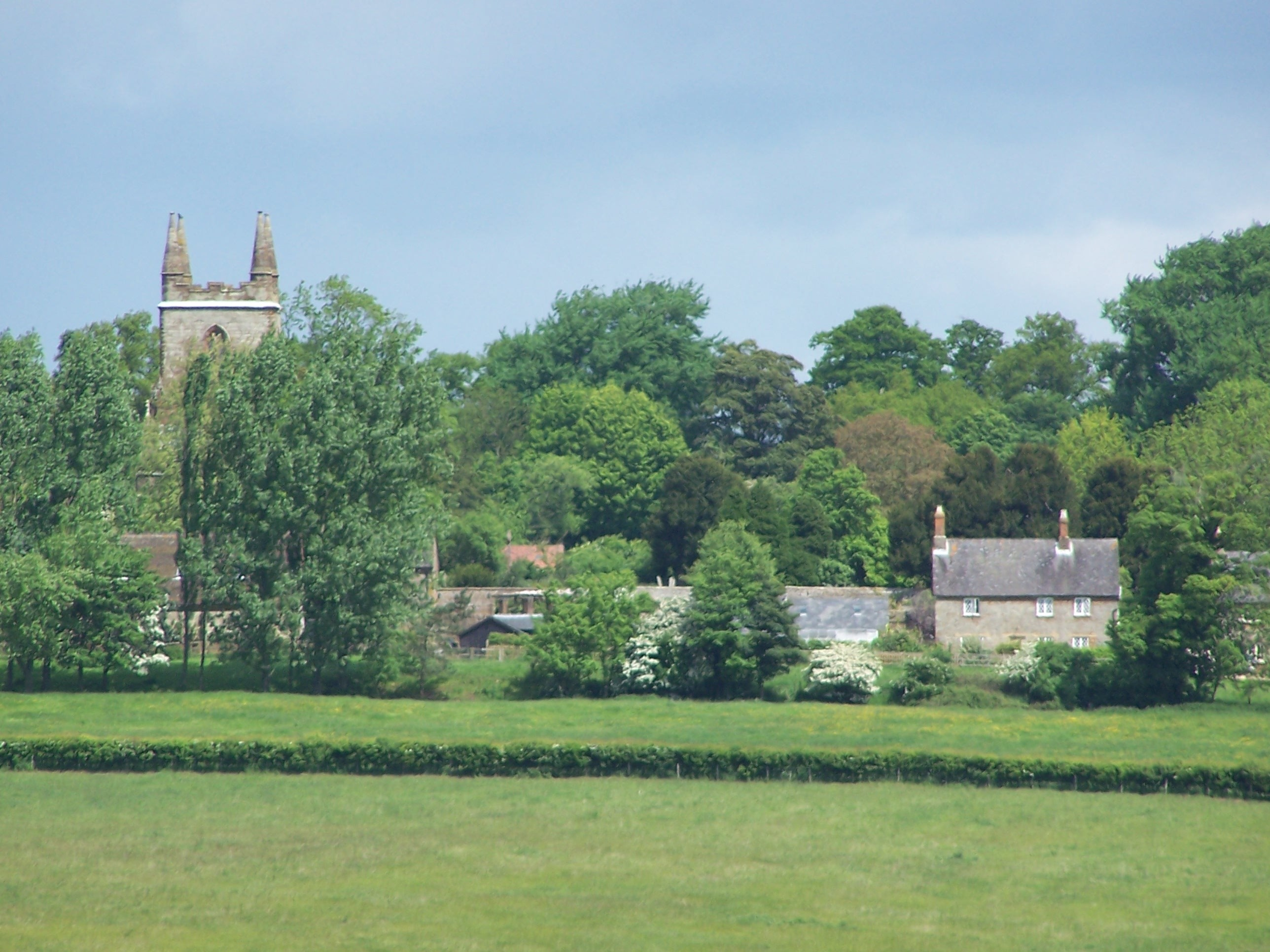
- View of Canons Ashby

- Location within Northamptonshire
- Population: 50 or less (2001)
- OS grid reference: SP577503
- Unitary authority: West Northamptonshire
- Ceremonial county: Northamptonshire
- Region: East Midlands
- Country: England
- Sovereign state: United Kingdom
- Post town: Daventry
- Postcode district: NN11
- Dialling code: 01327
- Police: Northamptonshire
- Fire: Northamptonshire
- Ambulance: East Midlands
- UK Parliament: Daventry

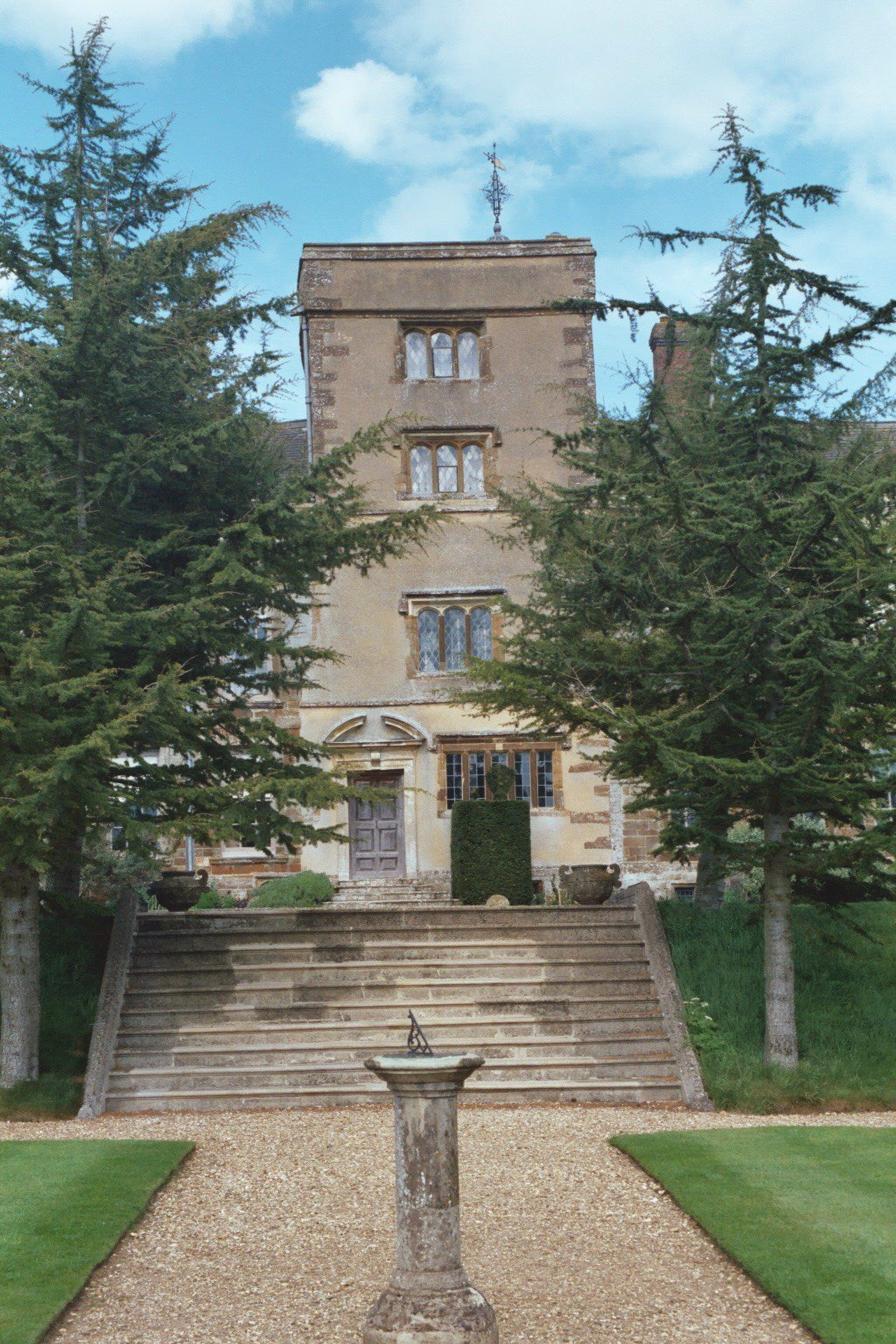
Canons Ashby House

Canons Ashby is a small village and civil parish in West Northamptonshire, England. The population of the village is included in the civil parish of Preston Capes.

Its most notable building is Canons Ashby House, a National Trust property. The parish church is a surviving fragment of Canons Ashby Priory.

It is situated 0.9 miles (1,400 m) from Moreton Pinkney. A railway station was located between the two villages, on the Stratford-upon-Avon and Midland Junction Railway (later part of the London Midland and Scottish Railway), but the station closed in April 1952.

The village is part of the Daventry constituency.
