= Titchmarsh, Northamptonshire =

Village in Northamptonshire, England

Coordinates: 52.404°N 0.495°W

Titchmarsh
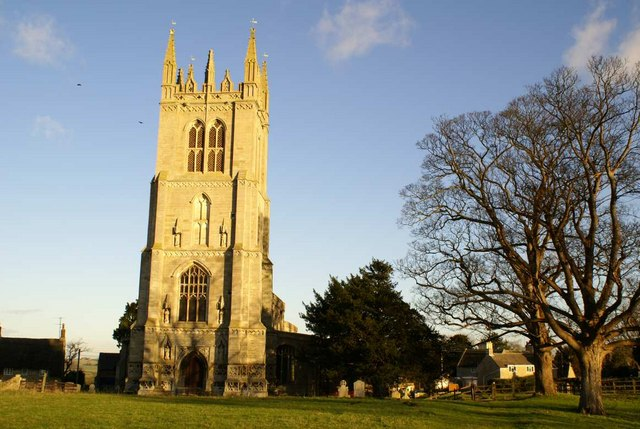

- Location within Northamptonshire
- Population: 603 (2021 Census)
- OS grid reference: TL0279
- Unitary authority: North Northamptonshire
- Ceremonial county: Northamptonshire
- Region: East Midlands
- Country: England
- Sovereign state: United Kingdom
- Post town: Kettering
- Postcode district: NN14
- Dialling code: 01832
- Police: Northamptonshire
- Fire: Northamptonshire
- Ambulance: East Midlands
- UK Parliament: Corby and East Northamptonshire
- Website: Titchmarsh Village

Titchmarsh is a village and civil parish in North Northamptonshire, England. The 2011 census recorded a parish population of 598 people, increasing to 603 in the 2021 Census.

== History ==
The village's name is thought to mean '"Young goat's marsh" or possibly "Ticcea's marsh".

Titchmarsh Castle was in fact a fortified manor house with a moat. Sir John Lovel received a licence to crenellate it in 1304 but it was in ruins by 1363.

The Church of England parish church of Saint Mary may originally have been 12th century, as a Norman doorway of that date survives in the chancel. The doorway is not in its original position but has been re-set. The north aisle and arcade are 13th century. The ornate Perpendicular Gothic bell-tower is notable. Dr. F.J. Allen, who was an authority on the notable late medieval Somerset towers, described St. Mary's tower as "the finest parish church tower in England outside Somerset". The tower, including the pinnacles, is 103 feet (31 metres) high. Many of St. Mary's church windows are also Perpendicular Gothic; with three, four or five lights.

As a boy the poet John Dryden lived here and probably received his first education in the village. There is a monument to him in St. Mary's parish church.

Brookside Farmhouse was built in 1628 and enlarged in the 18th century. It is believed to have been the family home of the Drydens. The Pickering almshouses were built in 1756.

== Amenities ==
The village has one public house, the Wheatsheaf. The Dog and Partridge has been converted into a residential property. A shop was officially opened on 21 September 2007 by the gardener and television presenter Alan Titchmarsh. The village has a primary school. Children from the parish travel to Oundle for secondary education.
