= Erasmus Dryden =

Erasmus Dryden may refer to:

- Sir Erasmus Dryden, 1st Baronet (died 1632), MP for Banbury
- Erasmus Dryden, son of the above and father of the poet John Dryden
- Sir Erasmus Henry Dryden, 5th Baronet (1669–1710), English Roman Catholic priest
- Sir Erasmus Dryden, 5th Baronet, of the Dryden baronets
- Sir Erasmus Dryden, 8th Baronet, of the Dryden baronets
