= Threnody =

Song, hymn or poem of mourning

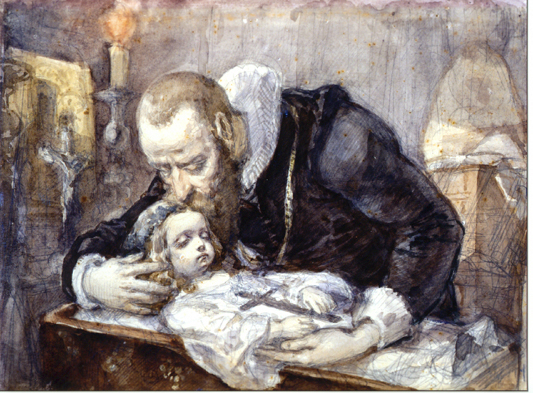
Jan Kochanowski with his dead daughter in a painting by Jan Matejko inspired by the poet's Threnodies

A threnody is a wailing ode, song, hymn or poem of mourning composed or performed as a memorial to a dead person. The term originates from the Greek word θρηνῳδία (threnoidia), from θρῆνος (threnos, "wailing") and ᾠδή (oide, "ode"), the latter ultimately from the Proto-Indo-European root *h₂weyd- ("to sing") that is also the precursor of such words as "ode", "tragedy", "comedy", "parody", "melody" and "rhapsody".

Similar terms include "dirge", "coronach", "lament" and "elegy". The Epitaphios Threnos is the lamentation chanted in the Eastern Orthodox Church on Holy Saturday. John Dryden commemorated the death of Charles II of England in the long poem Threnodia Augustalis, and Ralph Waldo Emerson wrote a "Threnody" in memory of his son.

== Examples ==
In written works:

- John McCrae's "In Flanders Fields"
- Countee Cullen's "Threnody for a Brown Girl"
- Bruce Dawe's poem "Homecoming"
- Ralph Waldo Emerson's "Threnody"
- Peter H. Gilmore's "Threnody for Humanity"
- A. E. Housman's "To an Athlete Dying Young"
- Jan Kochanowski's "Laments"
- Yusef Komunyakaa's "Sunset Threnody" in Dien Cai Dau (1988)
- Anna Stanisławska's Transaction, or an Account of the Life of an Orphan Girl told through Mournful Laments in the Year 1685

In classical music:

- Thomas J. Bergersen's "Threnody for Europe"
- Benjamin Britten's "Threnody for Albert Herring"
- Lou Harrison's Threnody for Carlos Chavez
- Toshio Hosokawa's Threnody: To the victims of the Tōhoku 3.11 Earthquake (2011)
- André Jolivet's "Chant de Linos" for flute and piano or flute, string trio and harp; described by the composer as "a form of threnody: a funeral lamentation interrupted by cries and dances" (1944, premiered 1 June 1945)
- Janis Crystal Lipzin's 2003–05 film Threnody
- Two "Thrénodies" from Franz Liszt's piano series Années de pèlerinage, set at the Villa d'Este
- Marian McPartland's "Threnody", written in memory of pianist Mary Lou Williams
- Krzysztof Penderecki's Threnody to the Victims of Hiroshima
- Gordon Rumson's Threnody for John Ogdon
- Bright Sheng's Nanjing! Nanjing!
- William Grant Still's Threnody: In Memory of Jean Sibelius
- Takashi Yoshimatsu’s Threnody to Toki
- "Threnody for Souls in Torment" by Robert Fripp

In jazz:

- "I Remember Clifford", written by Benny Golson to honor the memory of Clifford Brown
- "Goodbye Pork Pie Hat", written by Charles Mingus in memory of Lester Young
- "Memories of Lee Morgan", composed by Pharoah Sanders in memory of Lee Morgan. (Morgan had played on Dizzy Gillespie's recording of "I Remember Clifford".)
- "Bird's Lament" by Moondog, dedicated to Charlie Parker
- "Threnody for Sharon Tate", written by Freddie Hubbard and İlhan Mimaroğlu, from the 1971 album Sing Me a Song of Songmy
- "Lament for Booker", written by Horace Parlan in memory of Booker Ervin

In film and other music:

- "Threnody to Earth" by Dream Koala
- "Candle in the Wind" by Elton John and Bernie Taupin
- "Ohio" by Crosby, Stills, Nash & Young
- "Since I Lost You" by Genesis
- "Tears in Heaven" by Eric Clapton
- "Threnody" by Sebastian
- "Go Rest High on That Mountain" by Vince Gill
- "Fiddler's Green" by The Tragically Hip
- "Threnody" by Two Gallants
- Michael Jackson's "Little Susie" from the 1995 album HIStory: Past, Present and Future, Book I
- "Threnody for a Duck" from Peter and the Wolf by Jack Lancaster and Robin Lumley
- "Threnody" by Goldmund
- "In Trenodia" by Ville Valo

== See also ==
- Monody
- Sentimental ballad

== Bibliography ==
- Marcello Sorce Keller, "Expressing, Communicating, Sharing and Representing Grief and Sorrow with Organized Sound (Musings in Eight Short Sentences)", in Stephen Wild, Di Roy, Aaron Corn, and Ruth Lee Martin (eds.), Humanities Research: One Common Thread the Musical World of Lament, Australian National University, Vol. XIX (2013), no. 3, 3–14.
