= Richard Flecknoe =

English dramatist, poet and musician

Richard Flecknoe (c. 1600 – 1678) was an English dramatist, poet and musician. He is remembered for being made the butt of satires by Andrew Marvell in 1681 and by John Dryden in Mac Flecknoe in 1682.

== Life ==
Little is known of Flecknoe's life. He was probably of English birth, from Northamptonshire, though he may have been of Irish heritage. He was a Catholic and may have been ordained a lay-priest by the Jesuits while abroad. There was once a suggestion that he may have been the nephew of the Jesuit William Flecknoe or Flexney of Oxford, though there is no evidence of this. Much of his early life seems to have been spent outside England. He attended St Omer English Jesuit School from 1619 to 1624, where he may have taken part in the annual drama productions: in 1623 the play was Guy of Warwick. After ordination as a secular priest, he continued his studies at Watten in the Netherlands until 1636, when he returned to England, but he was disappointed to find little acceptance among English Catholics, who were not favourably disposed towards Jesuits: "he is none of ours" said the outspoken Catholic priest Anthony Champney. Andrew Marvell encountered him in Rome in 1645, from which period dates Marvell's satire "Flecknoe, an English Priest at Rome", although it was not published until 1681. His verse is charactised there as "hideous" and it is also mentioned that he performed on the lute.

== Works ==
Shortly after Flecknoe's return to England in 1636 his first play, now lost, was performed in London, possibly by Queen Henrietta's Men. Audiences derided it as "lascivious" and "scandalous", an assessment compounded by the knowledge that the author was an ordained priest.

He provides information about his travels in his collection of letters, Relation of Ten Years' Travels in Europe, Asia, Affrique, and America, completed around 1655. It contains correspondence with friends and patrons, beginning in 1640, and comprises accounts of the Ottoman dominions in Western Asia and of a voyage to and stay in Brazil. By 1653 he was in London, when he began publishing, and so far compromised his Catholic identity as to praise Oliver Cromwell in his The idea of His Highness Oliver, late Lord Protector, with certain brief reflexions on his life (1659).

In the field of drama his Ariadne...a dramatick piece for recitative music has a claim to be the first English opera, though the musical score (also composed by himself) is now lost. He also wrote a masque, The Marriage of Oceanus and Brittania; an unacted tragi-comedy, Erminia or The Fair and Vertuous Lady; and an unacted comedy, The Demoiselles à La Mode, the plot and subplot of which were taken from Molière’s Les Précieuses Ridicules and L'École des Femmes. One other production, Love’s Dominion, a pastoral with songs, was performed privately on the continent and later acted in Restoration England as Love's Kingdom.

Much of Flecknoe's later poetry was epigrammatic, in the line of Ben Jonson, with aristocratic addressees, which led one critic to remark that he was "better acquainted with the Nobility than with the Muses". Flecknoe explains his taste for the epigram in a dedicatory epistle which is itself epigrammatic and paradoxical: “I write chiefly to avoid idleness, and print to avoid the imputation; and as others do it to live after they are dead, I do it only not to be thought dead whilst I can live.” Its lightness is the reason he chooses this form, “who love not to take pains in anything, and rather affect a little negligence than too great curiosity”. The separate section of “Epigrams Divine and Moral” in the 1670 edition is, however, indicative of a religious seriousness persisting from his first publication some 44 years before in the devotional Hierothelamium.

He also took a moral stance in his prose works on English drama, and it may have been one of those that prompted Dryden to make him an object of satire in his Mac Flecknoe (1682), where he is depicted as the dying Monarch of Nonsense, bequeathing his title to the playwright Thomas Shadwell. The attack is unexpected, since Flecknoe had written an epigram in Dryden's praise and both were Catholics. Robert Southey, giving it as his opinion that "Flecknoe is by no means the despicable writer that we might suppose" from Dryden's vicious attack, accounted for it by supposing that Dryden was "offended at his invectives against the obscenity of the stage, feeling himself more notorious, if not more culpable than any of his rivals".

One of Dryden's later editors conjectured that "the plan of the poem required a dead author and Flecknoe suited the purpose". It might also have been that Dryden believed him to be author of a pamphlet signed "R. F." and published in 1668, in defence of Sir Robert Howard against Dryden in a controversy about rhyme and blank-verse, and was taking his revenge 14 years later. More recently, Paul Hammond accounts for it by the literary politics of the time and points out that many details in his depiction are drawn from the imagery of Flecknoe’s own poems.

== Bibliography ==
- Hierothelamium or the Heavenly Nuptialls of Our Blessed Saviour With a Pious Soule, 1626
- Miscellania or poems of all sorts with divers other pieces, 1653
- Ariadne deserted by Theseus and found and courted by Bacchus, 1654
- Love’s Dominion, 1654; reissued in 1664 as Love's Kingdom, prefaced with the essay A Short Discourse of the English Stage
- The Diarium... in burlesque rhyme or drolling verse, 1656
- Relation of Ten Years' Travels in Europe, Asia, Affrique, and America, privately printed 1656, reissued 1665
- Enigmatical Characters, 1658, revised 1665
- The Idea of his Highness Oliver, Late Lord Protector, 1659
- The Marriage of Oceanus and Brittania, masque, 1659
- Heroick Portraits…dedicate to his Majesty (prose and verse), 1660
- Erminia or The Fair and Vertuous Lady, tragi-comedy, 1661, 1665
- A Farrago of several pieces, 1666
- The Life of Tommaso the Wanderer, 1667
- The Demoiselles à La Mode, comedy, 1667
- Sir William Davenant’s voyage to the other world, with his adventures in the poets Elizium, a poetical fiction, 1668
- Epigrams of all sorts 1, 1669
- Epigrams of all sorts, rearranged with new additions, 1670
- Epigrams, 1671
- A collection of the choicest epigrams and characters, with omissions and additions, 1673; described as “being rather a new work than a new impression of the old”
- Euterpe Revived, epigrams made in the years 1672,3,4, in three books, 1675
