= Religio Laici =

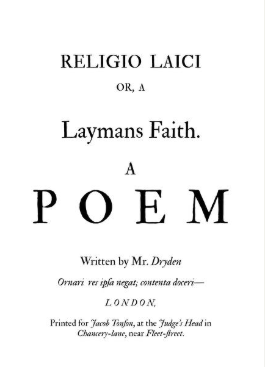
- Cover page of Religio Laici by John Dryden
- Author: John Dryden
- Language: English
- Genre: Religious poem
- Publisher: Jacob Tonson
- Publication date: 1682
- Publication place: United Kingdom
- Media type: Print (Hardback)

Religio Laici, Or A Layman's Faith (1682) is a poem written in heroic couplets by John Dryden. It was written in response to the publication of an English translation of the Histoire critique due vieux testament by the French cleric Father Richard Simon. Simon's book applied detailed criticism to the textual history of the Bible and argued that, given the compromised nature of much of the Bible, Christians would do better to base their faith on the history and traditions of the Roman Catholic Church.

The tendency of Simon's book was to undermine Protestantism, which prioritises the authority of the Bible over the traditions and rituals of the Catholic Church, and so Dryden set out in Religio Laici to address the issues raised by Simon's book, along with other religious issues of his times such as Deism, in order to assert the validity of the teachings of the Church of England.

== Sections ==
Religio Laici consists of 462 lines of consecutive rhyming couplets. Although it is not divided by breaks or headings into parts or sections, Dryden added notes in the margins to indicate the topics and issues addressed in each section of the poem. These are (in the original spelling):

- Opinions of the several sects of Philosophers concerning the Summum Bonum
- System of Deism
- Of Reveal'd Religion
- Objection of the Deist
- The Objection answer'd
- Digression to the Translator of Father Simon's Critical History of the Old Testament
- Of the infallibility of Tradition, in General
- Objection in behalf of Tradition; urg'd by Father Simon
- The Second Objection
- Answer to the Objection

== Excerpt ==
Dryden concludes the poem with a plea for moderation in all things including religious debate. On this subject, more than all others, it behoves each citizen to 'curb' their 'private reason' (or opinions) rather than disturb 'the public peace'. It is notable that the climax of this long series of complex religious arguments is social rather than religious: 'Common quiet is Mankind's concern'.

And after hearing what our Church can say,
If still our Reason runs another way,
That private Reason ’tis more Just to curb,
Than by Disputes the publick Peace disturb.
For points obscure are of small use to learn:
But Common quiet is Mankind’s concern.

— John Dryden, Religio Laici, lines 445-450

== The Hind and the Panther ==
Five years after publishing Religio Laici Dryden drastically changed his position and converted to Roman Catholicism. He published a long and complex allegorical poem in three parts, The Hind and the Panther (1687) to explain his conversion. The fact that he converted a few years into the rule of the Catholic king, James II, prompted much scorn and derision from contemporaries.
