= John Oldham (poet) =

English poet and translator (1653–1683)

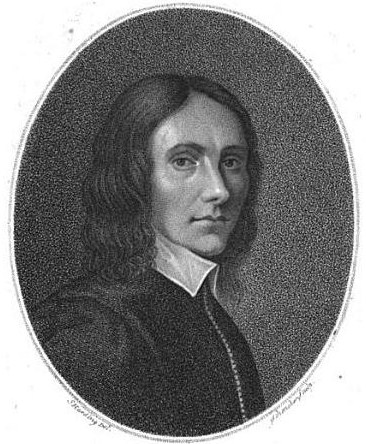
- Born: 9 August 1653; Shipton Moyne, Gloucestershire, England
- Died: 9 December 1683 (aged 30); Holme Pierrepont Hall, Nottinghamshire, England
- Occupations: Satirical poet and translator

John Oldham (9 August 1653 – 9 December 1683) was an English satirical poet and translator. John Dryden, England's first Poet Laureate, was one of his admirers and upon his death wrote an elegy "To the Memory of Mr. Oldham".

== Life and work ==
Oldham was born in Shipton Moyne, Gloucestershire, the son of John Oldham, a non-conformist minister, and grandson of John Oldham the staunch anti-papist rector of Shipton Moyne and before that of Long Newnton in Wiltshire. He was educated first at Tetbury Grammar School, then at St Edmund Hall, Oxford, where the Principal was Thomas Tully, an ex-headmaster from Oldham's school at Tetbury. Tully was "a person of severe morals, puritanically inclin'd and a strict Calvinist".

Oldham received a B. A. degree in May 1674. He became an usher at the Whitgift School in Croydon, Surrey (now in Greater London), a position that was poorly paid, monotonous and left little time for him to compose poetry; his discontent at the time was expressed in these lines from one of his satires – "To a friend about to leave University":

But who would be to the vile drudgery bound
Where there so small encouragement is found?
Where you for recompense for all your pains,
Shall hardly reach a common fiddler's gains?
For when you've toiled and laboured all you can,
To dung and cultivate a barren brain,
A Dancing-Master shall be better paid,
Tho' he instructs the Heels and you the Head.

By then his poetry had already been published, and he received an unexpected visit at the school from an illustrious party including the Earl of Rochester, Charles Sedley and the Earl of Dorset (part of the "Merry Gang", as Andrew Marvell called them), who wished to express their appreciation of his work.

Oldham left the Whitgift School in 1678 and took up the post of tutor to the grandsons of a retired judge, Sir Edward Thurland, in the vicinity of Reigate in Surrey. It was during this period that he composed and had published his satires against the Jesuits, at a time when popular anger was being stirred up against Catholics in England by the "Popish Plot". In 1680, he became, for a short time, tutor to the son of Sir William Hicks, through whom he made the acquaintance of the notable physician Dr. Richard Lower. Under Lower's influence, Oldham took up the study of medicine for a year, before returning to poetry.

Oldham settled in London and was introduced to John Dryden, England's first Poet Laureate, with whom he became close friends. He entered fashionable society (said to be centred on Will's Coffee House), and was approached by the Earl of Kingston-upon-Hull to be a private chaplain to his household. Oldham turned down the post but did accept the hospitality of the Earl at his seat at Holme Pierrepont Hall in Nottinghamshire.

== Style ==
Oldham was a satirist who imitated the classical Satires of Juvenal. His best-known works are "A Satire Upon a Woman Who by Her Falsehood and Scorn Was the Death of My Friend", written in 1678, and "A Satire against Virtue", written in 1679. During his lifetime, his poetry was published anonymously. His translations of Juvenal were published after his death. Oldham has been criticised for weaknesses in his rhyming and rhythm; but the critic Ken Robinson (1980) notes, "Oldham chose the rugged style of most of his satires: it was not imposed upon him by incapacity or carelessness."

== Death ==
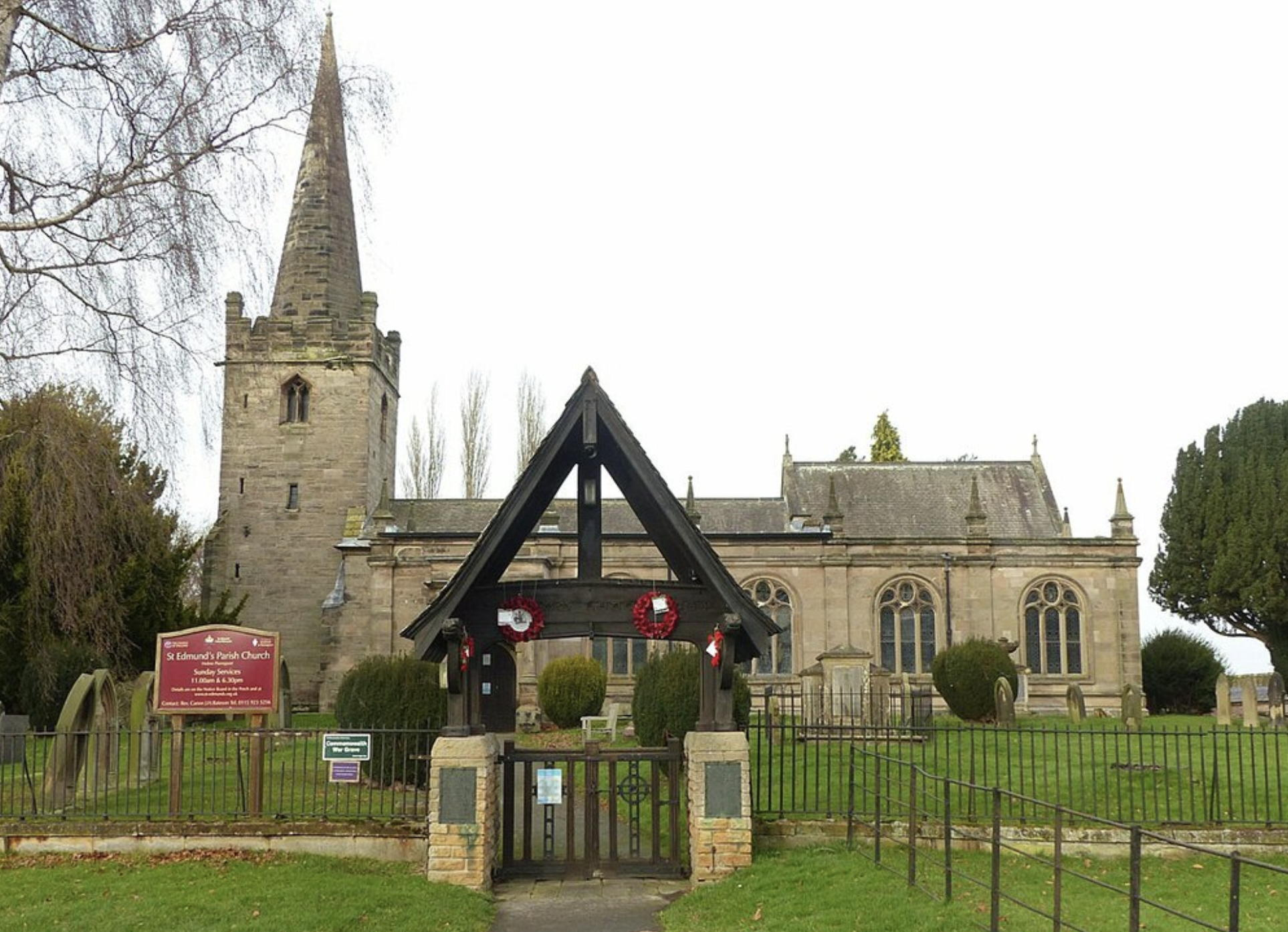
St Edmund's Church, Holme Pierrepont

It was here that Oldham died of smallpox at Holme Pierrepont, on 9 December 1683, aged only 30. He may also have suffered from tuberculosis during his lifetime. The Earl of Kingston-upon-Hull had a monument, possibly designed by Grinling Gibbons, erected over Oldham's grave in St Edmund's Church, Holme Pierrepont.

John Dryden was one of Oldham's admirers and in a 1684 elegy "To the Memory of Mr. Oldham" lamented not having met him earlier and that he had died too young.

== Bibliography ==
- Thompson, Edward. The compositions in verse and prose of Mr. John Oldham, to which are added memoirs of his life (in 3 vols, 1770).
- Cibber, Theophilus. The Lives of the Poets of Great Britain and Ireland : to the time of Dean Swift (Volume 2) (1753), pp. 337–343.
- Bell, Robert (ed.). The poems of John Oldham (London: Charles Griffin, 1871).
- Lee, Sidney, ed. (1895). "Oldham, John (1653–1683)" . Dictionary of National Biography. Vol. 42. London: Smith, Elder & Co. pp. 108–110.
