= John Dryden (writer, died 1701) =

English writer (1667/8–1701)

John Dryden (1667/8–1701) was an English writer. He was the second son of the poet John Dryden (1631–1700) and was educated at Westminster School and University College, Oxford. He translated Juvenal's fourteenth satire, and wrote one comedy.

== Biography ==
John Dryden, born in Charlton, London, in 1667 or 1668, was the second son of John Dryden the poet, and his wife Elizabeth, daughter of Thomas Howard, 1st Earl of Berkshire. He followed his elder brother Charles to Westminster School, and was elected to Christ Church in 1685. His father preferred to place him under the care of Obadiah Walker, the Roman Catholic master of University College.

Dryden went to Rome with his elder brother. He translated the fourteenth satire of Juvenal for his father's version, and wrote the comedy Husband his own Cuckold, performed in 1696, with a prologue by his father, and an epilogue by William Congreve. An account of a tour in Italy and Malta, made by Dryden in 1700 in company with a Mr. Cecil, was published in 1776. Dryden died in Rome on 28 January 1701.
