= Threnodia Augustalis =

1685 poem by John Dryden

The Threnodia Augustalis is a 517-line occasional poem written by John Dryden to commemorate the death of Charles II in February 1685. The poem was "rushed into print" within a month. The title is a reference to the classical threnody, a poem of mourning, and to Charles as a "new Augustus" (see Augustan literature). It is subtitled "A Funeral-Pindarique Poem Sacred to the Happy Memory of King Charles II", and is one of several poems on the subject published at the time (see 1685 in poetry).

Although not one of Dryden's better-known works, the Threnodia is cited twice in The Oxford Dictionary of Quotations, for "Mute and magnificent, without a tear" (stanza 2), and a couplet expressing nationalist sentiment (stanza 10):

Freedom which in no other Land will thrive,
Freedom an English Subject's sole Prerogative,

— lines 300–301

The Threnodia is marked by "the stately enthusiasm of the time", but also lends itself to charges of bathos. The English critic George Saintsbury noted that the poem "is not exempt from the faults of its kind; but it has merits which for that kind are decidedly unusual", and singles out a stanza that "adroitly at once praises and satirizes Charles's patronage of literary men" for its quality.

As indicated by its subtitle, the poem exhibits metrical complexities in imitation of a pindaric ode, that is, the structurally intricate poetry of the Greek lyric poet Pindar. The stanzas are irregular, and both line length and the rhyming pattern vary. Early editions misunderstood the pindaric vagaries of the Threnodia and are sometimes erratic in using indentation to indicate metrical units. In its first year alone, the poem went through three London editions and one Dublin edition.
