= To the Memory of Mr. Oldham =

1684 poem by John Dryden

To the Memory of Mr. Oldham (1684) is an elegy written by John Dryden (1631–1700), commemorating the death of the poet John Oldham.

== Poem ==
Farewell, too little, and too lately known,
Whom I began to think and call my own:
For sure our souls were near allied, and thine
Cast in the same poetic mold with mine.
One common note on either lyre did strike,
And knaves and fools we both abhorred alike.
To the same goal did both our studies drive;
The last set out the soonest did arrive.
Thus Nisus fell upon the slippery place,
While his young friend performed and won the race.
O early ripe! to thy abundant store
What could advancing age have added more?
It might (what nature never gives the young)
Have taught the numbers of thy native tongue.
But satire needs not those, and wit will shine
Through the harsh cadence of a rugged line.
A noble error, and but seldom made,
When poets are by too much force betrayed.
Thy generous fruits, though gathered ere their prime,
Still showed a quickness; and maturing time
But mellows what we write to the dull sweets of rhyme.
Once more, hail and farewell; farewell, thou young,
But ah too short, Marcellus of our tongue;
Thy brows with ivy, and with laurels bound;
But fate and gloomy night encompass thee around.

— John Dryden

== Summary ==
"In this elegy, John Dryden laments the death of John Oldham (1653–1683), the young poet whose Satires upon the Jesuits (1681), which Dryden admired, were written in 1679, before Dryden's major satires appeared (see line 8)." Dryden laments that he has made Oldham's acquaintance much too late and that Oldham died much too young. Their poetry and their thinking (i.e. their souls) were very similar ("For sure our souls were near allied, and thine / Cast in the same poetic mold with mine."). They both disliked "knaves and fools" which are "[o]bjects of satire." They both had the same goals. Oldham is compared to Nisus, who "on the point of winning a footrace, slipped in a pool of blood" in Vergil's Aeneid. Dryden then asks how Oldham's "to thy abundant store / What could advancing age have added more?" and is sure that his verse could have been perfected, but this would not have been required as "satire needs not those [perfect metrics], and wit will shine / Through the harsh cadence of a rugged line." Here, "Dryden repeats the Renaissance idea that the satirist should avoid smoothness and affect rough meters […]." Moreover, Dryden points out that this would be "A noble error, and but seldom made, / When poets are by too much force betrayed." As Oldham was still young his "generous fruit […] / Still showed a quickness," but Dryden finds comfort in the fact that "maturing time / But mellows what we write to the dull sweets of rhyme." The poem is concluded with an echo of "the famous words that conclude Catullus's elegy to his brother: 'Atque in perpetuum, frater, ave atque vale' (And forever, brother, hail and farewell!)." Marcellus, who is mentioned in line 23, is "[t]he nephew of Augustus, adopted by him as his successor. After winning military fame as a youth, [Marcellus] died at the age of twenty".
