= Shipton Moyne =

Village in Gloucestershire, England

Coordinates: 51°36′N 2°10′W

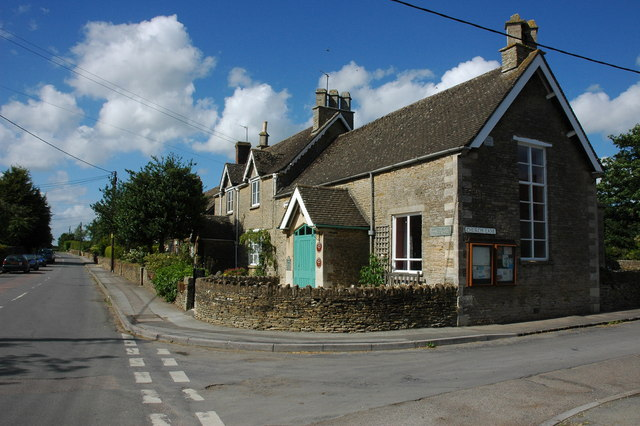
The village hall, Shipton Moyne

Shipton Moyne is a village and civil parish in the Cotswold district of Gloucestershire, England, approximately 105 miles west of London. Its nearest towns are Tetbury (3 miles north), also in Gloucestershire, and Malmesbury (3 miles southeast) in Wiltshire. The parish population at the 2021 census was 288.

== History ==
The name Shipton, recorded in 1086, indicates the early importance of sheep-farming in the parish economy; the affix Moyne, recorded from 1287, was acquired when the manor was owned by the Moyne family.

The Victoria County History provides a detailed account of the history of the parish from the eleventh to the twentieth century.

The Fosse Way forms part of the parish boundary and also the county boundary with Wiltshire. Shipton Moyne was one of several parishes which were transferred from Wiltshire to Gloucestershire in 1930.

== Sites of interest ==
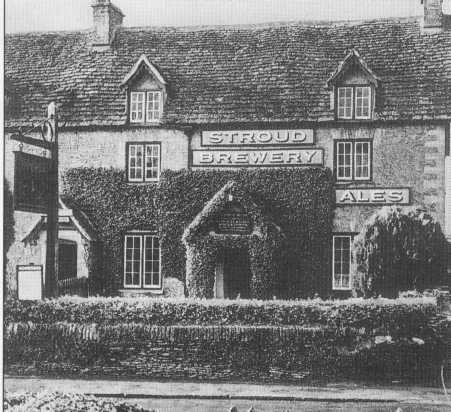
The Cat and Custard Pot c.1950

=== The Cat and Custard Pot (Public House) ===
In 1661 two parishioners were keeping unlicensed alehouses and in 1755 two victualers were licensed. A beerhouse on the west side of the village street was recorded in the early 19th century and was presumably occupied by the beer-retailers listed in the parish later. Apparently still unnamed in 1891, it was called the Estcourt Arms in 1927 but by 1931 the name had been changed to the Cat and Custard Pot.

The pub's unusual name is said to originate from the book Handley Cross or Mr Jorrocks's Hunt by Robert Smith Surtees:

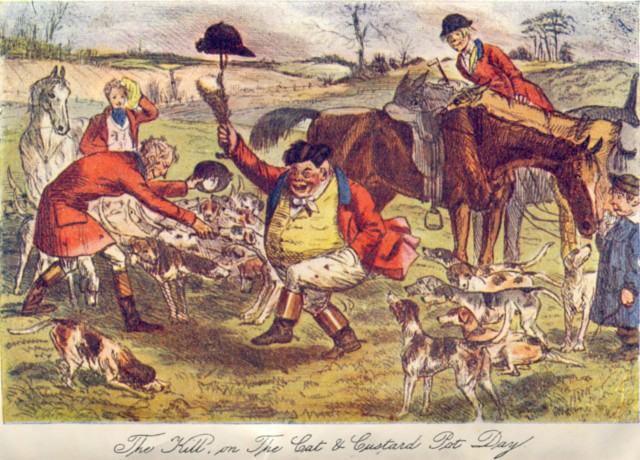
The Kill on The Cat and Custard Pot Day

"when they reached the meet—the sign of the “Cat and Custard-pot,” on the Muswell Road, they found an immense assemblage"

=== St. John the Baptist's Church ===
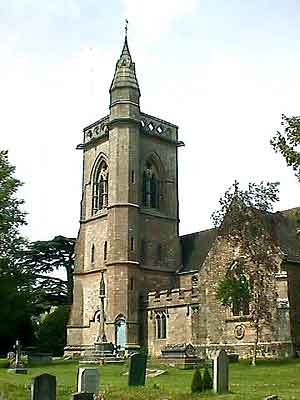
Shipton Moyne Church

==== History ====
The present Church of England parish church, erected in 1864, replaced a church with a record going back to Norman times. Part of the north aisle and the porch were preserved, together with the Eastcourt Chapel on the south side and part of the nave, the central tower being demolished and the nave extended to form an enlarged chancel. A south aisle was constructed with a new tower at the south-west corner providing a belfry and entrance. The church was designated as Grade II* listed in 1954.

The list of rectors goes back to 1297; in the 19th century the church was served by curates. The former church is recorded in engravings and photographs.

Alexander Hore-Ruthven, 1st Lord Gowrie and his wife are buried in the churchyard. Lord Gowrie was the 20th Governor of South Australia from 15/05/1928 to 26/04/1934. From 15/01/1935 to 23/01/1936 he was the 27th Governor of New South Wales and from 23/01/1936 to 30/01/1945 he was Governor-General of Australia; to date the longest-serving governor general.

==== Parish records ====
The records in 1086 tell us that there were 38 inhabitants, with the population gradually increasing to 90 communicants in 1551, 26 families in 1563, a population of 420 in 1881 and finally of 300 in 1983.

==== Architecture ====
T.H. Wyatt (1807–1880) was a cousin of the architects James and Jeffrey Wyatt (and brother of Matthew Digby Wyatt). He was an eminent architect and had a large practice that included work on many Wiltshire churches owing to his patronage by the Beauforts. His design of St. John the Baptist's Church is a good example of a High Victorian design, if bearing little relation to its predecessor.

==== Bells ====
Five bells were recorded in 1680 and a further bell was added in 1865: a treble weighing five hundredweight. One tenor bell was cast in the mid-fifteenth century in London. Weighing fourteen hundredweight it was dedicated to The Virgin Mary. Two were cast in Bristol by Roger Purden in 1620, one weighing 6cwt. and the other 7cwt. Two were cast in Gloucester by Abraham Rudhall in 1704, one weighing 8cwt. and the other 10cwt.

In 1962, at the expense of Col. St. George of Hillcourt, two bells were re-cast by John Taylor of Loughborough; the 1620 bell weighing 7cwt. and the 1704 bell weighing 5cwt. All were rehung on a strengthened frame and re-dedicated. The total weight of the bells being some two and a half tons.

==== Organ ====
Built by Bevington and Sons of Soho, London and restored by Osmond & Co. of Taunton in 1995, the organ has one manual electrically operated blower. The original handle operated manual blower is still present in the vestry.

==== Clock ====
Facing west in the tower, the clock was made by John Smith & Sons of Derby in 1887. It strikes on the hour and half hour. The face was restored in memory of Lt. Cmdr. J.T.B. Birch, a past churchwarden who for several years gave his time to maintaining the church.

==== Decorations, monuments and tombs ====
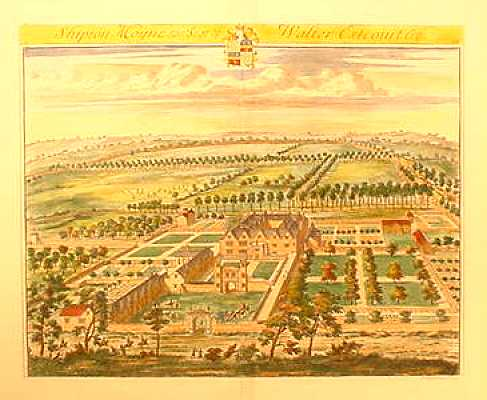
'Shipton Moyne, the Seat of Walter Estcourt Esq.' by Jan Kip and Leonard Knyff, 1709

- In the Chancel there is a stained glass window in memory of Walter Hodges and his wife Mary and another of Thomas Gildart Golightly and his wife Gertrude. The latter made and designed by Bryams in 1905.
- In the north aisle there is a stained glass window in memory of William Frederic Hamilton Gratman made and designed by Ward Hughes in 1862. In the west, another in memory of Thomas Henry Sutton Sotheron Estcourt by Taylor (late O'Connor) 1877. There is also a small stained glass window in the porch to Major General B.B. Estcourt.
- A large decorated tomb with Thomas Estcourt (1599) and his wife and family and a later tomb of Sir Thomas Estcourt (1624) and his wife. The latter tomb was transferred from Lasborough church in 1825 with two kneeling marble figures lost in the process.
- There are recumbent figures of two knights and a lady believed to be of the Le Moyne family (originally Le Moigne) and dating from the fourteenth century.
- The font is in memory of Edward Dugdale Bucknall Estcourt. There is no trace left of the original Norman octagonal font recorded in 1843.
- On the outside of the South Chapel there is built into the wall a stone carved plaque with the initials of Edmund Estcourt dated 1749.
- A Caen stone and marble reredos presented by Canon Golightly may be found in the chancel.
- The pulpit was carved by Barbetti of Florence; it depicts scenes from the life of John the Baptist.

=== The Fosse Way ===
The Fosse Way, the only Roman road in Britain to retain its original Latin name – most others having been renamed by the Saxons – passes through Shipton Moyne. Its route takes it from Exeter (Isca Dumnoniorum) in southwest England, to Lincoln (Lindum) in the East Midlands, via Bath (Aquae Sulis), Cirencester (Corinium) and Leicester (Ratae Coritanorum).

== Notable people ==
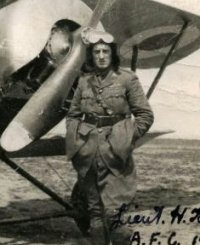
Lieutenant Harry Taylor

- King Charles III has a residence at Highgrove, Gloucestershire, near Shipton Moyne
- John Oldham (1653–1683), poet, was born in Shipton Moyne
- Lieutenant Harry Taylor (1889–1918), a First World War pilot with both the Australian Flying Corps and the Royal Flying Corps, died in an aerial collision during a training exercise over Shipton Moyne
