= Anna Stanisławska =

Polish author and poet (1651–1701)

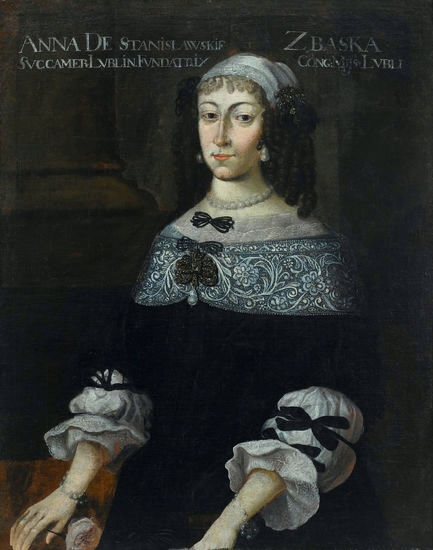
- Anna Stanisławska
- Born: 1651
- Died: 2 June 1701 (aged 51)
- Writing career
- Notable work: Transakcja albo opisanie całego życia jednej sieroty przez żałosne treny od tejże samej pisane roku 1685
- Literary movement: Polish Baroque, Sarmatism

Anna Stanisławska (1651 – 2 June 1701) was a Polish writer and poet known for her sole work, Transakcja albo opisanie całego życia jednej sieroty przez żałosne treny od tejże samej pisane roku 1685 (Transaction, or a Description of the Whole Life of an Orphan Girl through Doleful Laments Written by the Same in 1685).

The unpublished manuscript was discovered in a public library in St. Petersburg, Russia, nearly two centuries later, in 1890, by Slavic studies professor Aleksander Brückner, who declared Stanisławska the earliest known Polish woman poet. The work was finally printed in 1935.

== Life ==
=== Early life ===
Piława coat of arms

Stanisławska was born in 1651 to Michal Stanisławski, a military commander and one-time governor of Kiev Province, and Krystyna Borkowa Szyszkowska (née Niszczycka).

Stanisławska was a member of the szlachta, the noble class, and her family bore the Piława coat of arms, connecting them to the powerful Potocki and Zebrzydowski families.

Following the death of her mother when she was three, Stanisławska was sent to a cloister near Kraków to be educated by Dominican nuns. Her maternal great aunt, Gryzelda Dominika Zebrzydowska, was the prioress there until she died of the bubonic plague, at which point Stanisławska was placed in the guardianship of her maternal grandfather.

=== "Aesop" episode ===
Stanisławska's young brother Piotr died in 1667, prompting her father to bring her back home. He had remarried in 1663, to Anna Potocka Kazanowska-Sluszka, and under pressure from his new wife, he arranged his daughter's marriage to Jan Kazimierz Warszycki. Warszycki had powerful connections, being the son of Stanislaw Warszycki, a senator and Castellan of Kraków, but he was also mentally disabled, physically abusive, and completely uninterested in Stanisławska sexually. In Transaction Stanisławska refers to him almost exclusively as "Aesop" for his ugly appearance, but ultimately she takes pity on him as the "slave" of his conniving and "tyrannical" father. Much of the piece recounts her misery in her marriage to Warszycki and her attempts to secure a divorce from him. Shortly before their wedding she became deathly ill, and the marriage ceremony was conducted in her home rather than in the church, as was traditional.

After her father's death in 1669, Stanisławska gained ownership of the family's estate. Her great uncle John III Sobieski, who would become king of Poland in 1674, became her new guardian. With his assistance, Stanisławska repaired her relationship with her stepmother and fled to a convent, claiming sanctuary from her husband and his family. She sought an annulment in court, which was finally granted around 1670. Her stepmother's testimony, in which she claimed that she and Stanislawska's father had forced the girl into marriage against her will, was crucial in securing the annulment.

=== Later life ===
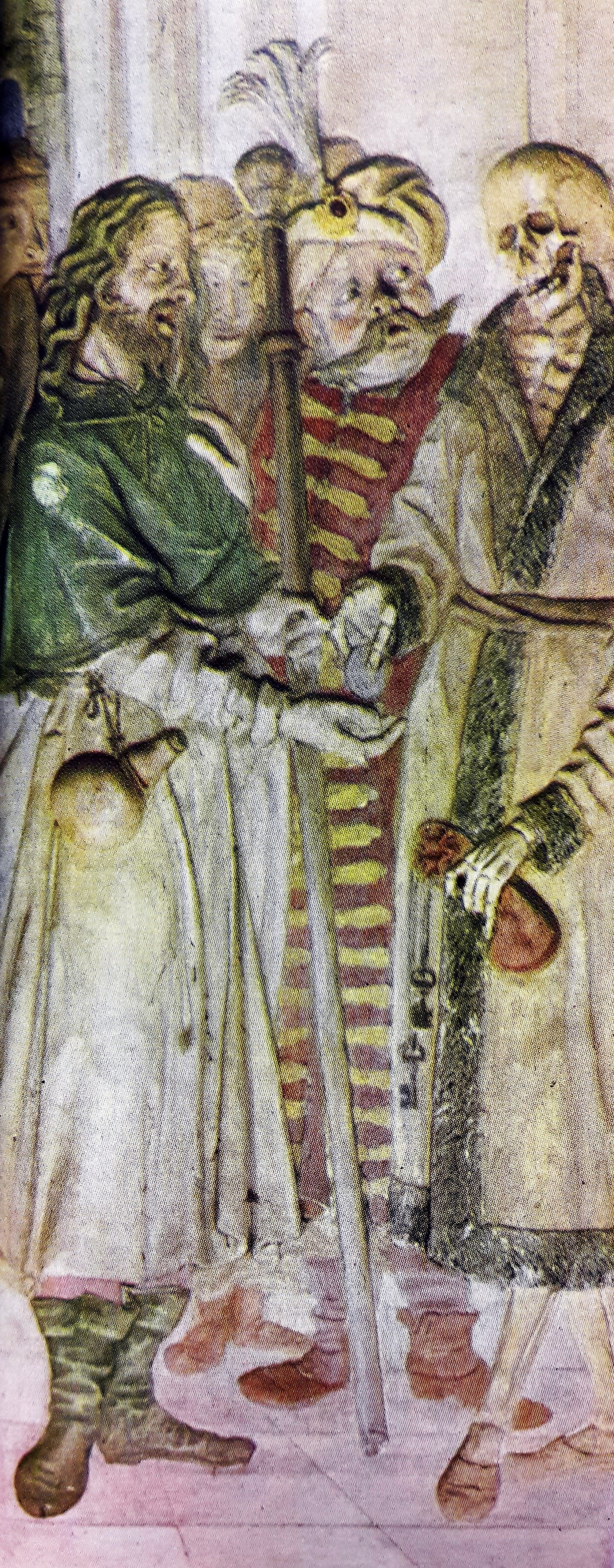
Death and Saint Roch, one of several stucco decorations in the "Chapel of Good Death" in Tarłów, probably commissioned by Anna Stanisławska

Once divorced, Stanisławska swiftly married a distant relative, Jan Zbigniev Oleśnicki. According to Transaction, they were happily married until Oleśnicki's death from cholera in 1675 while on a military expedition during the Second Polish–Ottoman War. In 1677 she married again, to Jan Boguslaw Zbąski. In 1683, Zbąski died from an injury he sustained at the Battle of Vienna during the Third Polish–Ottoman War. It was at this point that Stanisławska began writing Transaction. Little is known of Stanisławska's life after 1685. At some point in the 1690s, she was sued in court after leading a group of servants and villagers against the new owners of a neighboring estate, which had been seized due to unpaid debts. She donated much of her wealth to various missionary groups and to the Piarist monks at Dunajgrod, leaving her estate to the latter in her will. She died on 2 June 1701, in Kurów.

== Transaction ==
The Transaction, or a Description of the Whole Life of an Orphan Girl through Doleful Laments Written by the Same in 1685, is an autobiographical (according to the author) poem describing Stanisławska's life and three marriages between 1668 and 1685. It comprises 77 threnodies, or laments, each containing a varying number of eight-line stanzas. It also contains a 22-line introduction "To the Reader"; a 12-line "Conclusion – to the Reader of This Book"; and numerous marginal glosses.

It is a Polish Baroque piece, characterized by dramatism, swells of emotion, and strict form. It also reflects Stanisławska's intense Catholicism, typical of the period's Sarmatism and reflective of her convent education.

Stanisławska's rhymes follow an AABBCCDD scheme, known as Częstochowian rhymes, which were unpopular with Polish poets and were thus an unusual choice.

Her primary inspiration was likely Jan Kochanowski's Laments (also known as Threnodies), written in 1580 on the death of his two-year-old daughter. Like Kochanowski, Stanisławska personifies and addresses Fortune, in addition to referencing a Christian god. She may also have drawn for her narrative upon the traditions of "courtly theatre".

Ożarska notes that while describing Stanisławska's life and the death of her three husbands, the manuscript does not mention any of the principals by name; in fact, the title page credits the authorship of the book to "Jesus, Mary, and Joseph". The names of the principals are recorded in the author's glosses. Thus Ożarska believes that the work is not meant to be autobiographical, but a depiction of 17th-century Polish culture, including "courtship, betrothal, wedding or funeral customs which are depicted in considerable detail".

For reasons unknown, Transaction was never published, and was not discovered until 1890, when the manuscript was found in a St. Petersburg public library by Slavic studies professor Aleksander Brückner. Brückner declared Stanisławska to be Poland's first woman poet in his 1893 study "The First Polish Woman Writer and Her Rhymed Autobiography". Later research, however, has disproved Brückner's assertion. Even after Transaction was published in 1935, Stanisławska was surpassed in fame by her contemporaries Elżbieta Drużbacka and Antonina Niemiryczowa, both historically and in the Polish literary canon.

Transaction was only able to be published after years of negotiations with St. Petersburg, which were complicated by the Russian Revolution in 1917. The work was finally sent to Poland as part of a larger exchange in 1935, and edited and published in that year by Ida Kotowa. Though Stanisławska's identity as the author was in question for a time, Kotowa included in her edition a 1699 letter written by Stanisławska, which matched the handwriting in Transaction. Stanisławska's original manuscript was either destroyed or lost during the Warsaw Uprising in 1944.

=== Criticism ===
In her introduction to Transaction, Ida Kotowa heavily critiqued Stanisławska's clarity and imagination, writing that the marginal notes often had to be relied upon for the "true sense of a stanza" and that her rhymes were "usually … strained, and sometimes simply forced". Brückner agreed, repeatedly calling the poetry "poor" or even "terrible", but going on to praise Stanisławska's "feminine wit". Though later scholars were more forgiving, calling Transaction "a sincere and artistically valuable confession" as well as "detailed and lifelike", ultimately the work has been celebrated more for its social implications than for its style. It was the "first strictly personal woman's memoir for the readers' enlightenment and admonition" in the region, and one of many recently discovered "'other' and certainly 'forgotten' voices of the Baroque era".

== See also ==
- Jan Andrzej Morsztyn
- List of Poles
- Wacław Potocki

== Sources ==
- Ożarska, Magdalena (2012). "Combining a Lament With a Verse Memoir: Anna Stanisławska's Transaction (1685)". Slavia – Časopis pro Slovanskou Filologii. 81 (4).
- Peretz, Maya (1993). "In Search of the First Polish Woman Author". The Polish Review. 38 (4): 469–483. JSTOR 25778749.
- Stanisławska, Anna (2016). Orphan Girl: A Transaction, or an Account of the Entire Life of an Orphan Girl by way of Plaintful Threnodies in the Year 1685. The Other Voice in Early Modern Europe: The Toronto Series. Vol. 45. Toronto, Ontario: Iter Academic Press. ISBN 9780866985475.
