= Laments (Kochanowski) =

1580 book of poems by Jan Kochanowski

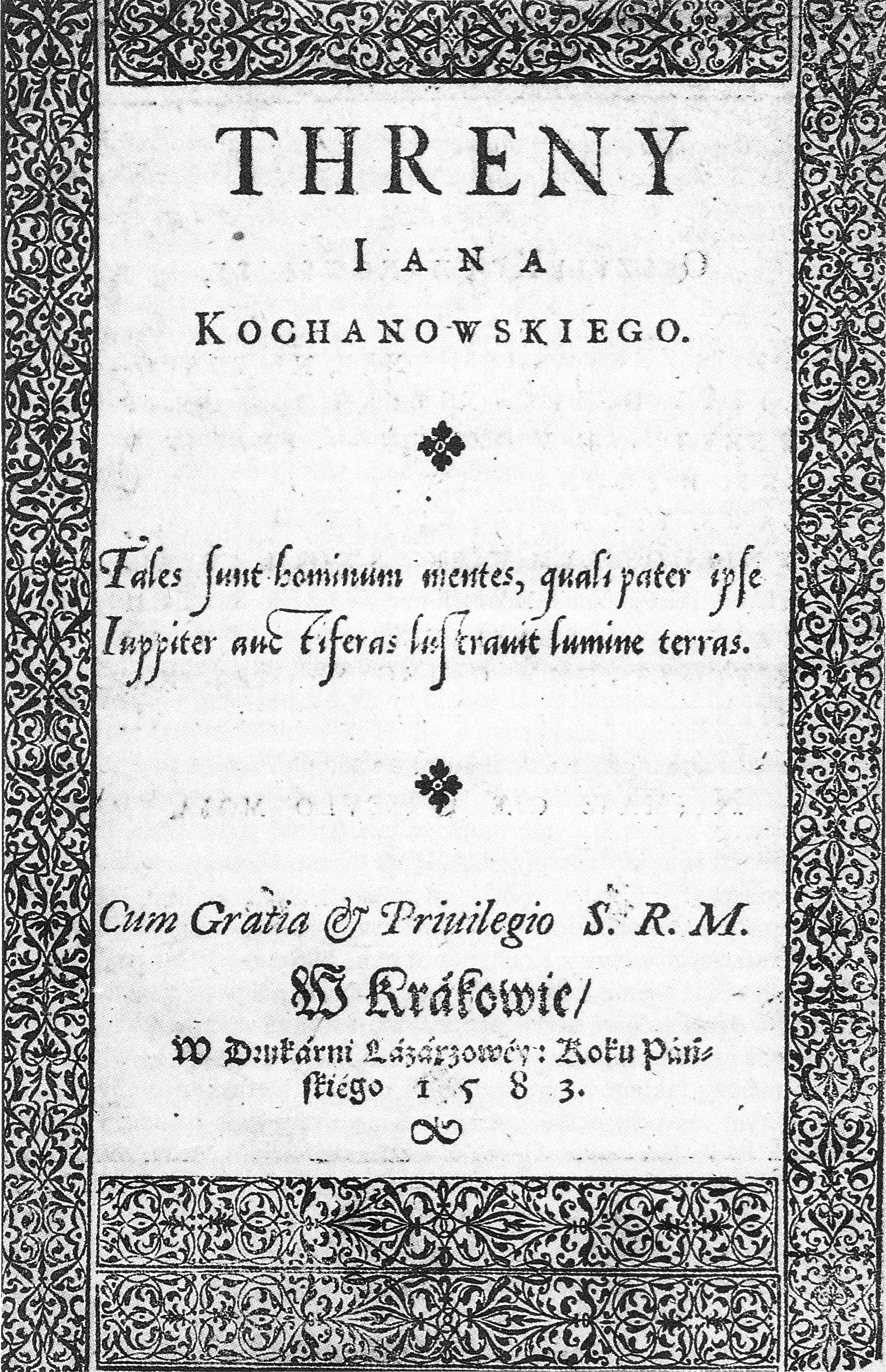
- Title page of Laments, 1583 printing
- Author: Jan Kochanowski
- Original title: Treny
- Language: Polish
- Genre: poetry
- Publisher: Drukarnia Łazarzowa
- Publication date: 1580
- Publication place: Poland

The Laments (also Lamentations or Threnodies; Polish: Treny, originally spelled Threny) is a series of nineteen threnodies (elegies) written in Polish by Jan Kochanowski and published in 1580. They are a high point of Polish Renaissance literature, and one of Kochanowski's signal achievements.

== Composition ==
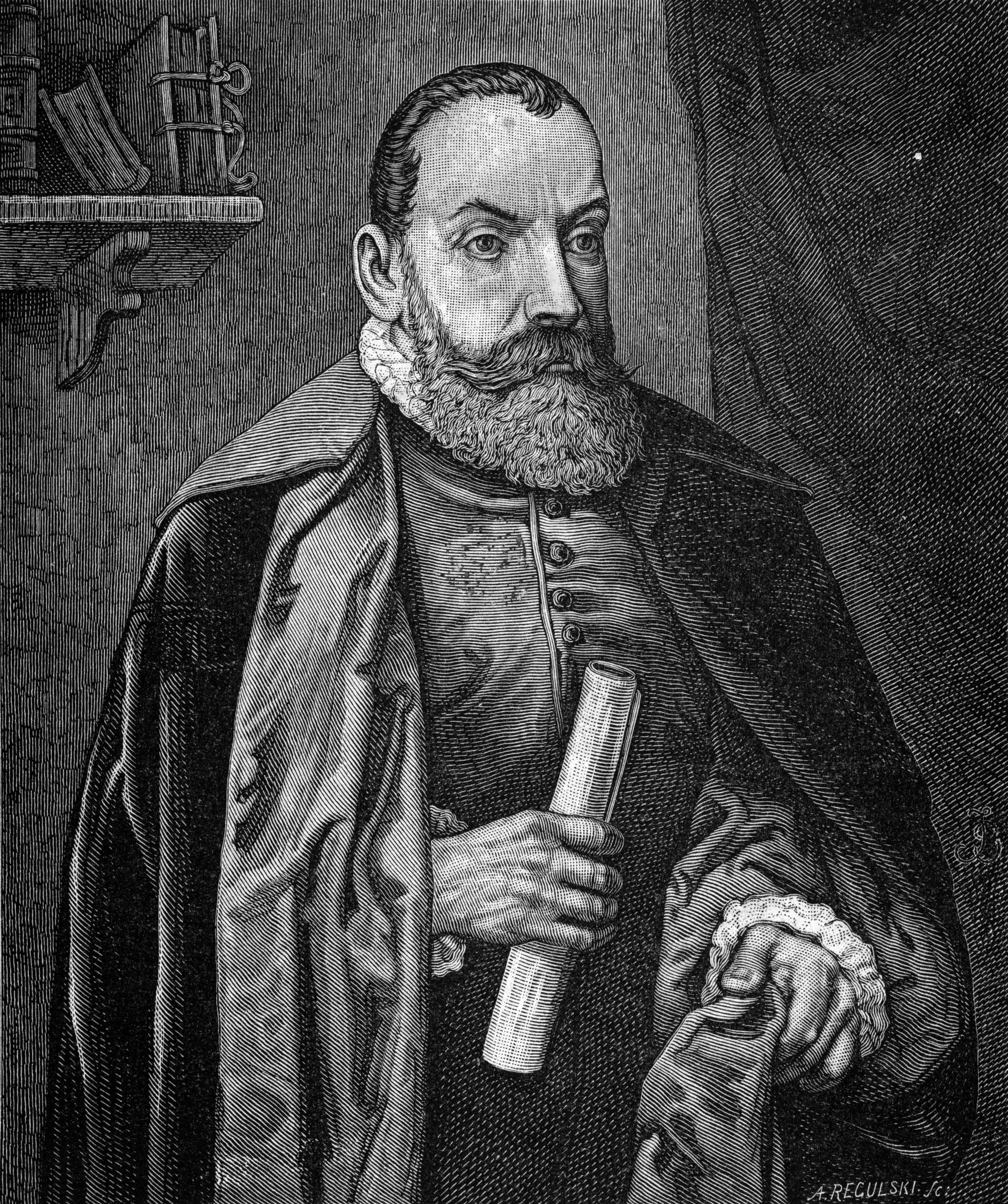
Jan Kochanowski

Jan Kochanowski, a prominent Polish poet, wrote the Laments on the occasion of the 1579 death of his daughter Urszula (in English, "Ursula").

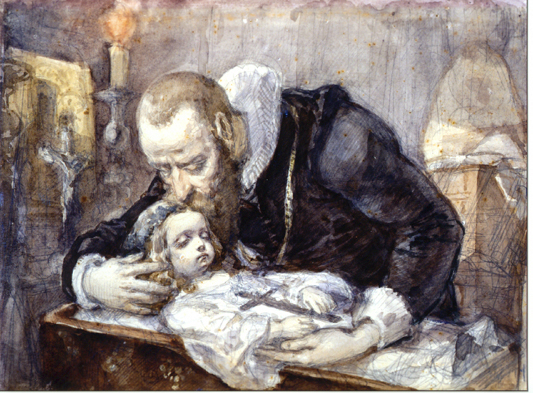
Kochanowski with dead Urszulka, by Jan Matejko

Little is known of Urszula (or Urszulka—"little Ursula"), except that at her death she was two and a half years old. Her young age has caused some critics to question Kochanowski's truthfulness, when he describes her as a budding poetess — a "Slavic Sappho". There is, however, no doubt as to the unaffected sentiments expressed in the nineteen Roman-numbered Laments, of varying length, which still speak to readers across the four and a quarter centuries since they were composed.

The poems express Kochanowski's boundless grief; and, standing in sharp contrast to his previous works, which had advocated such values as stoicism, can be seen as the poet's own critique of his earlier work. In a wider sense, they show a thinking man of the Renaissance at a moment of crisis when he is forced, through suffering and the stark confrontation of his ideals with reality, to re-evaluate his former humanistic philosophy of life.

The Laments belong to a Renaissance poetic genre of grief (threnody, or elegy), and the entire work comprises parts characteristic of epicedia: the first poems introduce the tragedy and feature a eulogy of the decedent; then come verses of lamentation, demonstrating the magnitude of the poet's loss and grief; followed at last by verses of consolation and instruction.

Kochanowski, while drawing on the achievements of classical poets such as Homer, Cicero, Plutarch, Seneca and Statius, as well as on later works by Petrarch and his own Renaissance contemporaries such as Pierre de Ronsard, stepped outside the borders of known genres, and his Laments constitute a mixed form ranging from epigram to elegy to epitaph, not to mention psalmodic song.

When the Treny were published (1580), Kochanowski was criticized for having taken as the subject of his Laments the death of a young child, against the prevailing literary convention that this form should be reserved for "great men" and "great events."

== Influence ==
The Laments are numbered among the greatest attainments of Polish poetry. Their exquisite conceits and artistry made them a model to literati of the 16th and especially the 17th century. The Laments have also inspired musicians , and painters such as Jan Matejko.

== Translation into English ==
A number of scholars and translators have translated some of Kochanowski's Laments into English. They include, among others, Dorothea Prall in 1920 and Stanisław Barańczak and Nobel-laureate poet Seamus Heaney in 1995.

== See also ==
- Elegy
- Lament
- Sapphic stanza in Polish poetry
- Threnody
- Mikołaj Rej
- Anna Stanisławska
