= Mac Flecknoe =

Poem by John Dryden, published in 1682

Mac Flecknoe (full title: Mac Flecknoe; or, A satyr upon the True-Blue-Protestant Poet, T.S.) is a verse mock-heroic satire written by John Dryden and published in 1682. It is a direct attack on Thomas Shadwell, another prominent poet of the time. It opens with the lines:

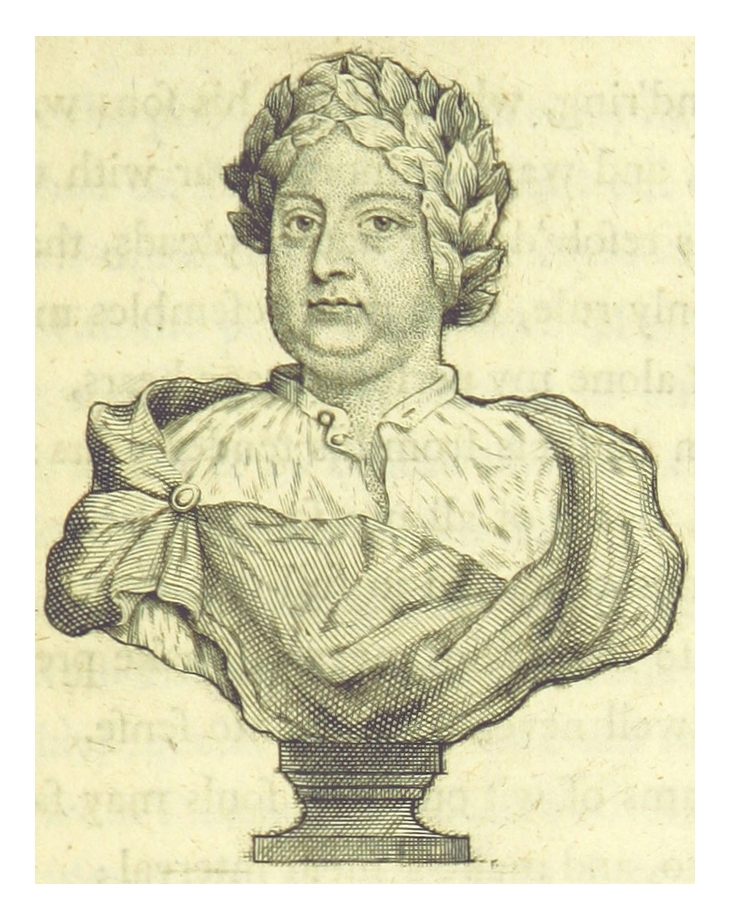
Bust of Mac Flecknoe, from an 18th-century edition of Dryden's poems

All humane things are subject to decay,
And, when Fate summons, Monarchs must obey:

— lines 1-2

Written about 1678, but not published until 1682 (see 1682 in poetry), "Mac Flecknoe" is the outcome of a series of disagreements between Thomas Shadwell and Dryden. Their quarrel blossomed from the following disagreements: "1) their different estimates of the genius of Ben Jonson, 2) the preference of Dryden for comedy of wit and repartee and of Shadwell, the chief disciple of Jonson, for humors comedy, 3) a sharp disagreement over the true purpose of comedy, 4) contention over the value of rhymed plays, and 5) plagiarism." Shadwell fancied himself heir to Ben Jonson and to the variety of comedy which the latter had commonly written. Shadwell's poetry was certainly not of the same standard as Jonson's, and it is possible that Dryden wearied of Shadwell's argument that Dryden undervalued Jonson. Shadwell and Dryden were separated not only by literary ideas but also by political ones, for Shadwell was a Whig, while Dryden was an outspoken supporter of the Stuart monarchy.

The poem depicts Shadwell as the heir to a kingdom of poetic dullness, represented by his association with Richard Flecknoe, an earlier poet already satirized by Andrew Marvell and disliked by Dryden, although the poet does not use belittling techniques to satirize him. Multiple allusions in the satire to 17th-century literary works, and to classic Greek and Roman literature, demonstrate Dryden's complex approach and his mastery of the mock-heroic style.

The poem begins in the tone of an epic masterpiece, presenting Shadwell's defining characteristic as dullness, just as every epic hero has a defining characteristic: Odysseus's is cunning; Achilles's is wrath; the hero of Spenser's The Faerie Queene is of holiness; whilst Satan in Paradise Lost has the defining characteristic of pride. Thus, Dryden subverts the theme of the defining characteristic by giving Shadwell a negative characteristic as his only virtue. Dryden uses the mock-heroic through his use of the heightened language of the epic to treat the trivial subjects such as poorly written and largely dismissible poetry. The juxtaposition of the lofty style with unexpected nouns such as 'dullness' provides an ironic contrast and makes the satiric point by the obvious disparity. In this, it works at the verbal level, with the language being carried by compelling rhythm and rhyme.
