= Charles Dryden (English writer) =

English writer and papal chamberlain (1666–1704)

Charles Dryden (1666–1704) was an English chamberlain to Pope Innocent XII.

== Biography ==
Born at Charlton, London in 1666, Charles was the first son of the poet John Dryden and his wife Elizabeth, daughter of Thomas Howard, 1st Earl of Berkshire. He was educated at Westminster School (as was his younger brother, John) and elected to Trinity College, Cambridge.

In 1683, Dryden wrote some poems, one of which, in Latin, appeared in the second Miscellany. He executed the seventh satire for his father's translation of Juvenal in 1692. About that time he went to Italy and was appointed chamberlain to Pope Innocent XII. Here he wrote an English poem which appeared in the fourth Miscellany. He returned to England in about 1697 or 1698; administered to his father's effects; was drowned in the Thames near Datchet, and buried at Windsor 20 August 1704. Sir Walter Scott records in his Life of John Dryden (1834) that Charles was attempting to swim across the Thames on 20 August.

John Dryden, who was a believer in astrology, calculated his son's horoscope, and on the strength of it prophesied in 1697 that he would soon recover his health, having been injured by a fall at Rome. "Corinna" (Elizabeth Thomas) constructed an elaborate fiction upon this basis, showing that Dryden had foretold three periods of danger to his son, at one of which Charles fell from a (non-existent) tower of the Vatican five stories high and was "mashed to a mummy" for the time. Malone reprints this narrative, which is only worth notice from the use made of it in Sir Walter Scott's Guy Mannering.
