= Sir Erasmus Henry Dryden, 5th Baronet =

English Roman Catholic priest and baronet

Sir Erasmus Henry Dryden, 5th Baronet (1669–1710) was an English Roman Catholic priest (Father Thomas, OP) and baronet.

== Biography ==
Erasmus Henry, born 2 May 1669, was the third son of the poet John Dryden, and his wife, Elizabeth, daughter of Thomas Howard, 1st Earl of Berkshire. He was a scholar at Charterhouse School on the nomination of Charles II of England from February 1683 until November 1685. He then studied at the English College, Douai, entered the novitiate of the Dominicans in 1692, and was ordained priest in 1694.

Dryden was at Rome in 1697, residing in the convent of the English Dominicans, and in that year was sent to the Holy Cross convent in Bornheim, of which he was sub-prior until 1700. He then returned to England to labour on the mission in Northamptonshire.

From 1708, he resided at Canons Ashby, which in that year had passed by will to his cousin Edward, eldest son of his father's younger brother, Erasmus. In 1710, he became baronet upon the death of another cousin, Sir John Dryden, 4th Baronet, grandson of the Sir Erasmus Drayton, 1st Baronet, of Canons-Ashby (1619).

The 5th Baronet died later that same year and was buried at Canons Ashby on 4 December 1710. He was succeeded in the baronetcy by his uncle, Sir Erasmus Dryden, 6th Baronet.

== Notes ==
Baronetage of England
Preceded by John Dryden	Baronet (of Canons Ashby); 1710	Succeeded by Erasmus Dryden
