= The Hind and the Panther =

1687 poem by John Dryden

- by John Dryden
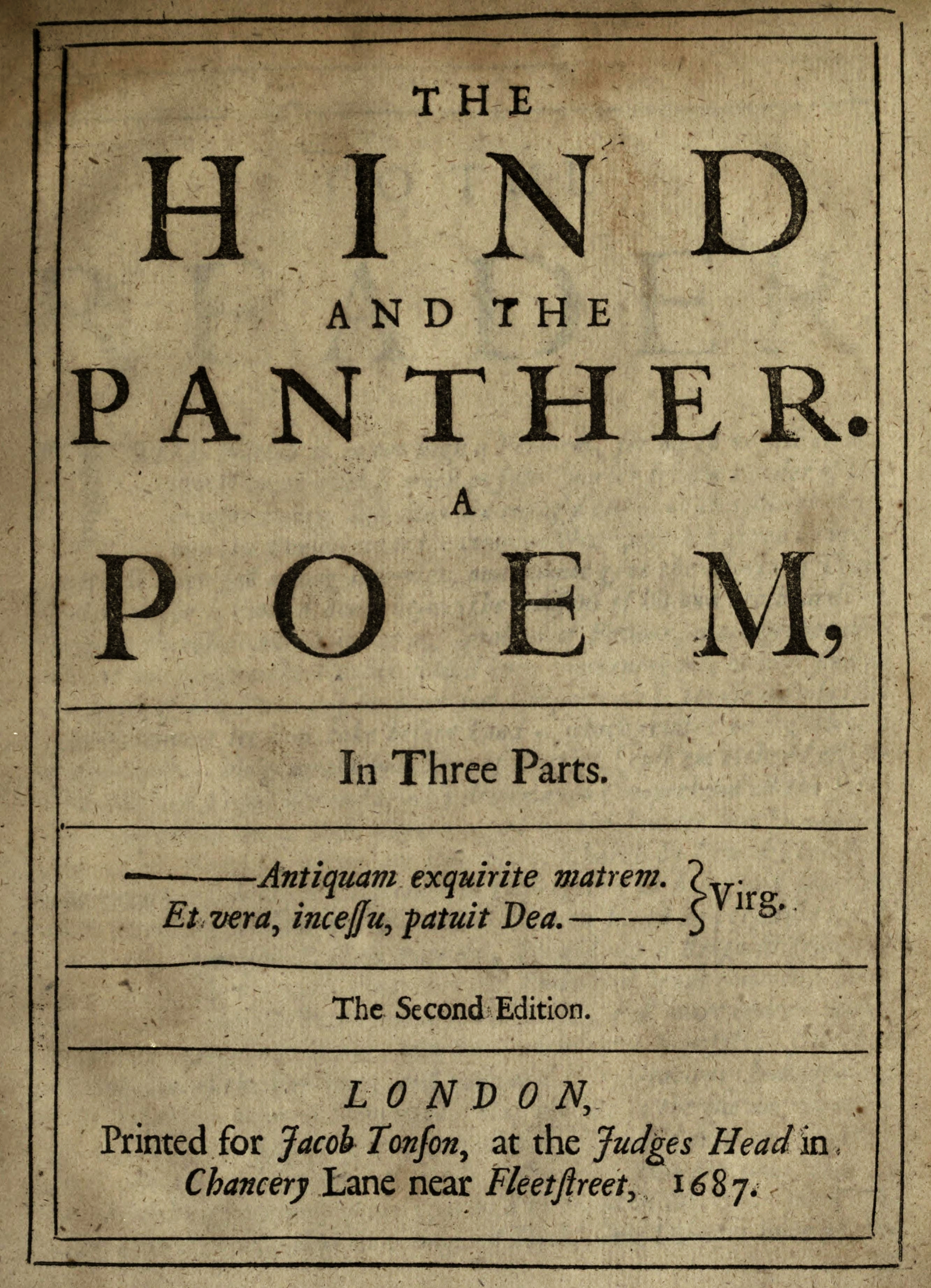
- Title page to the 1687 2nd edition
- Country: England
- Language: English
- Genre(s): Religious poem, beast fable
- Publisher: Jacob Tonson
- Publication date: 1687
- Media type: Print (hardback)
- Lines: 2,569
- Pages: 145 pp

Full text
- The Hind and the Panther at Wikisource

The Hind and the Panther: A Poem, in Three Parts (1687) is an allegory in heroic couplets by John Dryden. At some 2600 lines it is much the longest of Dryden's poems, translations excepted, and perhaps the most controversial. The critic Margaret Doody has called it "the great, the undeniable, sui generis poem of the Restoration era…It is its own kind of poem, it cannot be repeated (and no one has repeated it)."

== Theme and synopsis ==
Dryden converted to Catholicism more or less simultaneously with the accession of the Roman Catholic king James II in 1685, to the disgust of many Protestant writers. The Hind and the Panther is considered the major poetic result of Dryden's conversion, and presents some evidence for thinking that Dryden became a Catholic from genuine conviction rather than political time-serving, in so far as his call for an alliance of Anglicans, Catholics and King against the Nonconformists directly contradicted James II's policy of appealing to the Nonconformists as allies against the Church of England.

The Hind and the Panther falls into three parts: the first is a description of the different religious denominations, in which the Roman Catholic church appears as "A milk-white Hind, immortal and unchanged", the Church of England as a panther, the Independents as a bear, the Presbyterians as a wolf, the Quakers as a hare, the Socinians as a fox, the Freethinkers as an ape, and the Anabaptists as a boar; the second part deals with the controversial topics of church authority and transubstantiation; and the third part argues that the Crown and the Anglican and Catholic Churches should form a united front against the Nonconformist churches and the Whigs.

== Critical reception ==
The poem was answered by a flurry of hostile pamphlets, the best-known being The Hind and the Panther Transvers'd to the Story of the Country Mouse and the City Mouse by Matthew Prior and Charles Montagu, which ridiculed the incongruity of animals debating theology:

Is it not as easie to imagine two Mice bilking Coachmen, and supping at the Devil; as to suppose a Hind entertaining the Panther at a Hermit's Cell, discussing the greatest Mysteries of Religion?

The satirist Tom Brown rhetorically asked "How can he stand up for any mode of Worship, who hath been accustomed to bite, and spit his Venom against the very Name thereof?" As the passions aroused by James II's reign slowly faded the poem began to be judged on its own merits. Dr. Johnson tells us that Alexander Pope used to refer to The Hind and the Panther as the most "correct" example of Dryden's versification. Johnson's own opinion was that the poem was

written with great smoothness of metre, a wide extent of knowledge, and an abundant multiplicity of images; the controversy is embellished with pointed sentences, diversified by illustrations, and enlivened by sallies of invective.

Nevertheless, he agreed with Prior and Montagu that "The scheme of the work is injudicious and incommodious; for what can be more absurd than that one beast should counsel another to rest her faith upon a pope and council?" Walter Scott found this no more absurd than any other fine beast-fable, and considered that the versification

never falls, never becomes rugged; rises with the dignified strain of the poetry; sinks into quaint familiarity, where sarcasm and humour are employed; and winds through all the mazes of theological argument, without becoming either obscure or prosaic. The arguments are in general advanced with an air of conviction and candour, which, in those days, must have required the protestant reader to be on his guard in the perusal, and which seems completely to ascertain the sincerity of the author in his new religious creed.

William Hazlitt believed the poem to have "more genius, vehemence and strength of description than any other of Dryden's works". Lord Macaulay's Whiggish distaste for its message was balanced by an admiration of the poem's style: "In none of Dryden's works can be found passages more pathetic and magnificent, greater ductility and energy of language, or a more pleasing and various music". George Saintsbury encapsulated this ambivalent attitude when he called The Hind and the Panther "the greatest poem ever written in the teeth of its subject".
