= John Dryden =

English poet and playwright (1630–1700)

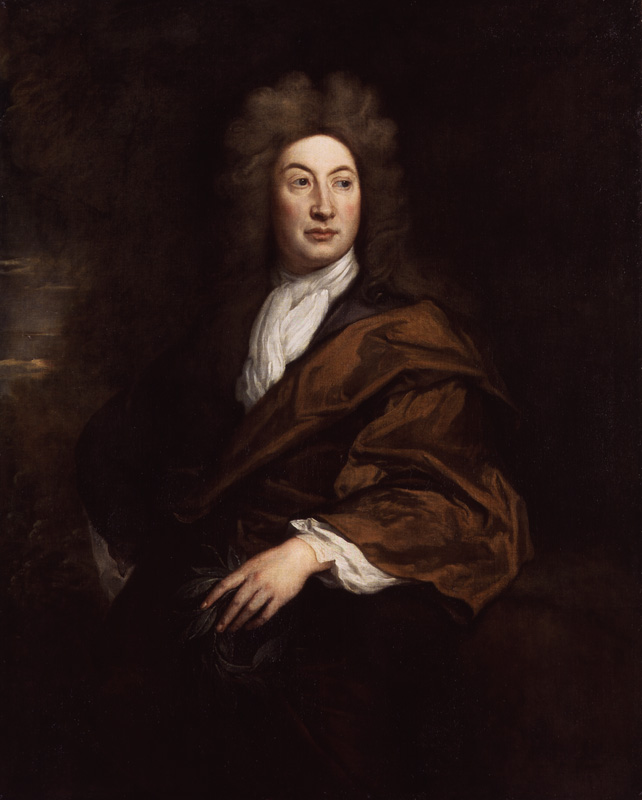
- Portrait by Sir Godfrey Kneller, c. 1693

Poet Laureate of England
- In office 13 April 1668 – 1688
- Monarchs: Charles II (until 1685); James II
- Preceded by: Position established
- Succeeded by: Thomas Shadwell

Personal details
- Born: 19 August 1631 Aldwincle, Northamptonshire, England
- Died: 12 May 1700 (aged 68) London, England
- Spouse: Lady Elizabeth Howard (m. 1663)
- Children: Charles, John, and Erasmus Henry
- Education: Trinity College, Cambridge
- Occupation: Poet; literary critic; playwright; librettist
- Writing career
- Language: English
- Period: 1659–1700
- Genres: Satire; play; fable; poetry; essay; libretto; translation
- Movement: Classicism

John Dryden (/ˈdraɪdən/; 19 August [O.S. 9 August] 1631 – 12 May [O.S. 1 May] 1700) was an English poet, literary critic, translator, and playwright who in 1668 was appointed England's first Poet Laureate. He is seen as dominating the literary life of Restoration England to such a point that the period came to be known in literary circles as the Age of Dryden. Romantic writer Sir Walter Scott called him "Glorious John".

== Early life ==
Dryden was born in the village rectory of Aldwincle near Thrapston in Northamptonshire, where his maternal grandfather was the rector of All Saints. He was the eldest of fourteen children born to Erasmus Dryden and wife Mary Pickering. His father was paternal grandson of Sir Erasmus Dryden, 1st Baronet (1553–1632), and wife Frances Wilkes, landowning gentry who supported the Puritan cause and Parliament. He was a second cousin once removed of Jonathan Swift. As a boy, Dryden lived in the nearby village of Titchmarsh, where it is likely that he received his first education. In 1644 he was sent as a King's Scholar to Westminster School where his headmaster was Richard Busby, a charismatic teacher and a severe disciplinarian. Having been re-founded by Elizabeth I, Westminster during this period embraced a very different religious and political spirit, encouraging royalism and high Anglicanism. Whatever Dryden's response to this was, he clearly respected the headmaster and would later send two of his sons to school at Westminster.

As a humanist public school, Westminster maintained a curriculum which trained pupils in the art of rhetoric and the presentation of arguments for both sides of a given issue. This is a skill which would remain with Dryden and influence his later writing and thinking, as much of it displays these dialectical patterns. The Westminster curriculum included weekly translation assignments which developed Dryden's capacity for assimilation. This was also to be exhibited in his later works. His years at Westminster were eventful, and his first published poem, an elegy with a strong royalist feel on the death of his schoolmate Henry, Lord Hastings, from smallpox, alludes to the execution of King Charles I, which took place on 30 January 1649, very near the school, where Busby had first prayed for the king and then locked in his schoolboys to prevent their attending the spectacle.

In 1650 Dryden went up to Trinity College, Cambridge. Here he would have experienced a return to the religious and political ethos of his childhood: the Master of Trinity was a Puritan preacher by the name of Thomas Hill who had been a rector in Dryden's home village. Though there is little specific information on Dryden's undergraduate years, he would probably have followed the standard curriculum of classics, rhetoric, and mathematics. In 1654 he graduated as a BA, at the top of the list for Trinity that year. In June of the same year Dryden's father died, leaving him some land which generated a little income, but not enough to live on.

Returning to London during the Protectorate, Dryden obtained work with Oliver Cromwell's Secretary of State, John Thurloe. This appointment may have been the result of influence exercised on his behalf by his cousin the Lord Chamberlain, Sir Gilbert Pickering. At Cromwell's funeral on 23 November 1658 Dryden processed with the Puritan poets John Milton and Andrew Marvell. Soon afterwards he published his first important poem, Heroic Stanzas (1659), a eulogy on Cromwell's death which is cautious and prudent in its emotional display. In 1660 Dryden celebrated the Restoration of the monarchy and the return of Charles II with Astraea Redux, an authentic royalist panegyric. In this work the Interregnum is illustrated as a time of chaos, and Charles is seen as the restorer of peace and order.

== Later life and career ==
After the Restoration, as Dryden quickly established himself as the leading poet and literary critic of his day, he transferred his allegiances to the new government. Along with Astraea Redux, Dryden welcomed the new regime with two more panegyrics: To His Sacred Majesty: A Panegyric on his Coronation (1662) and To My Lord Chancellor (1662). These poems suggest that Dryden was looking to court a possible patron, but he was to instead make a living in writing for publishers, not for the aristocracy, and thus ultimately for the reading public. These, and his other nondramatic poems, are occasional—that is, they celebrate public events. Thus they are written for the nation rather than the self, and the Poet Laureate (as he would later become) is obliged to write a certain number of these per annum. In November 1662, Dryden was proposed for membership in the Royal Society, and he was elected an early fellow. However, Dryden was inactive in Society affairs and was expelled in 1666 for non-payment of his dues.

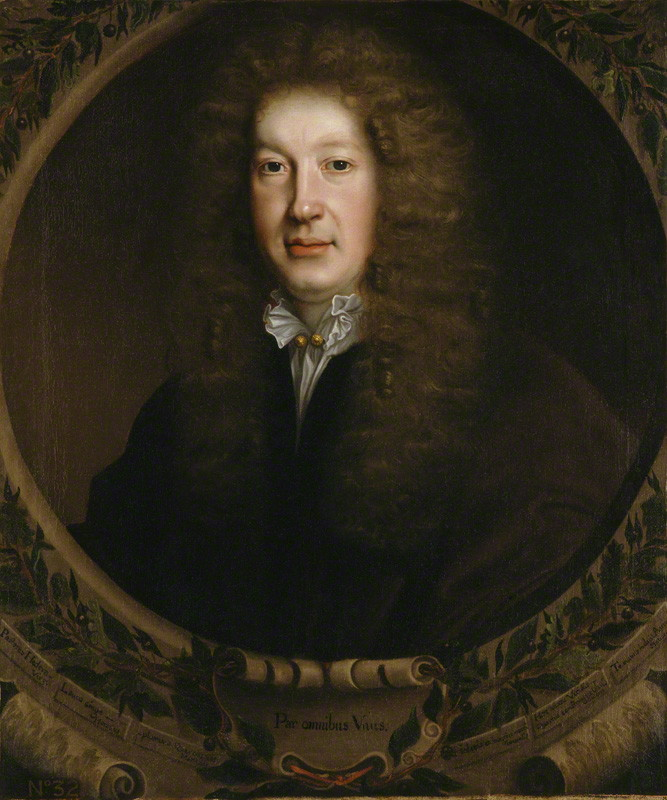
Dryden, by John Michael Wright, 1668

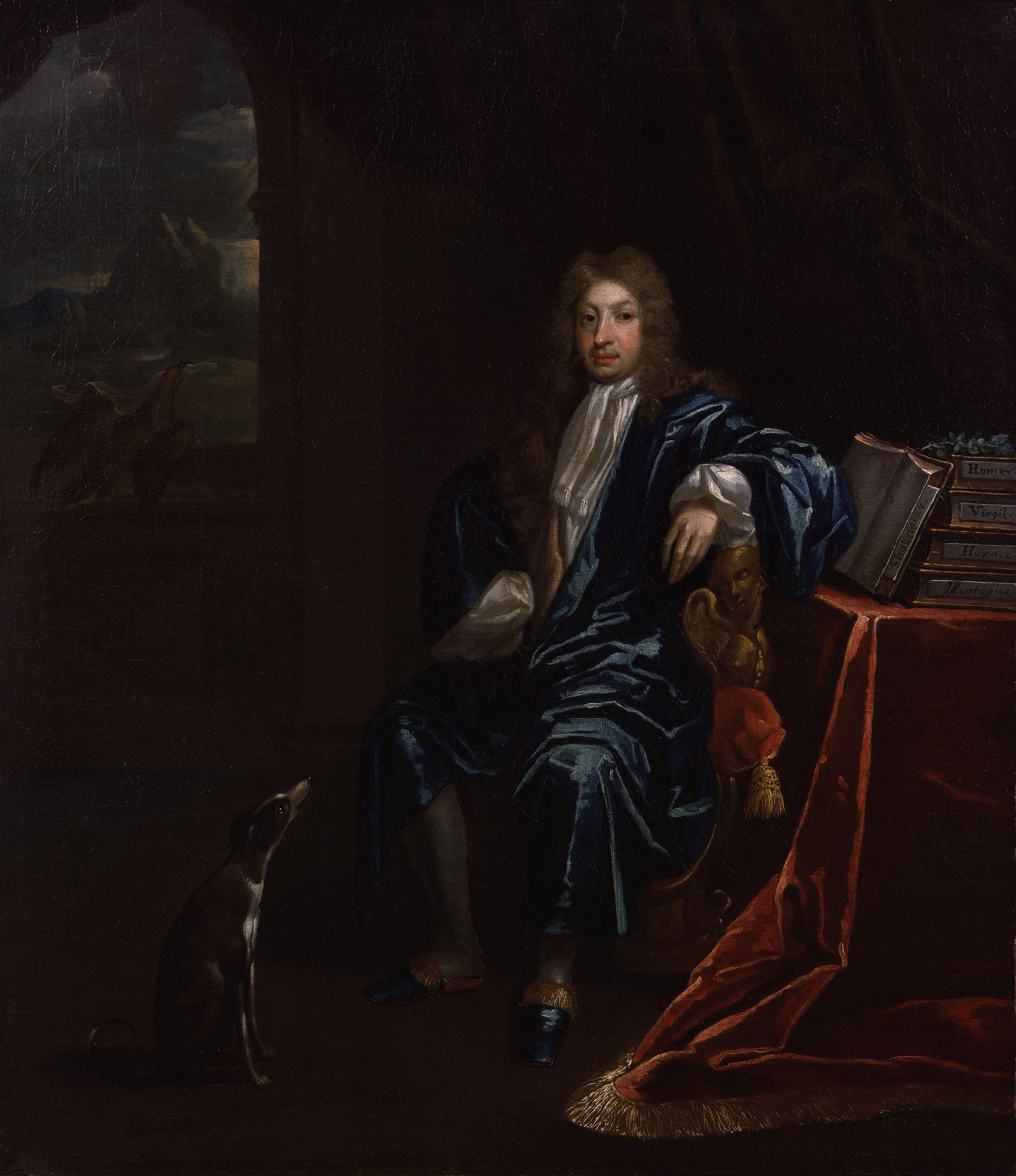
Dryden, by James Maubert, c. 1695

On 1 December 1663, Dryden married the royalist sister of Sir Robert Howard—Lady Elizabeth. Dryden's works occasionally contain outbursts against the married state but also celebrations of the same. Thus, little is known of the intimate side of his marriage. Lady Elizabeth bore three sons, one of whom (Erasmus Henry) became a Roman Catholic priest.

With the reopening of the theatres in 1660 after the Puritan ban, Dryden began writing plays. His first play The Wild Gallant appeared in 1663, and was not successful, but was still promising, and from 1668 on he was contracted to produce three plays a year for the King's Company in which he became a shareholder. During the 1660s and 1670s, theatrical writing was his main source of income. He led the way in Restoration comedy, his best-known work being Marriage à la Mode (1673), as well as heroic tragedy and regular tragedy, in which his greatest success was All for Love (1677).

Dryden was never satisfied with his theatrical writings and frequently suggested that his talents were wasted on unworthy audiences. He thus was making a bid for poetic fame off-stage. In 1667, around the same time his dramatic career began, he published Annus Mirabilis, a lengthy historical poem which described the English defeat of the Dutch naval fleet and the Great Fire of London in 1666. It was a modern epic in pentameter quatrains that established him as the preeminent poet of his generation, and was crucial in his attaining the posts of Poet Laureate (1667) and historiographer royal (1670).

When the Great Plague of London closed the theatres in 1665, Dryden retreated to Wiltshire where he wrote Of Dramatick Poesie (1668), arguably the best of his unsystematic prefaces and essays. Dryden constantly defended his own literary practice, and Of Dramatick Poesie, the longest of his critical works, takes the form of a dialogue in which four characters—each based on a prominent contemporary, with Dryden himself as 'Neander'—debate the merits of classical, French and English drama. The greater part of his critical works introduce problems which he is eager to discuss, and show the work of a writer of independent mind who feels strongly about his own ideas, ideas which demonstrate the breadth of his reading. He felt strongly about the relation of the poet to tradition and the creative process, and his best heroic play Aureng-zebe (1675) has a prologue which denounces the use of rhyme in serious drama. His play All for Love (1677) was written in blank verse, and was to immediately follow Aureng-Zebe.

Dryden's poem "An Essay upon Satire" contained a number of attacks on King Charles II, his mistresses and courtiers, but most pointedly on the Earl of Rochester, a notorious womaniser. Rochester responded by hiring thugs who attacked Dryden whilst walking back from Will's Coffee House (a popular London coffee house where the Wits gathered to gossip, drink and conduct their business) to his house on Gerrard Street. At around 8 pm on 18 December 1679, Dryden was attacked in Rose Alley behind the Lamb & Flag pub, near his home in Covent Garden. Dryden survived the attack, offering £50 for the identity of the thugs placed in the London Gazette, and a Royal Pardon if one of them would confess. No one claimed the reward.

Dryden's greatest achievements were in satiric verse: the mock-heroic Mac Flecknoe, a more personal product of his laureate years, was a lampoon circulated in manuscript and an attack on the playwright Thomas Shadwell. Dryden's main goal in the work is to "satirize Shadwell, ostensibly for his offenses against literature but more immediately we may suppose for his habitual badgering of him on the stage and in print." It is not a belittling form of satire, but rather one which makes his object great in ways which are unexpected, transferring the ridiculous into poetry. This line of satire continued with Absalom and Achitophel (1681) and The Medal (1682). His other major works from this period are the religious poems Religio Laici (1682), written from the position of a member of the Church of England [against catholicism]; his 1683 edition of Plutarch's Lives Translated From the Greek by Several Hands in which he introduced the word 'biography' to English readers; and The Hind and the Panther, (1687) which celebrates his conversion to Roman Catholicism.

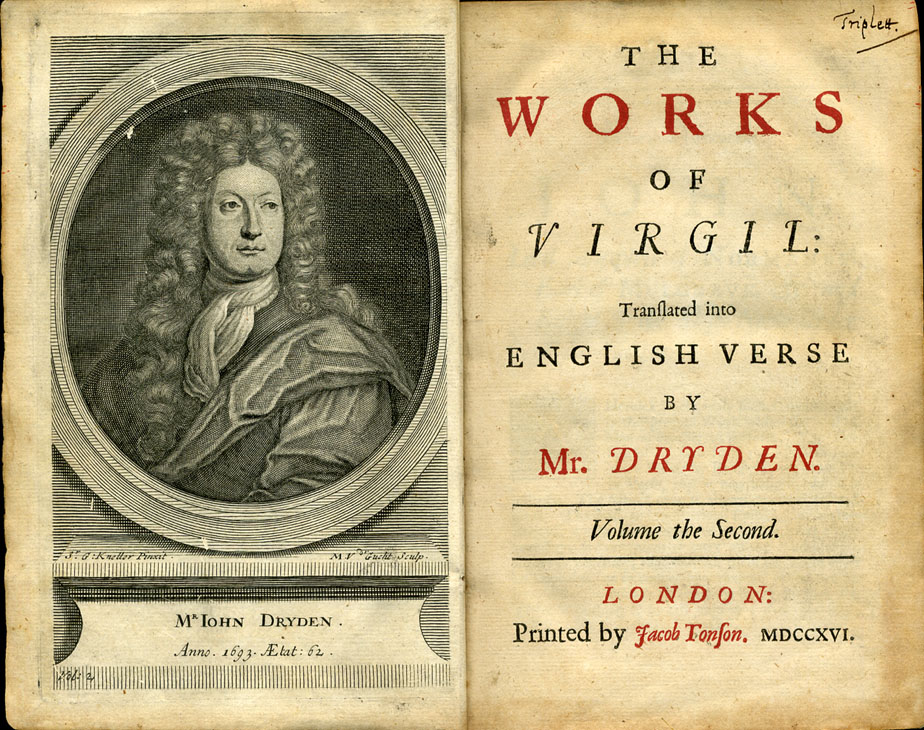
Frontispiece and title page, vol. II, 1716 edition, Works of Virgil translated by Dryden

He wrote Britannia Rediviva celebrating the birth of a son and heir to the Catholic King and Queen on 10 June 1688.

When, later in the same year, James II was deposed in the Glorious Revolution, Dryden's refusal to take the oaths of allegiance to the new monarchs, William and Mary, left him out of favor at court. Thomas Shadwell succeeded him as Poet Laureate, and he was forced to give up his public offices and live by the proceeds of his pen. Dryden translated works by Horace, Juvenal, Ovid, Lucretius, and Theocritus, a task which he found far more satisfying than writing for the stage. In 1694 he began work on what would be his most ambitious and defining work as translator, The Works of Virgil (1697), which was published by subscription. The publication of the translation of Virgil was a national event and brought Dryden the sum of £1,400. Dryden translated the Aeneid into couplets, turning Virgil's almost 10,000 lines into 13,700 lines; Joseph Addison wrote the (prose) prefaces for each book, and William Congreve checked the translation against the Latin original. His final translations appeared in Fables Ancient and Modern (1700), a series of episodes from Ovid, Boccaccio and Geoffrey Chaucer. As a translator, he made great literary works in the older languages available to readers of English.

== Death ==
Dryden died on 12 May 1700, and was initially buried in St. Anne's cemetery in Soho, before being exhumed and reburied in Westminster Abbey ten days later. He was the subject of poetic eulogies, such as Luctus Brittannici: or the Tears of the British Muses; for the Death of John Dryden, Esq. (London, 1700), and The Nine Muses. A Royal Society of Arts blue plaque commemorates Dryden at 43 Gerrard Street in London's Chinatown. He lived at 137 Long Acre from 1682 to 1686 and at 43 Gerrard Street from 1686 until his death.

In his will, he left The George Inn at Northampton to trustees, to form a school for the children of the poor of the town. This became John Dryden's School, later The Orange School.

== Reputation and influence ==
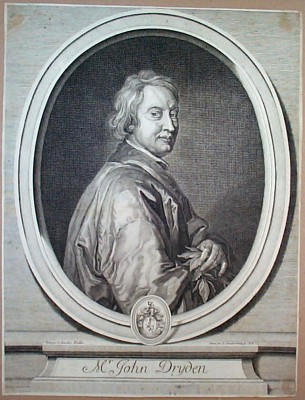
Dryden near end of his life

Dryden was the dominant literary figure and influence of his age. He established the heroic couplet as a standard form of English poetry by writing successful satires, religious pieces, fables, epigrams, compliments, prologues, and plays with it; he also introduced the alexandrine and triplet into the form. In his poems, translations, and criticism, he established a poetic diction appropriate to the heroic couplet—Auden referred to him as "the master of the middle style"—that was a model for his contemporaries and for much of the 18th century. The considerable loss felt by the English literary community at his death was evident in the elegies written about him. Dryden's heroic couplet became the dominant poetic form of the 18th century. Alexander Pope was heavily influenced by Dryden and often borrowed from him; other writers were equally influenced by Dryden and Pope. Pope famously praised Dryden's versification in his imitation of Horace's Epistle II.i: "Dryden taught to join / The varying pause, the full resounding line, / The long majestic march, and energy divine." Samuel Johnson summed up the general attitude with his remark that "the veneration with which his name is pronounced by every cultivator of English literature, is paid to him as he refined the language, improved the sentiments, and tuned the numbers of English poetry." His poems were very widely read, and are often quoted, for instance, in Henry Fielding's Tom Jones and Johnson's essays.

Johnson also noted, however, that "He is, therefore, with all his variety of excellence, not often pathetic; and had so little sensibility of the power of effusions purely natural, that he did not esteem them in others. Simplicity gave him no pleasure." Readers in the first half of the 18th century did not mind this too much, but later generations considered Dryden's absence of sensibility a fault.

One of the first attacks on Dryden's reputation was by William Wordsworth, who complained that Dryden's descriptions of natural objects in his translations from Virgil were much inferior to the originals. However, several of Wordsworth's contemporaries, such as George Crabbe, Lord Byron, and Walter Scott (who edited Dryden's works), were still keen admirers of Dryden. Besides, Wordsworth did admire many of Dryden's poems, and his famous "Intimations of Immortality" ode owes something stylistically to Dryden's "Alexander's Feast". John Keats admired the Fables, and imitated them in his poem Lamia. Later 19th-century writers had little use for verse satire, Pope, or Dryden; Matthew Arnold famously dismissed them as "classics of our prose". He did have a committed admirer in George Saintsbury, and was a prominent figure in quotation books such as Bartlett's, but the next major poet to take an interest in Dryden was T. S. Eliot, who wrote that he was "the ancestor of nearly all that is best in the poetry of the eighteenth century", and that "we cannot fully enjoy or rightly estimate a hundred years of English poetry unless we fully enjoy Dryden." However, in the same essay, Eliot accused Dryden of having a "commonplace mind". Critical interest in Dryden has increased recently, but, as a relatively straightforward writer (William Empson, another modern admirer of Dryden, compared his "flat" use of language with Donne's interest in the "echoes and recesses of words"), his work has not occasioned as much interest as Andrew Marvell's, John Donne's or Pope's.

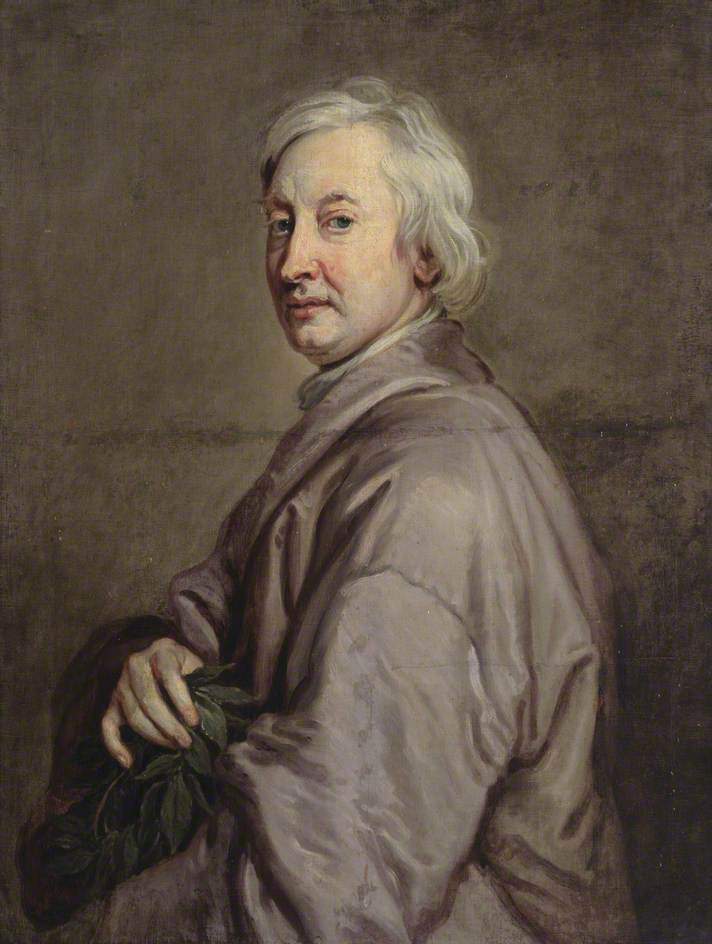
Dryden

Dryden is believed to be the first person to assert that English sentences should not end in prepositions because Latin sentences cannot end in prepositions. Dryden created the proscription against preposition stranding in 1672 when he objected to Ben Jonson's 1611 phrase, 'The bodies that those souls were frighted from.' However, he did not provide the rationale for his preference. Dryden often translated his writing into Latin, to check whether his writing was concise and elegant, Latin being considered an elegant and long-lived language with which to compare; then Dryden translated his writing back to English according to Latin-grammar usage. As Latin does not have sentences ending in prepositions, Dryden may have applied Latin grammar to English, thus forming the rule of no sentence-ending prepositions, subsequently adopted by other writers.

The phrase "blaze of glory" is believed to have originated in Dryden's 1686 poem The Hind and the Panther, referring to the throne of God as a "blaze of glory that forbids the sight."

== Poetic style ==
What Dryden achieved in his poetry was neither the emotional excitement of the early nineteenth-century romantics nor the intellectual complexities of the metaphysicals. His subject matter was often factual, and he aimed at expressing his thoughts in the most precise and concentrated manner. Although he uses formal structures such as heroic couplets, he tried to recreate the natural rhythm of speech, and he knew that different subjects need different kinds of verse. In his preface to Religio Laici he says that "the expressions of a poem designed purely for instruction ought to be plain and natural, yet majestic... The florid, elevated and figurative way is for the passions; for (these) are begotten in the soul by showing the objects out of their true proportion.... A man is to be cheated into passion, but to be reasoned into truth."

=== Translation style ===
While Dryden had many admirers, he also had his share of critics, Mark Van Doren among them. Van Doren complained that in translating Virgil's Aeneid, Dryden had added "a fund of phrases with which he could expand any passage that seemed to him curt." Dryden did not feel such expansion was a fault, arguing that as Latin is a naturally concise language it cannot be duly represented by a comparable number of words in English. "He...recognized that Virgil 'had the advantage of a language wherein much may be comprehended in a little space' (5:329–30). The 'way to please the best Judges...is not to Translate a Poet literally; and Virgil least of any other' (5:329)."

For example, take lines 789–795 of Book 2 when Aeneas sees and receives a message from the ghost of his wife, Creusa.

iamque vale et nati serva communis amorem.'
haec ubi dicta dedit, lacrimantem et multa volentem
dicere deseruit, tenuisque recessit in auras.
ter conatus ibi collo dare bracchia circum;
ter frustra comprensa manus effugit imago,
par levibus ventis volucrique simillima somno.
sic demum socios consumpta nocte reviso

Dryden translates it like this:

I trust our common issue to your care.'
She said, and gliding pass'd unseen in air.
I strove to speak: but horror tied my tongue;
And thrice about her neck my arms I flung,
And, thrice deceiv'd, on vain embraces hung.
Light as an empty dream at break of day,
Or as a blast of wind, she rush'd away.
Thus having pass'd the night in fruitless pain,
I to my longing friends return again

Dryden's translation is based on presumed authorial intent and smooth English. In line 790 the literal translation of haec ubi dicta dedit is "when she gave these words." But "she said" gets the point across, uses half the words, and makes for better English. A few lines later, with ter conatus ibi collo dare bracchia circum; ter frustra comprensa manus effugit imago, he alters the literal translation "Thrice trying to give arms around her neck; thrice the image grasped in vain fled the hands," in order to fit it into the metre and the emotion of the scene.

In his own words,

The way I have taken, is not so streight as Metaphrase, nor so loose as Paraphrase: Some things too I have omitted, and sometimes added of my own. Yet the omissions I hope, are but of Circumstances, and such as wou'd have no grace in English; and the Addition, I also hope, are easily deduc'd from Virgil's Sense. They will seem (at least I have the Vanity to think so), not struck into him, but growing out of him. (5:529)

In a similar vein, Dryden writes in his Preface to the translation anthology Sylvae:

Where I have taken away some of [the original authors'] Expressions, and cut them shorter, it may possibly be on this consideration, that what was beautiful in the Greek or Latin, would not appear so shining in the English; and where I have enlarg’d them, I desire the false Criticks would not always think that those thoughts are wholly mine, but that either they are secretly in the Poet, or may be fairly deduc’d from him; or at least, if both those considerations should fail, that my own is of a piece with his, and that if he were living, and an Englishman, they are such as he wou’d probably have written.

== Personal life ==
On 1 December 1663, Dryden married Lady Elizabeth Howard (died 1714) at St Swithin's, London, and the consent of the parents is noted on the licence, although Lady Elizabeth was then about twenty-five.

The couple met after 1660, when Dryden began lodging in London with her brother, Sir Robert Howard, son of the earl of Berkshire. The marriage lasted until his death, but there is little evidence about how they lived as a couple. A small estate in Wiltshire was settled upon them by her father. The lady's intellect and temper were apparently not good; her husband was treated as an inferior by those of her social status.

Both Dryden and his wife were warmly attached to their children. They had three sons: Charles (1666–1704), John (1668–1701), and Erasmus Henry (1669–1710). Lady Elizabeth Dryden survived her husband, but reportedly lost her wits after becoming a widow. Although some have historically claimed to be from the lineage of John Dryden, his three children, one of whom became a Roman Catholic priest, had no children themselves.

== Selected works ==
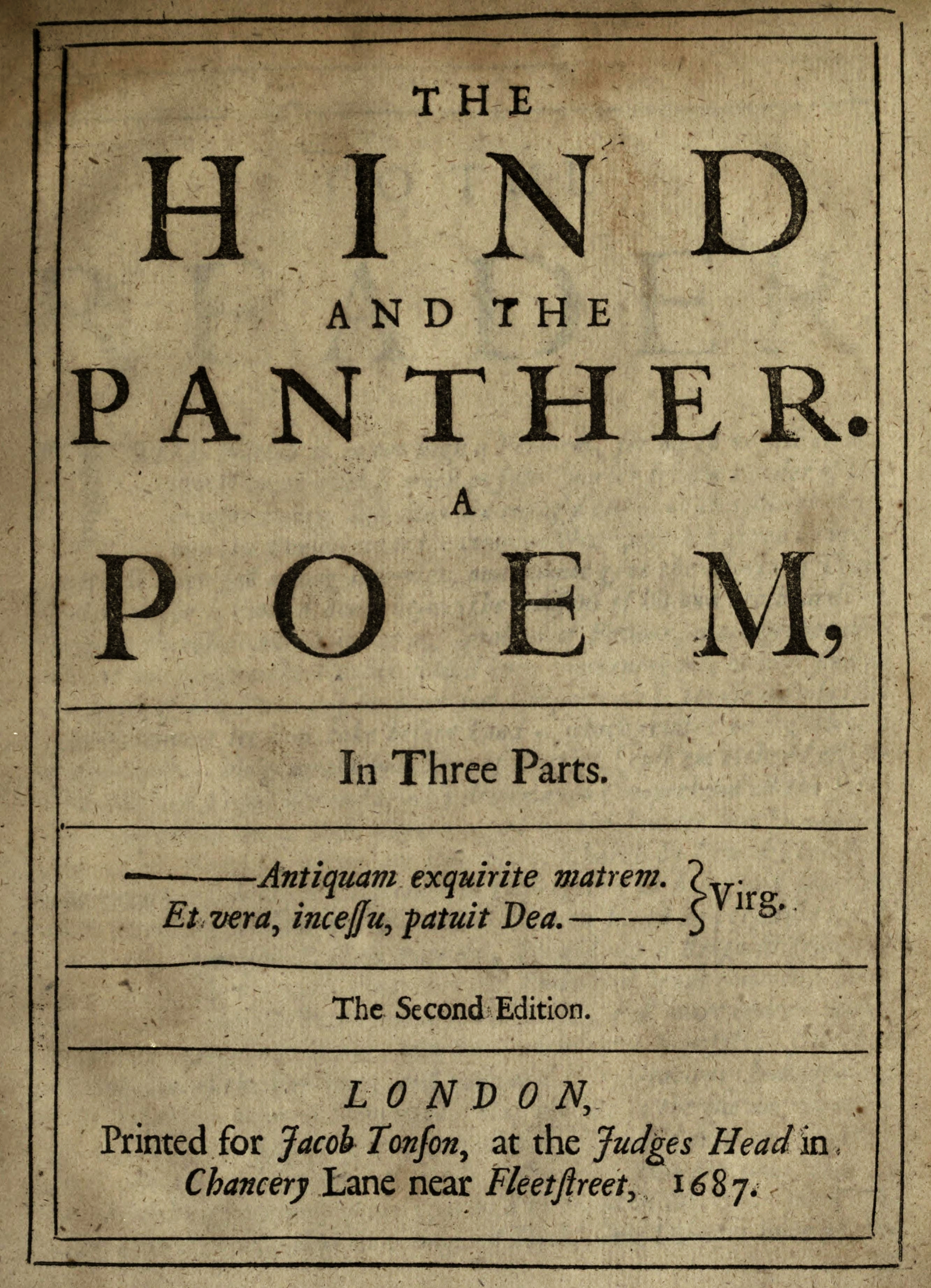
The title page of The Hind and the Panther

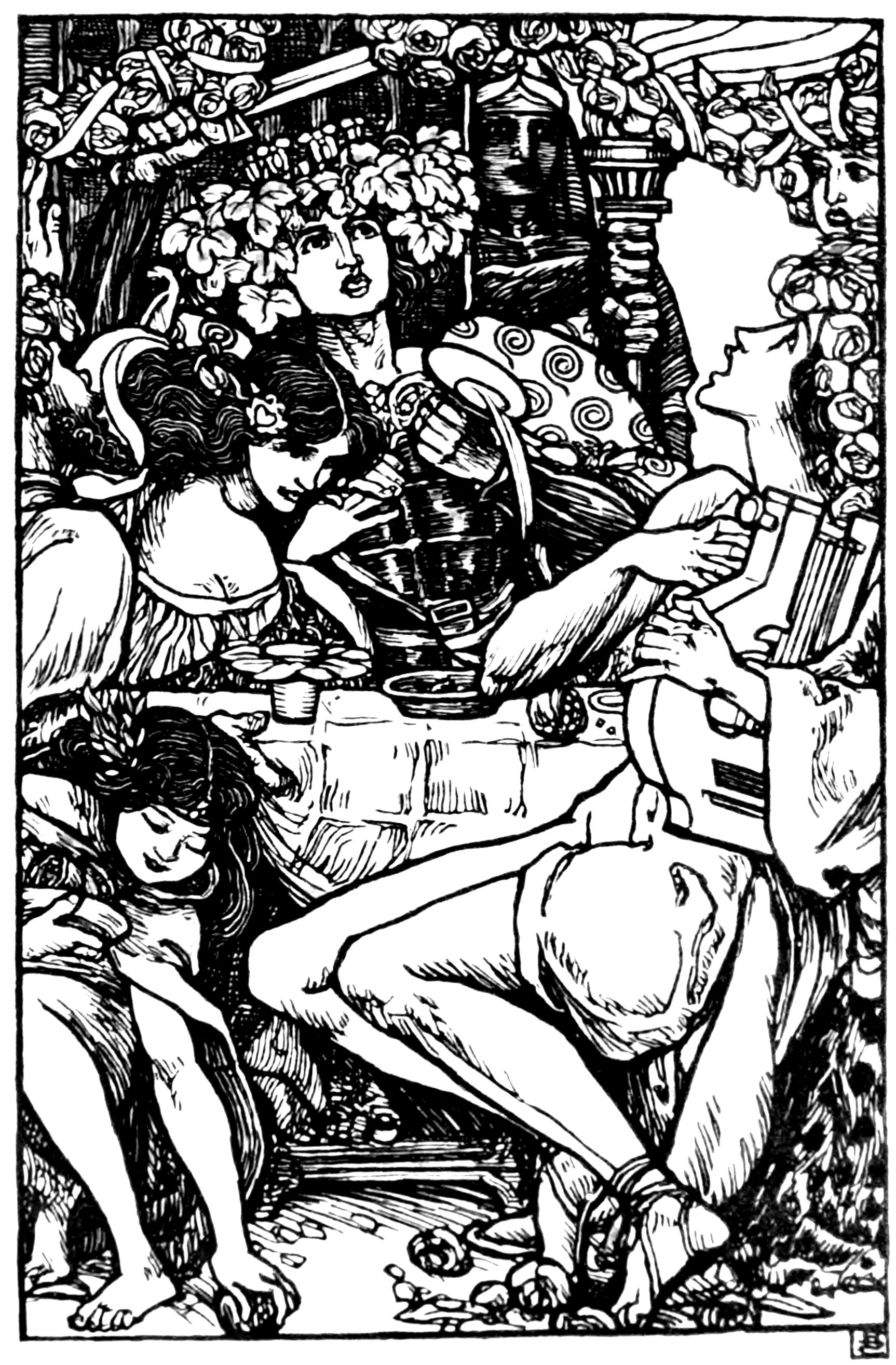
Frontispiece by Richard Savage for a 1904 edition of Alexander's Feast

=== Plays ===
Dates given are (acted/published) and unless otherwise noted are taken from Scott's edition.

- The Wild Gallant, a Comedy (1663/1669)
- The Rival Ladies, a Tragi-Comedy (1663/1664)
- The Indian Queen, a Tragedy (1664/1665), with Robert Howard
- The Indian Emperour, or the Conquest of Mexico by the Spaniards (1665/1667)
- The Maiden Queen (1667/1668)
- Sir Martin Mar-all, or the Feigned Innocence, a Comedy (1667/1668)
- The Tempest, or the Enchanted Island, a Comedy (1667/1670), with William D'Avenant
- An Evening's Love, or the Mock Astrologer, a Comedy (1668/1668)
- Tyrannick Love, or the Royal Martyr, a Tragedy (1668 or 1669/1670)
- The Conquest of Granada by the Spaniards, a Tragedy, Part I & Part II (1669 or 1670/1672)
- Marriage à la mode, a Comedy (1673/1673)
- The Assignation, or Love in a Nunnery, a Comedy (1672/1673)
- Amboyna; or the Cruelties of the Dutch to the English Merchants, a Tragedy (1673/1673)
- The Mistaken Husband, a Comedy (1674/1675)
- Aureng-zebe, a Tragedy (1676/1676)
- All for Love, or the World Well Lost, a Tragedy (1678/1678)
- Mr. Limberham; or, the Kind Keeper, or Mr. Limberham, a Comedy (1678/1680)
- Oedipus, a Tragedy (1678 or 1679/1679), with Nathaniel Lee
- Troilus and Cressida, or Truth found too Late, a Tragedy (1679/1679)
- The Spanish Friar, or the Double Discovery (1681/1681)
- The Duke of Guise, a Tragedy (1682/1683), with Nathaniel Lee
- Don Sebastian, a Tragedy (1690/1690)
- Amphitryon, or the Two Sosias, a Comedy (1690/1690)
- Cleomenes, the Spartan Hero, a Tragedy (1692/1692)
- Love Triumphant, or Nature will Prevail, a Tragedy (1693 or 1694/1693 or 1694)

=== Poetry ===
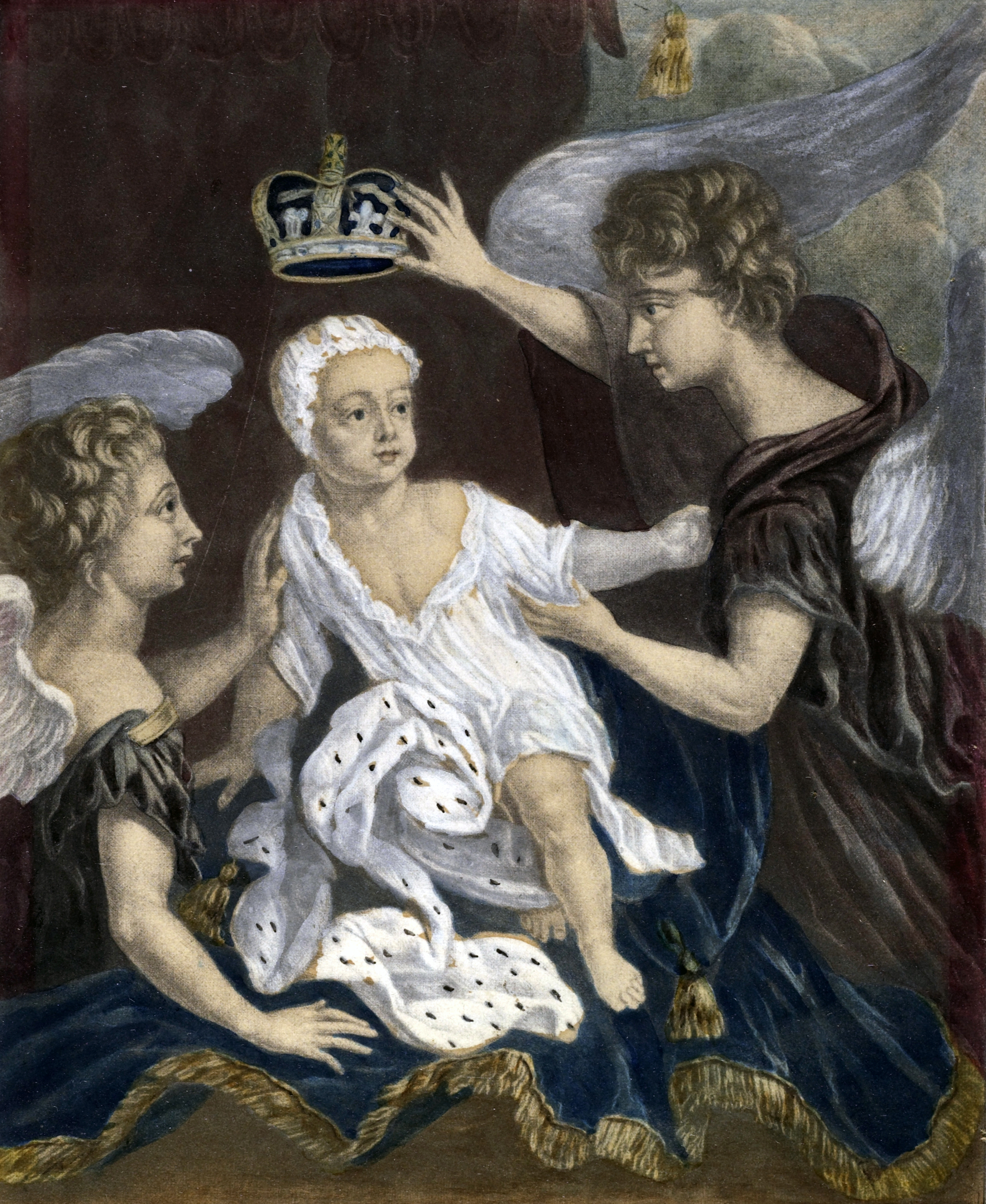
The infant Prince of Wales whose birth Dryden celebrated in Britannia Rediviva

- Astraea Redux, 1660
- Annus Mirabilis, 1667
- Absalom and Achitophel, 1681
- Mac Flecknoe, 1682
- Religio Laici, 1682
- To the Memory of Mr. Oldham, 1684
- Threnodia Augustalis, 1685
- The Hind and the Panther, 1687
- A Song for St. Cecilia's Day, 1687
- Alexander's Feast, 1697

=== Operas ===
- The State of Innocence, and Fall of Man, an Opera (/1674)
- Albion and Albanius, an Opera (1685/1685)
- King Arthur, or the British Worthy, a Dramatic Opera (1691/1691)

=== Essay ===
- Essay of Dramatick Poesie, 1668

=== Translation ===
- Fables, Ancient and Modern, 1700 (including Palamon and Arcite)

Court offices
Preceded by William Davenant	English Poet Laureate; 1668–1689	Succeeded by Thomas Shadwell
Preceded by James Howell	English Historiographer Royal; 1670–1689	Succeeded by Thomas Shadwell
