= Ben Jonson folios =

Ben Jonson's bibliography collection

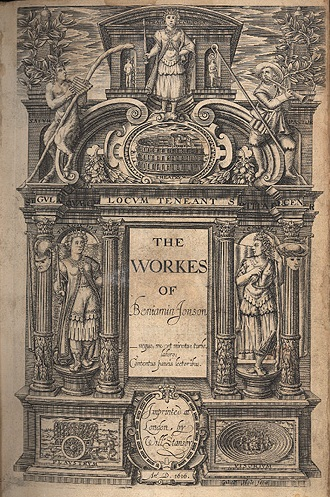
Title page of The Workes of Benjamin Jonson (1616), the first folio publication that included stage plays.

Ben Jonson (c. 11 June 1572 – c. 16 August 1637) collected his plays and other writings into a book he titled The Workes of Benjamin Jonson. In 1616 it was printed in London in the form of a folio. Second and third editions of his works were published posthumously in 1640 and 1692.

These editions of Ben Jonson's works were a crucial development in the publication of English Renaissance drama. The first folio collection, The Workes of Benjamin Jonson, treated stage plays as serious works of literature and stood as a precedent for other play collections that followed—notably the First Folio of Shakespeare's plays in 1623, the first Beaumont and Fletcher folio in 1647, and other collections that were important in preserving the dramatic literature of the age.

== The first folio, 1616 ==
The Workes of Benjamin Jonson, the first Jonson folio of 1616, printed and published by William Stansby and sold through bookseller Richard Meighen, contained nine plays all previously published, two works of non-dramatic poetry, thirteen masques, and six "entertainments".

- Plays:
  - Every Man in His Humour
  - Every Man out of His Humour
  - Cynthia's Revels
  - The Poetaster
  - Sejanus His Fall
  - Volpone
  - Epicoene, or the Silent Woman
  - The Alchemist
  - Catiline His Conspiracy
- Poetry:
  - Epigrams
  - The Forest
- Masques:
  - The Masque of Blackness
  - The Masque of Beauty
  - Hymenaei
  - The Hue and Cry After Cupid
  - The Masque of Queens
  - The Speeches at Prince Henry's Barriers
  - Oberon, the Faery Prince
  - Love Freed from Ignorance and Folly
  - Love Restored
  - A Challenge at Tilt, at a Marriage
  - The Irish Masque at Court
  - Mercury Vindicated from the Alchemists
  - The Golden Age Restored
- Entertainments:
  - The King's Entertainment in Passing to His Coronation [The Coronation Triumph]
  - A Panegyre, on the Happy Entrance of James
  - A Particular Entertainment of the Queen and Prince (at Althorp) [The Satyr]
  - A Private Entertainment of the King and Queen (on May-Day) [The Penates]
  - The Entertainment of the Two Kings (of Great Britain and Denmark) [The Hours]
  - An Entertainment of King James and Queen Anne

The first five of the masques, from The Masque of Blackness through The Masque of Queens, had been printed previously; as had A Panegyre, on the Happy Entrance of James and the Epigrams.

== The abortive 1631 addition ==
In 1631 Jonson planned a second volume to be added to the 1616 folio, a collection of later-written works to be published by Robert Allot. Jonson, however, became dissatisfied with the quality of the printing (by John Beale), and cancelled the project. Three plays were set into type for the projected collection, and printings of those typecasts were circulated—though whether they were sold commercially or distributed privately by Jonson is unclear. The three plays are:

- Bartholomew Fair
- The Devil Is an Ass
- The Staple of News

Allot died in 1635; in the 1637–39 period, the rights to Jonson's works were involved in a complex legal dispute between Philip Chetwinde, the second husband of Allot's widow, and stationers Andrew Crooke and John Legatt. Crooke and Legatt believed they owned the rights to the works.

== The second folio, 1640/1 ==
Two folio collections of Jonsonian works were issued in 1640-41. The first, printed by Richard Bishop for Andrew Crooke, was a 1640 reprint of the 1616 folio with corrections and emendations; it has sometimes been termed "the second edition of the first folio." The second volume was edited by Jonson's literary executor Sir Kenelm Digby, and published by Richard Meighen, in co-operation with Chetwinde. That volume contained later works, most of them unpublished or uncollected previously—seven plays (including the three printed in 1631), two of them incomplete, and fifteen masques, plus miscellaneous pieces. In the Digby/Meighen volume—identified on its title page as "the Second Volume" of Jonson's works—the varying dates (1631, 1640, 1641) in some of the texts, and what editor William Savage Johnson once called "irregularity in contents and arrangement in different copies," have caused significant confusion.

- Plays:
  - Bartholomew Fair
  - The Staple of News
  - The Devil Is an Ass
  - The Magnetic Lady
  - A Tale of a Tub
  - The Sad Shepherd (unfinished)
  - Mortimer His Fall (fragment)
- Masques:
  - Christmas, His Masque
  - A Masque Presented in the House of Lord Hay
  - The Vision of Delight
  - Pleasure Reconciled to Virtue
  - For the Honour of Wales
  - News from the New World Discovered in the Moon
  - A Masque of the Metamorphos'd Gypsies
  - The Masque of Augurs
  - Time Vindicated to Himself and to His Honours
  - Neptune's Triumph for the Return of Albion
  - Pan's Anniversary, or The Shepherd's Holiday
  - The Masque of Owls
  - The Fortunate Isles, and Their Union
  - Love's Triumph Through Callipolis
  - Chloridia: Rites to Chloris and Her Nymphs
  - The King's Entertainment at Welbeck
  - Love's Welcome at Bolsover
- Miscellaneous:
  - Underwoods
  - Horace, His Art of Poetry
  - The English Grammar
  - Timber, or Discoveries

== The third folio, 1692 ==
The 1692 single-volume third folio was printed by Thomas Hodgkin and published by a syndicate of booksellers—the title page lists H[enry] Herringman, E. Brewster, T. Bassett, R. Chiswell, M. Wotton, and G. Conyers. The third folio added two works to the previous total: the play The New Inn, and Leges Convivales.

Two other works by Jonson were left out of the 17th-century folios but added to later editions: the plays The Case is Altered and Eastward Ho (the latter written with Marston and George Chapman).
