= When Jones' Ale was New =

English folk song

"When Jones' Ale Was New"
- English Folk Song
- Other name: "Joan's Ale Is New", etc.
- Catalogue: Roud 139
- Genre: Drinking song
- Written: 1500s: England
- Publisher: Broadside

"When Jones' Ale Was New" (Roud 139) is an English folk song about men of various trades drinking at an ale-house or tavern. Other titles include "Joan's Ale is New" and "When Johnson's Ale Was New". Originating in the 16th century CE it has been collected frequently from traditional singers in England, and has been found occasionally in Scotland and the USA. It has evolved over the years, and is popular as a chorus song in folk clubs in England.

== Synopsis ==
In the first verse "three jolly good fellows Came over the hills together" to join a "jovial crew" presumably in an inn or alehouse. They order beer and sherry "to help them over the hills so merry, When Jones' ale was new".

Then various tradesmen arrive, often with the tools or equipment associated with their occupations. Each says, or does something to represent his profession. The number of trades varies, and some versions reflect important occupations local to the singer or publisher. The order in which they arrive also varies.

The first to come in was a soldier and no captain ever looked bolder.
His gun on his right shoulder, his good broadsword he drew.
He said he’d fight with all his might
Before old England should be drunk dry;
And so they spent a rowdy night
When Johnson’s ale was new.

(Sometimes the soldier kisses the landlady's daughter "between cheek and chin", thus ensuring good service and a steady supply of ale).

or

Now, the first to come in was a dyer; he sat himself down by the fire,
He sat himself down by the fire for to join in the jovial crew.
And he sat himself down with a good grace
For the chimney breast was his own place,
And here he could drink and dye his old face,
When Jones's ale was new, my boys, when Jones's ale was new.

In the Copper Family version, "The Jovial Tradesmen" from rural Sussex:

The first to come in was the ploughman with sweat all on his brow,
Up with the lark at the break of day he guides the speedy plough.
He drives his team, how they do toil
O'er hill and valley to turn the soil,
When Jones's ale was new, my boys, when Jones's ale was new.

(The Copper Family version also includes verses introducing a blacksmith and a scytheman, both important occupations in an agricultural village).

Very often, one of the arrivals is a tinker, who has been a key figure since the first broadside versions:

The next to come in was a tinker,
And he was no small beer drinker (x2)
To join our jovial crew.
Have you got any old pots and pans or kettles to fettle?
My rivets are made of the very best metal,
And all your holes I will very soon settle

In some versions a mason arrives, whose "hammer needed facing" (presumably the reason for his journey). He wishes " every church and steeple would fall, So there would be work for masons all". A hatter, or a thatcher ("No man couldn't be much fatter"), also appears from time to time.

In the broadsides, the last arrival is often a rag-man, and in the last verse his bag, of rags, is often burned.

In a version commonly sung in English folk clubs there is a chorus:

And they ordered their pints of beer and bottles of sherry,
To carry them over the hills so merry,
To carry them over the hills so merry,
When Jone's ale was new, my boys, when Jone's ale was new.

== History ==
=== Broadsides and early printed versions ===
A publication titled "Jones Ale is New" was placed on the Stationers' Register in 1594. Ben Jonson mentioned the song in 1633 in his play A Tale of a Tub, and broadside versions survive from a decade or so later (1644-1680). The song was reprinted in different versions by many broadside publishers for over two hundred years.

The main difference between broadside versions over the years is that the cast of characters is thinned out, and to some extent varied. In a broadside published between 1644 and 1680 there is a tinker, a cobbler, a broom-man, a rag-man, a peddler, a hatter, a tailor, a shoe-maker, a weaver, a silk-man and a glover, as well as a Dutchman and a Welshman, who are the butts of mild racial stereotyping. In one 1863 broadside the personnel are reduced to a soldier, a hatter, a dyer, a tinker, a tailor and a rag man (though there are already three tradesmen, introduced in the first verse, whose professions are unspecified). In a broadside published by T. Rae, of Sunderland, Co. Durham, under the title "The Jovial Crew", the hatter, dyer and rag man are replaced by a sailor, pit man, and a keelman (boat man), all local occupations to do with the coal trade.

A text of the song was published in "Ancient Poems, Ballads and Songs of the Peasantry of England" by Robert Bell and James Henry Dixon, in 1857.

=== Versions collected from traditional singers ===
46 versions have been collected from 24 English counties, 2 from Scotland and 6 from the USA. At least one version was collected in Australia, and a parody published in "The Australasian" newspaper in 1912.

== Recordings ==
=== Field recordings ===
Recordings by the Suffolk singer Spud Bailey, the Sussex singers Bob and Ron Copper, the Shropshire singer Fred Jordan, and the Norfolk singer Walter Pardon, are available online at the British Library Sound Archive. Peter Kennedy recorded Gloucestershire singer Harry Illes in 1957.

A version collected from "Sailor Dad" Hunt of Marion, Virginia, by John A Lomax in 1941 was released on a Library of Congress LP, American Sea Songs and Shanties.

=== Recordings by revival singers and groups ===
A L Lloyd, Martin Wyndham-Read, John Kirkpatrick and Danny Spooner have all recorded versions.

The title of a version by The Kipper Family "When Peculiar Ale was New", may be a reference to Theakston's Old Peculiar, a popular real ale.

== Discussion ==
A. L. Lloyd said that this song was sung at Easter by “Jolly-boys” or “Pace-eggers”:

"Here and there at Easter time, the “Jolly-boys” or “Pace-eggers” go from house to house, singing songs and begging for eggs. They wear clownish disguises: the hunch-backed man, the long-nosed man, the fettered prisoner, the man-woman etc. Johnson's Ale (or John's or Joan's) is one of their favourite songs. Whether the drinking song comes from the pace-egging version or the other way round, we do not know. It is an old song. Ben Johnson knew it and mentioned it in his 16th century Tale of a Tub. Its qualities are durable, for it has altered little in 350 years. It appeals most to those who are most elevated." (Sleeve notes to A L Lloyd's 1956 LP "English Drinking Songs")

Annie G. Gilchrist collected a version sung by the Overton, Lancashire, Jolly Boys titled "When John's Sail Was New", which as well as many of the usual suspects (soldier, tinkler (sic), cobbler, mason and the poor rag-man), include a "musseller", another local occupation.

The next he is a musseller,
With his cram upon his showlder.
What man may look more bowlder
To join a jofull crew?
He says he'll pike all mussells and kewins
Before t'tide comes over town-skeear
When John's sail was new, my boys,
When John's sail was new.

(A cram is a mussel rake, kewins are periwinkles, and the town-skeear is a local mussel bank).

Ms Gilchrist noted that all the pace-egging songs were essentially lists of characters.
