= News from the New World Discovered in the Moon =

Play written by Ben Jonson

News from the New World Discovered in the Moon was a Jacobean era masque, written by Ben Jonson; it was first performed before King James I on 7 January 1620, with a second performance on 29 February the same year. Jonson's text comments on significant recent developments in astronomy and journalism. The text of the masque was first published in the second folio collection of Jonson's works in 1641.

== Astronomy ==
The masque refers to the discoveries of features on the Moon by contemporaneous astronomers – Galileo Galilei most famous among them – using the earliest telescopes. Their observations of mountain ranges and other geographic and geological features on the Moon's surface was interpreted as equivalent to the discovery of a "new world" – as in two later works by John Wilkins, The Discovery of a World in the Moon (1638) and A Discourse Concerning a New Planet (1640).

== Journalism ==
Jonson combined these new discoveries, and this perception of a new frontier of knowledge, with the innovative contemporary climate in the dissemination of news. The later Jacobean era was the time when the first English-language newspapers and news agencies were coming into being. Jonson expressed his skeptical attitude toward these developments in several works written in this period, most notably in The Staple of News (1625), but also here in his 1620 masque. (Jonson even recast some of the masque's prose into verse for the play.)

== The show ==
Jonson opens his masque with a conversation among two heralds, a printer, a chronicler, and a factor (a kind of columnist or correspondent). All are in some sense in the news business, though their approaches differ; the traditional heralds are startled by the capitalist assumptions of the printer, who asks them the cost-price of their news. The characters discuss a number of contemporary issues, culminating in the news from the Moon – which allows for satire on a range of subjects. The Moon is described as "an earth inhabited...With navigable seas and rivers...forests, parks, coney-ground, meadow-pasture, what not?" With all the similarities between Earth and Moon, though, there are differences; the Moon's denizens have no spoken language, rather communicating by signs – which renders all the lawyers mute. They also have no tailors; as a result, the lunar "self-lovers" have all died.

This conversation climaxes in the anti-masque, which is a dance of "Volatees," a race of lunar bird-men. The serious portion of the masque follows, in which the "scene opens" to disclose the principal masquers, led by Prince Charles, who descend, "shake off their icicles," and dance, to the accompaniment of music and song. The masque also features the inevitable lavish praise of King James.

The lunar bird-men derive from the True History of Lucian, perhaps through the medium of Rabelais' Pantagruel.

== Modern music ==
The modern composer Theodore Antoniou wrote incidental music for the masque; his score was premiered on 30 November 1978, at a performance in Athens, Greece.

== Sources ==
- Brown, Huntington. Rabelais in English Literature. Cambridge, MA, Harvard University Press, 1933.
- Frank, Joseph. The Beginnings of the English Newspaper, 1620–1660. Cambridge, MA, Harvard University Press, 1961
- Logan, Terence P., and Denzell S. Smith, eds. The New Intellectuals: A Survey and Bibliography of Recent Studies in English Renaissance Drama. Lincoln, NE, University of Nebraska Press, 1977.
- Sanders, Julie. Ben Jonson's Theatrical Republics. London, Palgrave Macmillan, 1998.
- Somerville, C. John. The News Revolution in England: Cultural Dynamics of Daily Information. Oxford, Oxford University Press, 1996.
