= A Tale of a Tub (play) =

Play written by Ben Jonson

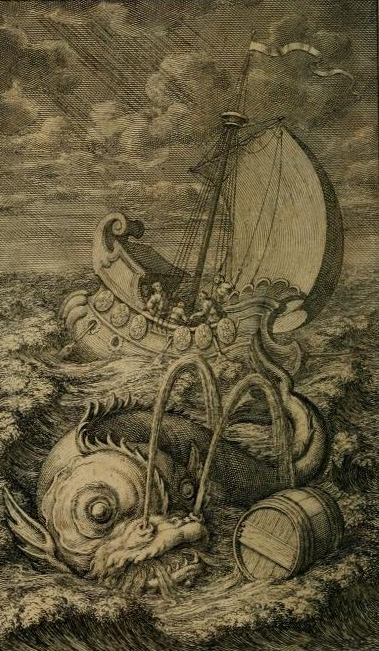

A Tale of a Tub is a Caroline era stage play, a comedy written by Ben Jonson. The last of his plays to be staged during his lifetime, A Tale of a Tub was performed in 1633 and published in 1640 in the second folio of Jonson's works.

== History ==
The play was licensed for publication by Sir Henry Herbert, the Master of the Revels, on 7 May 1633, and acted by Queen Henrietta's Men at the Cockpit Theatre; it was the only one of Jonson's post-1614 plays not premiered by the King's Men. The play was also performed at Court on 14 January 1634, before King Charles I and Queen Henrietta Maria – though it was not well received.

Scholars are divided on the date of authorship of the play. Some judge it to be an early work, first composed perhaps around 1596, that Jonson later revised not long before its 1633 production. Recent opinion holds that the Jonson wrote the play in the era when it premiered, the early 1630s, and that its apparently archaic aspects are deliberate artistic choices on the author's part.

For modern critics and scholars, a primary focus of interest in the play is Jonson's ridicule of Inigo Jones as "In-and-In Medlay". (The 1633 licence for the play states that passages ridiculing Jones as "Vitruvius Hoop" were to be struck out. Jonson seems to have complied ... merely to replace the Hoop material with the Medlay material.) Jonson had nourished a long-standing grudge against Jones, feeling that the architect had always received too much credit for the success of the Court masques that were written by Jonson but had their scenery, costumes, and stage effects designed by Jones. His ridicule of Jones runs from Bartholomew Fair, where Jones in Lanthorn Leatherhead (1614), through Neptune's Triumph for the Return of Albion (1624) and The Staple of News (1626). Jonson further satirised Jones as "Colonel Iniquo Vitruvius" in his 1634 masque Love's Welcome at Bolsover.

In addition to the Medlay character, the play features Diogenes Scriben, a bad poet and a pretended descendant of the Classical Diogenes. Commentators have speculated on intended real-life identities for this satirical figure, though no consensus has been achieved. The play is largely written in dialect; scholars have disputed the accuracy of Jonson's efforts in this regard.

== Synopsis ==
The plot, which unfolds on St. Valentine's Day, concerns the inept attempts of a variety of suitors to win the hand of Audrey Turfe, the daughter of a Middlesex constable. To break Audrey's engagement to John Clay the tilemaker, Squire Tub, a romantic rival, has the man falsely accused of theft. As Constable Turfe pursues the innocent man, yet another suitor, Justice Preamble, plays a comparable ruse against Squire Tub. All told, Audrey is chased after by four separate suitors, and apparently she has no particular preference among them. (She hesitates to accept Squire Tub, however, because of the social gap between them: "He's too fine for me, and has a Lady / Tub to his mother.") Amid the disorder, Pol-Marten, Lady Tub's usher, marries Audrey before others realise it. Their marriage is celebrated with a wedding masque, also titled "A Tale of a Tub", which retells the story of the play. (In the colloquial usage of the time, a "tale of a tub" is the same as "a cock and bull story.")

Jonson, here as often elsewhere in his plays, borrows elements from the Classical plays of Aristophanes and Plautus. The play was published with a motto from Catullus: Inficeto est inficetior rure ("What is crude anywhere is still cruder in the country").
