= Lovers Made Men =

1617 play by Ben Jonson

Lovers Made Men, alternatively titled The Masque of Lethe or The Masque at Lord Hay's, was a Jacobean era masque, written by Ben Jonson, designed by Inigo Jones, and with music composed by Nicholas Lanier. It was performed on Saturday 22 February 1617, and was significant in the development and acceptance of opera in seventeenth-century England.

== Background ==
The Lord Hay in question was James Hay, 1st Earl of Carlisle, one of the early favorites of King James I. Through 1616 Hay had been involved in a major diplomatic embassy to the court of Henri IV in Paris, where Hay had negotiated a potential marriage between James's son and heir Prince Charles, the future Charles I, and a daughter of the French king. (The negotiations were not fruitful in 1616, though a decade later Charles would marry Henri's daughter Henrietta Maria of France.) Hay's embassy was characterized by extraordinary lavish banquets, masques, processions and shows of all types – a pattern of indulgence that continued when Hay returned to Britain. Lovers Made Men was one of the shows of this period; Lord Hay used it to welcome and entertain the French Ambassador, the Baron de Tour. The performance of the masque was organized for Lord Hay by Jonson's patron Lucy Russell, Countess of Bedford.

== The show ==
As the subtitle of the work indicates, Jonson set his masque on the shores of the river Lethe in the underworld of ancient Greek mythology. As the masque begins, Charon the ferryman has just dropped off a group of human figures, "certain imagined ghosts," to be received by Mercury. The Fates, however, complain that these people are not actually dead; they have been deluded through the influence of Cupid to think that they have "drown'd in Love." By drinking the waters of Lethe, the deluded lovers paradoxically forget their Cupid-imposed delusions and return to mental health. Thus the lovers are "made men" once again.

The masque is a relatively brief work, and featured only a single perspective stage set; by Inigo Jones's standards of masque design, it was a fairly spare production.

Jonson's masque ends with a reconciliation of love and wisdom. Another masque writer, Robert White, took a different tack in his Cupid's Banishment, produced later in 1617; in his work, as the title indicates, Cupid is regarded as too disruptive an influence to be accepted. Jonson in turn may have answered White's masque in his Pleasure Reconciled to Virtue (1618).

== The music ==
The most notable aspect of the masque was its musical form. "The whole masque was sung after the Italian manner stylo recitativo, by Master Nicholas Lanier; who ordered and made both the scene and the music." The claim is controversial; it does not occur in the original 1617 quarto publication of Jonson's text, but only in the 1641 second folio.

Sir William Davenant's The Siege of Rhodes (1656) is widely acclaimed as "the first English opera;" but Davenant's work had several precursors. If Lanier's Lovers Made Men featured through-and-through recitatives, it would certainly qualify as one. Nicholas Lanier's 1628 musical setting for Marlowe's Hero and Leander may have been a comparable work; Lanier's music for these works has not survived the centuries.

== Publication ==
As noted above, Jonson's text for Lovers Made Men was published in quarto soon after its 1617 staging. A second quarto was issued in 1622, and the text was included in the second folio collection of Jonson's works in 1641.
