= Mercury Vindicated from the Alchemists =

1615 masque by Ben Jonson

Mercury Vindicated from the Alchemists at Court is a Jacobean-era masque, written by Ben Jonson and designed by Inigo Jones. It was performed at Whitehall Palace on Twelfth Night, 6 January 1615. King James I liked it so much that he ordered a repeat performance the following Sunday, 8 January.

The masque was initially published in the first folio collection of Jonson's works in 1616, and was included in the collected works from that point on.

== The show ==
The masque portrays the god Mercury driving out a crew of alchemists that have abused his nature. The anti-masque, set in an alchemical laboratory, featured twelve alchemist figures, and twelve "imperfect creatures" wearing helmets shaped like alembics. After their dances, they were dispersed by the intervention of the god, and the scene changed to a "glorious bower," in which Mercury, along with Prometheus and a personification of Nature, ushered in the dance of the masquing courtiers, who were twelve "Sons of Nature."

For source material for this work, "Jonson drew on Sendivogius's satirical Dialogus Mercurii, Alchymistae et Naturae...." Jonson treats alchemists as charlatans in his text, as he does in his play The Alchemist. The words "at Court" in the full title of the work have provoked scholars to debate the actual meaning and significance of Jonson's text, since real alchemists were not particularly well represented at James's court. The work is clearly more symbolic than literal, though critics disagree on the specifics of its meaning.

== Politics ==
The masque was significant in the internal politics of the Stuart Court, in that it marked a major step in the ascension of George Villiers as the new favorite of King James. For several years, Robert Carr, 1st Earl of Somerset had held that wholly unofficial but very powerful position, as well as rising to major official posts such as Lord Chamberlain; but Somerset's role in the 1613 murder of Sir Thomas Overbury was becoming a major scandal. A Court faction opposed to Somerset—which included Lucy Russell, Countess of Bedford, the patroness of John Donne and other poets, including Ben Jonson—was actively promoting Villiers as a replacement for Robert Carr. To the date of the masque, their promotion of Villiers has not been enormously successful; Mercury Vindicated was staged, at least in the estimation of some contemporaries, with the "principal motive" of "the gracing of young Villiers and to bring him on the stage." The plan was eventually successful, and Villiers, as the new Duke of Buckingham, replaced Somerset as the royal favorite, not merely through the remainder of James's reign but into the reign of his son and successor Charles I.

== Dating ==
Scholars have disputed the order in which two of the Jonson-Jones masques were performed at Court. Traditionally, Mercury Vindicated was assigned to the 1614–15 Christmas holiday season, and The Golden Age Restored to the following 1615–16 season. C. H. Herford and Percy Simpson, in their edition of Jonson's works, argued that the two masques had been chronologically transposed in the 1616 Jonson folio, and that TGAR actually preceded Mercury Vindicated. Their argument received some general acceptance for a time, but was refuted by later researchers.

The masques in the 1616 folio appear to be arranged in a consistent chronological order; Mercury Vindicated is second to last in the volume, and TGAR is the final work included. Recent scholarship tends to rely on the implications of the original text, and treats the two masques as presented in that order.
