= On My First Sonne =

Poem

"On My First Sonne" is a poem by Ben Jonson, written after the death of his seven-year-old son (Benjamin) in the 1603 London plague. It was first published in 1616. The poem, a reflection on a father's pain in his young son's death, is rendered more acutely moving when compared with Jonson's other, usually more cynical or mocking, poetry. It is clearly different from the poem written about his daughter's death, which does not show the loss on such an intense level.
