= The Golden Age Restored =

Play

The Golden Age Restored was a Jacobean era masque, written by Ben Jonson and designed by Inigo Jones; it was performed on 1 January and 6 January 1616, almost certainly at Whitehall Palace.

== The show ==
Somewhat less is known about this masque than others of the Jacobean era, since none of Jones's designs for the work has survived. The twelve gentleman masquers were styled "Sons of Phoebus," and were awakened and aroused by Astraea, the goddess of Justice and of the "Golden Age" once fled and now returned, with a quartet of the great English poets of the past — Geoffrey Chaucer, John Gower, Edmund Spenser. The corresponding figures in the anti-masque were twelve "Evils," ambition, pride, avarice, etc. The speeches were "presented" by the mythological figures standard in the masque form — in this case, Pallas Athena and Astraea were the primaries. Pallas banishes the personified Iron Age, thus allowing the return of Astraea, goddess of Justice, and the restoration of the Golden Age.

A major theme of Jonson's text was the reform of a corrupt court — relevant at the time because the Stuart Court was suffering the aftermath of the scandal over the murder of Sir Thomas Overbury. King James's favorite, Robert Carr, 1st Earl of Somerset, was still awaiting trial for his role in the murder when the masque was presented, and his successor as royal favorite, George Villiers, 1st Duke of Buckingham, was moving into prominence as Carr's replacement. The King was so pleased with the masque that he had a repeat performance scheduled for the evening of Twelfth Night, a few days after the initial presentation.

== Dating ==
Scholars have disputed the order in which two of the Jonson-Jones masques were performed at Court. Traditionally, Mercury Vindicated from the Alchemists was assigned to the 1614–15 Christmas holiday season, and The Golden Age Restored to the following 1615–16 holiday season. C. H. Herford and Percy Simpson, in their edition of Jonson's works, argued that the two masques had been chronologically transposed, and that TGAR was the earlier work. Their argument received some general acceptance for a time, but was refuted by later researchers.

The masques in the 1616 folio appear to be arranged in a consistent chronological order; and The Golden Age Restored, as noted, is last. Its title page dates it to 1615 — but the English began the New Year on March 25 prior to 1751. [See: Old Style and New Style dates.] If TGAR had been performed in the previous year, it should have been dated 1614. Recent scholarship tends to rely on the implications of the original text, and treats TGAR as the later work.

The masque was performed twice, Lady Anne Clifford went to the second performance on 6 January 1616 as a guest of the Countess of Arundel.

== Publication ==
Jonson's text was published in the first folio collection of Jonson's works in 1616; it was the last work to be included in that volume. Thereafter The Golden Age Restored was included in the collected editions of Jonson's works.
