= Pan's Anniversary =

Play written by Ben Jonson

Pan's Anniversary, or The Shepherd's Holiday was a Jacobean era masque, written by Ben Jonson and designed by Inigo Jones. The date of the masque's performance at the English Court has long been in dispute: while the earliest text assigns it to 1625, mid-twentieth-century scholars placed it on 19 June 1620, the king's birthday, at the royal palace at Greenwich. More recently, Martin Butler has argued for a date of 6 January 1621.

== The show ==
The masque is set in Arcadia, in a classical pastoral setting, and opens with three nymphs and an elderly shepherd. They are quickly joined by a fencer, who engages the shepherd in a long discussion. The point of this dialogue is to portray the fencer, and the martial spirit he represents, as exaggerated and rather clownish, in keeping with the pacifistic orientation of King James I. The two anti-masques feature Boeotians and Thebans (Grecian Thebes was the capital of Boeotia), while the masque proper reveals the principal masquers clustered around a "fountain of light" before they descend to dance. The intended contrast was between the pastoral peace and simplicity of Arcadia and the warlike spirit of Thebes. (The musicians who provided the accompaniment were costumed as priests of Pan.) Jonson experimented with an unusual structure in this work, placing the anti-masques both before and after the main masque. James was hailed and praised in the guise of Pan.

One critic has categorized it this way: "Exquisitely artificial though the masque may formally be, it is infused with the colors, scents, and sounds of a very concrete natural world." A more jaded view is that the work "is a competent but not particularly exciting masque."

== Publication ==
Jonson's text for Pan's Anniversary was first published in the second folio collection of Jonson's works in 1641, though it was mis-dated to 1625 and placed out of the proper chronological order of the masques in that volume. The title page for the work is unique among Jonson's masques in placing Inigo Jones's name before Jonson's. Some of Jones's designs for the masque's sets survive; they consist, unsurprisingly, of forest and mountain scenes typical of the pastoral form.

== Modern production ==
Pan's Anniversary is one of the rare masques from the early Stuart era to have received a twentieth-century production. An April 1905 production at Stratford-upon-Avon, part of a Shakespeare Birthday Celebration, featured incidental music composed by Gustav Holst and Ralph Vaughan Williams, and a student performance was given at Columbia University Teachers' College on 27 April 1916.

== See also ==
- Pan in popular culture

== Sources ==
- Butler, Martin. "Ben Jonson's Pan's Anniversary and the Politics of Early Stuart Pastoral." English Literary Renaissance 22.3 (1992), pp. 369–404.
- Kennedy, Michael. The Works of Ralph Vaughan Williams. Oxford, Clarendon Press, 1992.
- Logan, Terence P., and Denzell S. Smith, eds. The New Intellectuals: A Survey and Bibliography of Recent Studies in English Renaissance Drama. Lincoln, NE, University of Nebraska Press, 1977.
- Orgel, Stephen, ed. Ben Jonson: The Complete Masques. New Haven, Yale University Press, 1969.
- Rutledge, Douglas F., ed. Ceremony and Text in the Renaissance. Newark, DE, University of Delaware Press, 1996.
- Salzman, Paul. Literary Culture in Jacobean England: Reading 1621. London, Palgrave Macmillan, 2002.
- Torrance, Robert Mitchell, ed. Encompassing Nature: A Sourcebook. Washington, DC, Counterpoint Press, 1999.
