= Time Vindicated to Himself and to His Honours =

Play

Time Vindicated to Himself and to his Honours was a late Jacobean era masque, written by Ben Jonson and with costumes, sets, and stage effects designed by Inigo Jones. James's son and heir Prince Charles led the dances of the principal masquers, as he had in several previous masques at the Stuart Court.

Originally scheduled for Twelfth Night in 1623, its performance was delayed by an illness of the King, James I; the masque was staged on Sunday 19 January, in the Banqueting House at Whitehall Palace. (Coincidentally, Jonson's play The Alchemist had been staged at Court on 1 January.)

== The sets ==
Jones's elaborate stage set featured a double change of scenery: the first set was a perspective scene of Whitehall itself, which prominently featured Jones's recently completed Banqueting House – a sort of self-advertisement on the part of the architect. That scene changed to a cloudscape that contained the principal masquers, which in turn yielded to a forest setting.

== The show ==
Jonson's text has an unusual cast, even by the standards of the masque form. It opens with the entrance of a personified Fame, accompanied by "the Curious" – who are three, "the Eyed, the Eared, and the Nosed." These three personifications of the sense organs were apparently costumed with multiple iterations of their specific parts; in one of his (or its?) speeches, the Eyed refers to his (or its) four eyes. Their conversation on the nature of Fame and Time is broken in upon by Chronomastix, a satyr with a whip or scourge. The main topic of this scene is the climate of political scandalmongering, satire, and libel that was considered epidemic at the time.

Two anti-masques ensue; the first is of "Mutes," in which the Curious adore Chronomastix and carry him out like a hero (though Fame sits out the dance); and the second is a dance of jugglers and tumblers who are ushered in by the Cat with the fiddle (from the Hey-diddle-diddle nursery rhyme). Once the tomfoolery is done, the serious portion of the masque begins: Saturn, the god of time, and Venus are shown with their votaries, followed by Cupid, Diana, and Hippolytus. The masquers are revealed, and they descend from their cloud and dance, performing "braules, corantos, and galliards."

== Jonson vs. Jones ==
Though Jonson expressed the appropriate establishmentarian disapproval of libel and scandal and political pamphleteering, the mere fact that he broached this increasingly delicate subject was questioned; the masque was not well received by its courtly audience. (British popular culture was then moving into a stage of increasingly aggressive religious and political controversy, especially involving Puritan commentators like William Prynne, who were deeply hostile to the reigning monarchy and the dominant social order.)

Jonson also earned disapproval for parodying the then-significant, now-forgotten poet George Wither in the figure of Chronomastix. Wither enjoyed the patronage of both the King and the Lord Chamberlain, the Earl of Pembroke. A little more than a month after the staging of Time Vindicated, James consoled Wither by granting him and his heirs a 51-year patent (or copyright) on his Hymns and Songs of the Church, a translation of Biblical lyrics for musical settings by Orlando Gibbons, and potentially a very lucrative work.

Conversely, Jones's share in the masque was praised and highly regarded, according to a contemporary: "They say it was performed reasonably well both for the device, and for the handsome conveyance and variety of the scene whereof Inigo Jones hath the whole commendation." This second-hand report is somewhat countered by the more exacting eye-witness verdict of the Venetian ambassador, who judged it "a spectacle of some pomp and beauty but not attaining the royal standard of excellence."

== Publication ==
The text of Time Vindicated was published in quarto in 1623, soon after its performance, as was not uncommon with the Court masques of the era. The text was reprinted in the second folio collection of Jonson's works in 1641, and thereafter was included in the collected editions of the poet's works. Unusually, the masque was reprinted in a separate octavo edition in 1756.
