= Love Restored =

Play written by Ben Jonson

Love Restored was a Jacobean era masque, written by Ben Jonson; it was performed on Twelfth Night, 6 January 1612, and first published in 1616. The Dictionary of National Biography says of the masque, "This vindication of love from wealth is a defense of the court revels against the strictures of the puritan city."

Compared to Jonson's previous masques for the Stuart Court, Love Restored was unusual in several respects. Love Restored could be called a "budget" masque, in that its total bill was only in the hundreds of pounds rather than the thousands; specifically, it cost only £280. In this it was different from Jonson's earlier masques like The Masque of Blackness and others, though similar to the immediately preceding masque, Love Freed from Ignorance and Folly. Even more unusually, Love Restored was staged without the participation of Inigo Jones, who had designed the costumes, sets, and stage effects of the prior masques. Aristocratic amateurs of the Court danced ten roles, personifications of Honour, Courtesy, Valour, etc. Speaking parts were filled by "the King's Servants," professional actors of the King's Men.

== Plot ==
The masque is dominated by a long conversation among Robin Goodfellow and other mythical figures. "Masquerado," the presenter, apologizes for the lack of music and the generally meager values of the presentation. Plutus, the god of wealth, is pretending to be Cupid, and Robin exposes him and offers to lead Masquerado to the real god. Robin also narrates the difficulties he had in gaining entry to the masque – he had to "go through more than forty disguises" in his attempt to get in – a passage that has been taken to indicate the tactics that people actually employed to gain entry to masque performances in the era.

== Publication ==
The text of the masque was published in the first folio collection of Jonson's works in 1616, and was reprinted in the second folio of 1640 and in later collections.
