= Ian Donaldson (academic) =

Australian literary scholar (1935–1920)

Charles Ian Edward Donaldson
- Born: 6 May 1935
- Died: 18 March 2020 (aged 84)
- Citizenship: Australia
- Education: University of Melbourne: Magdalen College, Oxford; Merton College, Oxford
- Scientific career
- Workplaces: Australian National University: University of Edinburgh; University of Cambridge

Charles Ian Edward Donaldson, FBA, FRSE, FAHA (6 May 1935 – 18 March 2020), commonly known as Ian Donaldson, was an Australian literary scholar who specialised in the playwright, poet and actor Ben Jonson.

Educated at the University of Melbourne, Magdalen College, Oxford, and then Merton College, Oxford, Donaldson was a fellow in English at Wadham College, Oxford, from 1962 to 1969. He was then professor of English at the Australian National University (ANU) from 1969 to 1991, after which he was Regius Professor of Rhetoric and English Literature at the University of Edinburgh (1991–95) and Grace 1 Professor of English at the University of Cambridge (1995–2002) and a fellow of King's College, Cambridge (1995–2005). He was then director of the Humanities Research Centre at the ANU from 2004 to 2007, and then finally a professorial fellow at the University of Melbourne from 2007 and a fellow of Trinity College, Melbourne, from 2012.

He was elected a fellow of Australian Academy of the Humanities in 1975, a fellow of the British Academy in 1993 (having previously been a corresponding fellow since 1987), and a fellow of the Royal Society of Edinburgh in 1993.

== Publications ==
- The World Upside Down: Comedy from Jonson to Fielding (Oxford: Clarendon Press, 1970)
- (editor) Ben Jonson: Poems, Oxford Standard Authors (Oxford: Oxford University Press, 1975)
- The Rapes of Lucretia: A Myth and Its Transformations (Oxford: Oxford University Press, 1982)
- (editor) Ben Jonson, Oxford Authors (Oxford: Oxford University Press, 1985)
- Jonson's Magic Houses: Essays in Interpretation (Oxford: Oxford University Press, 1997)
- Ben Jonson: A Life (Oxford: Oxford University Press, 2011)
- (editor, with David Bevington and Martin Butler) The Cambridge Edition of the Work of Ben Jonson, 7 vols (Cambridge: Cambridge University Press, 2012)
