= Thomas Wright (writer) =

English recusant and emotion theorist (1561–1624)

- Born: 1561
- Died: 1624 (aged 62–63)
- Education: Jesuit Douai Seminary; English College in Rome
- Occupations: Recusant; emotion theorist

Thomas Wright (1561–1624) was an English recusant and early emotion theorist. Wright is known for his work The Passions of the Minde in generall. Wright is a possible candidate for the priest Ben Jonson referenced during the trials for the Gunpowder Plot.

== Early life and education ==
Wright was born in York in 1561. He studied at the Jesuit Douai Seminary and the English College in Rome, then returned to England in 1595 carrying intelligence regarding Spanish military strategy.

== Career ==
Though he remained a Catholic priest, Wright left the Society of Jesus because of his English sympathies and distaste with Robert Parsons' support of plots against Queen Elizabeth. By 1596 Wright had upset Matthew Hutton, the Archbishop of York, and was imprisoned for his vocal recusancy. Wright finished Passions of the Minde shortly before his escape from prison, and published it shortly thereafter. In Passions of the Minde, Wright explores the passions and their relationship to moral psychology. Wright may be responsible for converting Ben Jonson.

== Death ==
He died in 1624.

== Works ==
Wright is ascribed:

- The Disposition or Garnishmente of the Soule.
- The Passions of the Minde in generall. By Thomas Wright,’ London, 1601, which reappeared in 1604 "corrected, enlarged, and with sundry new discourses augmented", and was reissued in 1621 and 1630. This work was dedicated to Henry Wriothesley, third earl of Southampton in the hope that he may be "delivered from inordinate passions", and had commendatory verses by B. I. (Ben Jonson).
- A Succinct Philosophicall Declaration of the Nature of Clymactericall Yeeres, occasioned by the Death of Queene Elizabeth Written by T. W[right]. Printed for T. Thorpe, London, 1604.

Another Thomas Wright, M.A., of Peterhouse, Cambridge, issued in 1685 The Glory of Gods Revenge against the Bloody and Detestable Sins of Murther and Adultery (London).

== Attribution ==
This article incorporates text from a publication now in the public domain: Lee, Sidney, ed. (1900). "Wright, Thomas (d.1624?)". Dictionary of National Biography. Vol. 63. London: Smith, Elder & Co.
