= Neptune's Triumph for the Return of Albion =

Play written by Ben Jonson

Neptune's Triumph for the Return of Albion was a Jacobean era masque, written by Ben Jonson, and designed by Inigo Jones. It is notable for the contradictory historical evidence connected with it and the confusion it caused among generations of scholars and critics.

== Context ==
The masque was intended as the major entertainment of the 1623–24 Christmas holiday season, and was scheduled to be performed on Twelfth Night, 6 January 1624. During the Jacobean era, however, attendance at the performances of the Stuart Court masques was coveted and controversial – especially among the foreign diplomats of the Court, who competed fiercely among themselves for admittance to the masques and especially for seating near the King. In the case of Neptune's Triumph, the dispute between the French and Spanish ambassadors was so intense that James I cancelled the performance.

There was more than ego or vague national pride involved: James's son and heir, the future Charles I, had returned from Spain and his fruitless quest for a marriage with the Spanish Infanta, the "Spanish match" that was a point of intense controversy in Britain at the time. His arrival back in England on 5 October 1623 is the "return of Albion" of the title. James himself had censored and approved the text of the masque; but since he had been the prime backer of the Spanish match, a masque that took a benign view of its failure was perhaps easy for the King to cancel.

== Contents ==
The masque opens with a long conversation between a poet and a cook, who represent Jonson and Jones respectively. The cook and his cookery are Jonson's satire on Jones's artistry in masque design. The poet and cook discuss their plans to represent the homecoming of Albion and his father Neptune's joy at his return from Celtiberia. The character Hippius, would represent the Duke of Buckingham.

After the anti-masque, Jones's set of the floating island of Delos is revealed, with Apollo and Mercury presenting the serious portion of the work, supported by the minor Greek sea gods Proteus, Portunus, and Saron, the gods of ports and navigation respectively. Songs and dances would have ensued, and an anti-masque of sailors.

It is possible that Jonson's unperformed masque may have influenced the most famous literary work connected with the Spanish Match, Middleton's A Game at Chess. When Jonson's text was published, in quarto in 1624 and in the second folio collection of Jonson's works in 1641, the wording of the title pages gave the impression that the masque had in fact been performed. Generations of scholars took these statements at face value, and believed that the masque had been staged.

The fact that none of his contemporaries had actually seen the masque allowed Jonson to re-use material from the text in subsequent works. Some "lyrical passages" from Neptune's Triumph re-appeared in the next year's masque The Fortunate Isles and Their Union, while comedy material from the anti-masque that satirizes Inigo Jones is employed in The Staple of News (1626).
