= The Magnetic Lady =

Play

The Magnetic Lady, or Humours Reconciled is a Caroline-era stage play, the final comedy of Ben Jonson. It was licensed for performance by Sir Henry Herbert, the Master of the Revels, on 12 October 1632, and first published in 1641, in Volume II of the second folio collection of Jonson's works.

The play was premiered by the King's Men at the Blackfriars Theatre; it was not an overt failure like The New Inn, but does not appear to have been a great success either. The play was criticised by the dramatist's long and seemingly ever-growing list of enemies, Inigo Jones being one example.

== Synopsis ==
As the subtitle indicates, The Magnetic Lady is a humours comedy, a form that Jonson had begun exploring three decades earlier and the last of the type that Jonson would write. The play is supplied with an Induction and a set of entr'actes that Jonson calls "Intermeans," through which the characters Probee and the ignorant Damplay have the play explained to them as it proceeds, by the Boy who has been left in charge of the "Poetique Shop." The focus of the play lies in the wealthy Lady Loadstone and her young, attractive, "marriageable" niece Placentia Steel. Placentia is the target of the amorous ambitions of a set of gulls and fools and hangers-on – Parson Palate, Doctor Rut, Bias, Practice the lawyer, and Sir Diaphanous Silkworm. Lady Loadstone's brother, Sir Moth Interest, is Placentia's financial trustee, and cares about little but maintaining control of her money. This crew is counterbalanced by two Jonsonian men of worth: Compass, Lady Loadstone's faithful steward, and his friend Captain Ironside.

In Lady Loadstone's household, conditions are upside down (at least in the playwright's system of values). Lady Loadstone commands her little domestic world without male rule – in the words of one critic, it is a "feminocentric environment." Yet she cannot manage her household against her obstreperous servants. The governess, Mistress Polish, the midwife, Mother Chair, and the nurse, Mistress Keep (representing the "smock-secrets" of women), are a set of females out of control – a theme that Jonson visits again and again in his works, as in the Ladies Collegiate in Epicene and the chorus of she-critics in The Staple of News.

However to describe Lady Loadstone's domestic world as 'feminocentric' is argued by some to be completely inaccurate. The very fact that Lady Loadstone is guided constantly by the advice of Master Compass, who is described by Parson Palate as 'the perfect instrument your Lady should sail by' indicates her dependence upon her male friend's guidance, as a widow in a male dominated society. She is also counselled by the Parson and the Doctor and the dowry is controlled by Sir Moth Interest. It is the machinations of Master Compass, who exposes Mistress Polish's plot and effectively wins the day in the final revelation and his supremacy of the situation. The female characters in the play are outnumbered by the male and ultimately are 'subdued' at the end in one way or another. The character of Mistress Polish is arguably one of Jonson's more interesting female characters and a challenge for any actress.

The play's action features a dinner party that is never seen onstage, but is reported by various characters. The foppish Sir Diaphanous Silkworm falls into a quarrel with the gruff soldier Captain Ironside, which causes Placentia to go into premature labour, thus revealing her illegitimate pregnancy. A complex tangle of misunderstandings is eventually unwound: fourteen years earlier, Polish switched her own infant daughter with the Lady's niece Placentia. The girl known as Placentia is actually Polish's daughter Pleasance, and the supposed Pleasance, serving as the false Placentia's maid, is the true heir. By the play's end, the two worthy and sensible men in the piece, Captain Ironside and Compass, prove themselves to be the suitable matches for aunt and niece.

== Performances ==
The play was first performed in 1632 and came under severe critical attack from Jonson's literary enemies namely Alexander Gill, Inigo Jones and Nathaniel Butter, who had long-standing feuds with Jonson. The work does not appear again until 1987, in a BBC Radio 3 adaptation to mark 350 years since Jonson's death produced by Ian Cotterell and adapted by Peter Barnes with Dilys Laye as Mistress Polish, Dinsdale Landen as Master Compass and Peter Bayliss as Sir Moth Interest. The play received its first modern stage performance in Autumn 2010 as part of the White Bear Theatre's Lost Classics Project.

== Historical Influence ==
The phrase used in English common law, for sworn oaths, "the truth, the whole truth, and nothing but the truth", appeared for the first time in writing, in the Magnetic Lady, V, x, 82.
