= Mortimer His Fall =

1641 play written by Ben Jonson

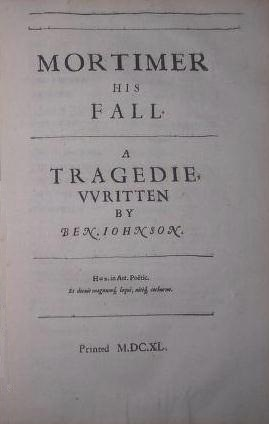
- Title page in the 1640-1 Folio of Jonson's works
- Original language: English
- Written by: Ben Jonson
- Subject: Young Edward III discovers how Roger Mortimer overthrew his father, king Edward II
- Genre: history play
- Setting: England during the minority of Edward III

Premiere
- Date: not performed

Mortimer His Fall (published 1641) is an unfinished history play by Ben Jonson, about the overthrow of Roger Mortimer, 1st Earl of March, who had become de facto ruler of England in 1327 with Isabella of France after deposing and murdering Isabella's husband Edward II of England.

The existing text of Mortimer His Fall, was printed in the 1640-1 edition of Jonson's complete works. The text comprises the "argument", or plot summary of the intended five acts, along with the complete first scene and part of the second. The complete scene is a soliloquy by Mortimer in which he is portrayed, "in the 'Machiavel' tradition", as a scheming villain. The fragmentary scene is the beginning of a dialogue between Mortimer and Queen Isabella.

== Date ==
Jonson's other historical tragedies were all written in the period 1602–4, and it has been argued that Mortimer may be identical to the play "Mortymore", referred to by Philip Henslowe in 1602, for which Henslowe provided "ij sewtes a licke" (two suits alike). However, it is generally believed that the work was a very late one, left unfinished at his death in 1637. The published version states "he dyed and left it unfinished". William Gifford described it as "the last draught of Jonson's quill".

== Style ==
The play seems to have been an attempt to move away from the traditional chronicle history plays towards a more classical form, as it was intended to have included "choruses", such as "Ladyes celebrating the worthinesse of the Queene," and "Countrey Justices and their Wives telling how they were deluded and made beleeve the old king lived." Jonson's biographer David Riggs describes it as Jonson's attempt at a "final amalgamation of the classical and native tragedy".

== Content ==
The play is set two years after the death of Edward II, when the young king Edward III begins to suspect the relationship between Mortimer and his mother. Over the course of the play, he learns the truth about what happened to his father and plans his revenge on Mortimer. The "argument" states:

The first Act comprehends Mortimers pride and securitie, raysed to the degree of an Earle, by the Queenes favour, and love. Mortimers securitie, scorne of the Nobilitie, too much familiaritie with the Queene, related by the Chorus, the report of the Kings surprizing him in his Mothers bed-chamber, a generall gladnesse, his being sent to execution.

Mortimer is identified as a vainglorious figure whose pride is the cause of his actions. Mortimer's "Senecan pride and ambition" is expressed in his soliloquy in which he glories in his new power. Thus the play begins with the words: "This Rise is made, yet! and we now stand, ranck'd, / To view about us, all that were above us!"
