= The Sad Shepherd =

Unfinished play by Ben Jonson

The Sad Shepherd: A Tale of Robin Hood
- Original language: Early Modern English
- Written by: Ben Jonson
- Genre: Pastoral tragicomedy
- Setting: Sherwood Forest

The Sad Shepherd: or, A Tale of Robin Hood is the last, incomplete play by Ben Jonson, written around 1635 and printed posthumously in 1641.

== Characters ==
- Robin Hood – the Chief Woodman, Master of the Feast
- Friar Tuck – his Chaplain and Steward
- Little John – Bow-bearer
- Scarlet, Scathlock – two Brothers, Huntsmen
- George-a-Green – Huisher of the Bower
- Much – Bailiff, or Acater
  The Guests invited
  Shepherds
  - Æglamour – the Sad
  - Clarion – the Rich
  - Lionel – the Courteous
  - Alken – the Sage
  - Karolin – the Kind
- Lorel – the Rude, a Swineherd, the Witch's Son
- Puck-Hairy, or Robin-Goodfellow – their Hind
- Reuben – the Reconciler, a devout Hermit
- Marian – Robin Hood's Lady
  Shepherdesses
  - Earine – the Beautiful
  - Mellifleur – the Sweet
  - Amie – the Gentle
- Maudlin – the Envious, the Witch of Paplewick
- Douce – the Proud, her Daughter

== Plot ==
=== Act I ===
Robin Hood, having invited all the shepherds and shepherdesses of the vale of Belvoir to a feast in the forest of Sherwood, and trusting to his beloved, maid Marian, with her woodmen, to kill him venison against the day: having left the like charge with friar Tuck, his chaplain and steward, to command the rest of his merry men to see the bower made ready, and all things in order for the entertainment: meeting with his guests at their entrance into the wood, welcomes and conducts them to his bower. Where, by the way, he receives the relation of the Sad Shepherd, Æglamour, who is fallen into a deep melancholy for the loss of his beloved Earine, reported to have been drowned in passing over the Trent, some few days before. They endeavour in what they can to comfort him: but his disease having taken such strong root, all is in vain, and they are forced to leave him. In the meantime, Marian is come from hunting with the huntsmen, where the lovers interchangeably express their loves. Robin Hood enquires if she hunted the deer at force, and what sport he made? how long he stood, and what head he bore? All which is briefly answered, with a relation of breaking him up, and the raven and her bone. The suspect had of that raven to be Maudlin, the witch of Paplewick, whom one of the huntsmen met in the morning at the rousing of the deer, and which is confirmed, by her being then in Robin Hood's kitchen, in the chimney-corner, broiling the same bit which was thrown to the raven at the quarry or fall of the deer. Marian being gone in to show the deer to some of the shepherdesses, returns instantly to the scene, discontented; sends away the venison she had killed, to her they call the witch; quarrels with her love Robin Hood, abuses him, and his guests the shepherds; and so departs, leaving them all in wonder and perplexity.

=== Act II ===
The witch Maudlin having taken the shape of Marian to abuse Robin Hood, and perplex his guests, comes forth with her daughter Douce, reporting in what confusion she had left them; defrauded them of their venison, made them suspicious each of the other; but most of all, Robin Hood so jealous of his Marian, as she hopes no effect of love would ever reconcile them; glorying so far in the extent of her mischief, as she confesses to have surprised Earine, stripped her of her garments, to make her daughter appear fine at this feast in them; and to have shut the maiden up in a tree, as her son's prize, if he could win her; or his prey, if he would force her. Her son, a rude bragging swineherd, comes to the tree to woo her (his mother and sister stepping aside to overhear him) and first boasts his wealth to her, and his possessions; which move not. Then he presents her gifts, such as himself is taken with, but she utterly shows a scorn and loathing both of him and them. His mother is angry, berates him, instructs him what to do the next time, and persuades her daughter to show herself about the bower: tells how she shall know her mother, when she is transformed, by her broidered belt. Meanwhile, the young shepherdess Amie, being kissed by Karolin, Earine's brother, falls in love; but knows not what love is: but describes her disease so innocently, that Marian pities her. When Robin Hood and the rest of his guests invited, enter to Marian, upbraiding her with sending away their venison to mother Maudlin by Scathlock, which she denies; Scathlock affirms it; but seeing his mistress weep, and to forswear it, begins to doubt his own understanding, rather than affront her farther; which makes Robin Hood and the rest to examine themselves better. But Maudlin, the witch, entering like herself, comes to thank her for her bounty; at which Marian is more angry, and more denies the deed. Scathlock enters, tells he has brought it again, and delivered it to the cook. The witch is inwardly vexed the venison is so recovered from her by the rude huntsman, and murmurs and curses; bewitches the cook, mocks poor Amie and the rest; reveals her ill nature, and is a means of reconciling them all. For the sage shepherd suspects her mischief, if she be not prevented: and so persuades them to seize on her. Whereupon Robin Hood dispatches out his woodmen to hunt and take her.

=== Act III ===
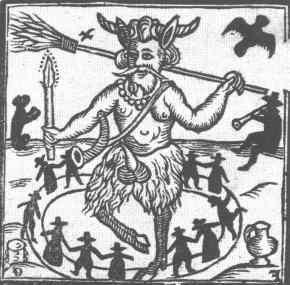
Contemporary depiction of Puck: title-page of Robin Goodfellow: His Mad Pranks and Merry Jests, 1639

Puck-Hairy reveals himself in the forest, and lists his offices, with their necessities, briefly; after which, Douce entering in the habit of Earine, is pursued by Karol; who (mistaking her at first to be his sister) questions her how she came by those garments. She answers, by her mother's gift. The Sad Shepherd coming in the while, she runs away affrighted, and leaves Karol suddenly; Æglamour thinking it to be Earine's ghost he saw, falls into a melancholic expression of his fantasy to Karol, and questions him sadly about that point, which moves compassion in Karol of his mistake still. When Clarion and Lionel enter to call Karol to Amie, Karol reports to them Æglamour's passion, with much regret. Clarion resolves to seek him. Karol to return with Lionel. By the way, Douce and her mother (in the shape of Marian) meet them, and would divert them, affirming Amie to be recovered, which Lionel wondered at to be so soon. Robin Hood enters, they tell him the relation of the witch, thinking her to be Marian; Robin suspecting her to be Maudlin, lays hold of her girdle suddenly, but she striving to get free, they both run out, and he returns with the enchanted belt broken. She following turns into her own shape, demanding the belt, but at a distance, as fearing to be seized upon again; and seeing she cannot recover it, falls into a rage, and cursing, resolving to trust to her old arts, which she calls her daughter to assist in. The shepherds, content with this discovery, go home triumphing, make the relation to Marian. Amie is gladdened with the sight of Karol, and the others. In the meantime, enters Lorel, with purpose to rape Earine, and calling her forth to that end, he by the hearing of Clarion's footing is stayed, and forced to commit her hastily to the tree again; where Clarion coming by, and hearing a voice singing, draws near to it; but Æglamour hearing it also, and knowing it to be Earine's, falls into a superstitious commendation of it; as being an angel's, and in the air; when Clarion spies a hand put forth from the tree, and makes towards it, leaving Æglamour to his wild fantasy, who quits the place: and Clarion beginning to court the hand, and caress it, there arises a mist suddenly, which darkening all the place, Clarion loses himself and the tree where Earine is enclosed, lamenting his misfortune, with the unknown nymph's misery. The air clearing, enters the witch, with her son and daughter, tells them how she had caused that late darkness, to free Lorel from surprisal, and his prey from being rescued from him: bids him look to her, and lock her up more carefully, and follow her, to assist a work she has in hand of recovering her lost girdle; which she laments the loss of with curses, execrations, wishing confusion to their feast and meeting, sends her son and daughter to gather certain simples for her purpose, and bring them to her dell. This Puck hearing, prevents, and shows her error still. The huntsmen having found her footing, follow the track, and chase after her. She gets to her dell, and takes her form. Enter the huntsmen, Aiken has spied her sitting with her spindle, threads, and images. They are eager to seize her presently, but Aiken persuades them to let her begin her charms, which they do. Her son and daughter come to her; the huntsmen are affrighted as they see her work go forward. And overhasty to apprehend her, she escapes them all, by the help and delusions of Puck.

== Continuations ==
Jonson wrote only the first three acts, but the story was finished by another writer, F. G. Waldron, in 1783, and a second continuation was written by Alan Porter in 1935.

== Analysis ==
The play contains an adaptation from a fragment of Sappho: "The dear good angel of the spring, / The nightingale."

== Sources ==
- Birch, Dinah, ed. (2009). "Sad Shepherd, The". The Oxford Companion to English Literature (7th ed.). Oxford University Press. ISBN 978-0-19-280687-1.
- Higham, T. F.; Bowra, C. M., eds. (1938). The Oxford Book of Greek Verse in Translation. Oxford: Oxford University Press.

Attribution:

- Gifford, William, ed. (1879). The Works of Ben Jonson, with a Memoir. London: George Routledge and Sons. pp. 490–1.
