= The Staple of News =

Play

The Staple of News is an early Caroline era play, a satire by Ben Jonson. The play was first performed in late 1625 by the King's Men at the Blackfriars Theatre, and first published in 1631.

== Publication ==
The Staple of News was entered into the Stationers' Register in Feb. 1626, but was not published till five years later. Like The Devil is an Ass, The Staple of News was intended to be part of the second folio collection of Jonson's works that was being readied for publication in 1630, as a follow-up to the first collection in 1616. The project was abandoned, apparently because Jonson grew dissatisfied with the quality of the printing (done by John Beale). The Staple of News, again like Devil is an Ass, was published separately in 1631 in folio format from the existing typesetting, by the bookseller Robert Allot – though it is unclear whether this was ever a commercial publication, or whether Jonson privately distributed copies of the play among friends, acquaintances, and admirers. The play next appeared in print in 1640, in the Volume 2 of the second folio of Jonson's works.

== Content ==
Among the late comedies that some critics have dismissed as Jonson's "dotages," The Staple of News has often been regarded as "the most admirable of Jonson's later works." It has attracted scholarly attention for its satire on the newspaper and news agency business that was a recent and rapidly evolving innovation in Jonson's era. The first semi-regular news serials in English (then called "corantos"), printed in the Netherlands, had appeared in 1620 in response to the start of the Thirty Years' War; over the next year London publication of English translations of foreign-news pamphlets increased; and in 1622 Nathaniel Butter formed syndicate for supplying and printing news serials in English. In Jonson's play, the News Staple is a parody of these developments. Jonson may have had a political motive for his satire: the new business in news concentrated on war news from Europe, which fed the popular urge for England's involvement on the Protestant side of the conflict. Jonson is thought to have sympathised with King James's strong reluctance to become involved in a European war.

The play, however, is more than a simple and direct satire on the incipient newspaper business, a sort of 1620s anticipation of The Front Page. The News-Staple material comprises only a few scenes in the play as a whole. The main plot, about the Pennyboy family and Lady Pecunia, is a satire on the emerging ethic of capitalism; and the play features a complex threefold satire on abuses of language, in the News Staple, the society of jeerers, and the project for a Canting College. The play also provides an expression of the females-out-of-control theme that is so central and recurrent in Jonson's plays, from the Ladies Collegiate in Epicene (1609) to the three bad servants in The Magnetic Lady (1632).

== Sources ==
As is usual for Jonson, The Staple of News is well-grounded in precedents from Classical literature. As The Case is Altered drew plot materials from two plays by Plautus, so The Staple of News borrows from no less than five plays by Aristophanes. The main plot, about Lady Pecunia and her suitors, derives from Plutus, while the language cabals draw upon The Clouds, Assemblywomen, and Thesmophoriazusae. And when the mad Pennyboy Senior puts his dogs on trial, the debt is to The Wasps. Scholars have also noted borrowings from the dialogue Timon by Lucian, as well as links with earlier English plays, including The Contention Between Liberality and Prodigality (printed 1601) and The London Prodigal (1605).

Jonson also re-used some material from his unproduced 1624 masque Neptune's Triumph for the Return of Albion in the play. The anti-masque in that work contained a dialogue between a poet and a cook, which is one instance in the pattern of Jonsonian ridicule of his partner in creating masques, Inigo Jones. Jonson ridiculed Jones in works spanning two decades, from Bartholomew Fair (1614) to Love's Welcome at Bolsover (1634). This recycling of material from the poet-and-cook dialogue in Neptune's Triumph makes The Staple of News another instance in this pattern of mockery of Jones.

== Synopsis ==
The play begins with the entrance of the actor who speaks the Prologue – quickly followed by four audience members seeking seating on the stage. (The practice of selling seats on the periphery of the stages in the private theatres of the era is exploited for commentary and comedy in a variety of plays, from Beaumont's The Knight of the Burning Pestle (1607) to Jonson's Magnetic Lady.) In this case the four are the Gossips Mirth, Tattle, Expectation, and Censure. They interrupt the Prologue with their comments, and continue this through the four entr'actes that Jonson calls "Intermeans" – a structure he would employ again in The Magnetic Lady. The gossips have a number of criticisms of the play as it proceeds (mainly that it contains neither a devil nor a fool).

The play proper begins by introducing the situation of the Pennyboy family. Pennyboy Junior, a spendthrift, and Pennyboy Senior, an usurer and miser, are competing for the hand of the plutocratic Lady Pecunia. The nomenclature is somewhat misleading: Pennyboy Senior and Junior are not father and son, but uncle and nephew. The missing member of this family triangle, their brother and father, is present through the play, though he is disguised as a street singer; Pennyboy Cantor, as he is known, has faked his death (like Flowerdale Senior in The London Prodigal) to observe the conduct of his family.

Accompanied by Pennyboy Cantor, Pennyboy Junior, a man about town, pays a visit to the new curiosity, the News Staple. Cymbal, the manager (a caricature of Nathaniel Butter, pioneer of English newspapers), gives them a tour of the facility and explains its operation. They also encounter Picklock, a "Man o' Law," who plays a sinister role in the action to come.

Lady Aurelia Clara Pecunia is largely a symbol for the new society of capitalism that was developing at the time. She is served by her nurse, named Mortgage, her ladies in waiting, Statute and Band, and her chambermaid, Wax. Among her many wooers are the members of the society of jeerers. The members of this heterogeneous company – a sea captain, a poet, a doctor, and a courtier – have all gone bankrupt and now devote themselves to insulting and jeering at others, raising their practice to a pretended art form. Their leader is Cymbal, the manager of the News Staple. Pennyboy Senior attempts to enter Pecunia's good graces by conniving with her servants, Broker the gentleman usher and Lick-finger the cook. As a miser, however, he becomes a prime target for the jeerers. The uncle and nephew also conduct an acerbic rivalry over their prospects with Pecunia.

Act III begins, oddly enough, with a preface to the readers, asking them to approach the material that follows in a judicious frame of mind. Pennyboy Junior, still accompanied by his disguised father, escorts Pecunia and her attendants to the News Staple, where he spends foolishly on spurious news of the day. ("The art of drawing farts out of dead bodies,/ Is by the Brotherhood of the Rosy Cross / Brought to perfection...," etc.) Meanwhile, Cymbal takes an opportunity to press his own suit to Pecunia; and he jeers his rival suitor Pennyboy Senior mercilessly.

Pennyboy Junior and Pecunia and her attendants adjourn to a nearby tavern – but they are tracked down by the jeerers. In an increasingly drunken state, they drive out Pennyboy Senior, and Junior proposes a plan for a Canting College. The Canting College will teach all the insider vocabularies that special interests use to maintain and advance their own self-interest and victimise the public. Pennyboy Cantor, disgusted by all that he has seen and heard, quarrels with the jeerers and finally doffs his disguise, revealing his true identity. He denounces his son and withdraws Pecunia to his own house.

The Pennyboys have to confront another hurdle, in the attempted cheat of the villain Picklock; but Pennyboy Junior's frustration of Picklock's scheme demonstrates his repentance and returns him to his father's good graces. Pennyboy Senior has by now been driven mad by the mockery of the jeerers; he puts his dogs on trial for scheming to cheat him. Yet a final victory over the jeerers, and his discovery that his brother Pennyboy Cantor is still alive, help to restore Pennyboy Senior's wits. Pecunia accepts Pennyboy Junior as her future husband, and amity and concord are restored.
