= Bartholomew Fair (play) =

Play by Ben Johnson

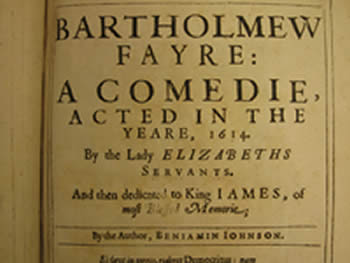
Title page of Bartholomew Fair: A Comedy.

Bartholomew Fair is a Jacobean comedy in five acts by Ben Jonson. It was first staged on 31 October 1614 at the Hope Theatre by the Lady Elizabeth's Men company. Written four years after The Alchemist, five after Epicœne, or the Silent Woman, and nine after Volpone, it is in some respects the most experimental of these plays.

The play was first printed in 1631, as part of a planned second volume of the first 1616 folio collection of Jonson's works, to be published by the bookseller Robert Allot; however, Jonson abandoned the plan when he became dissatisfied with the quality of the typesetting. Copies of the 1631 typecast were circulated, though whether they were sold publicly or distributed privately by Jonson is unclear. The play was published in the second folio of Jonson's works in 1640–41, published by Richard Meighen.

== Background ==
The play is set at Bartholomew Fair, which from 1133 to 1855 was one of London's preeminent summer fairs. It opened on 24 August each year at Smithfield, in the northwestern part of the city. Smithfield, a site of slaughterhouses and public executions, was a fitting place for a fair that was part commerce and part spectacle. At once a trading event for cloth and other goods and a pleasure fair, the four-day event drew crowds from all classes of English society.

Jonson's play uses this fair as the setting for an unusually detailed and diverse panorama of early seventeenth-century London life. The one day of fair life represented in the play allows Jonson ample opportunity to not just conduct his plot, but also to depict the vivid life of the fair, from pickpockets and bullies to justices and slumming gallants. Jonson also uses the characters that he creates as a way to comment on the social, religious and political conflicts of London society in Jacobean England.

== Synopsis ==
The play begins with an extended bit of metadrama; the company's stage-keeper enters, criticising the play about to be performed because it lacks romantic and fabulous elements. He is then pushed from the stage by the book-keeper, who (serving as prologue) announces a contract between author and audience. The contract appears to itemise Jonson's discontentment with his audiences: Members are not to find political satire where none is intended; they are not to take as oaths such innocuous phrases as "God quit you"; they are not to "censure by contagion", but must exercise their own judgment; moreover, they are allowed to judge only in proportion to the price of their ticket. Perhaps most important, they agree not to expect a throwback to the sword-and-buckler age of Smithfield, for Jonson has given them a picture of the present and unromantic state of the fair.

The play proper begins with a proctor and amateur dramatist Littlewit and his friends, Quarlous and Winwife; they are plotting how to win Dame Purecraft (a widow, and Littlewit's mother-in-law) from Zeal-of-the-Land Busy, a canting, hypocritical Puritan.

This colloquy is interrupted by the entrance of Wasp, the irascible servant of Cokes, a country simpleton who is in town to marry Grace Wellborn. Grace is the ward of Adam Overdo, a Justice of the Peace; Overdo's wife is Cokes's sister. All of these characters are at Littlewit's to get a marriage license; having obtained it, they indulge Cokes's wish to visit the fair.

Littlewit and his friends also plan to go to the fair to see a puppet-show Littlewit wrote. To overcome Busy's likely objections, they pretend that Win (Littlewit's wife) has a pregnant craving for roast pork. The Renaissance audience, familiar with stage satire of Puritans, would not have been surprised that Busy, far from abhorring the fair and its debauchery, is ready to rationalise his presence there as allowable and even godly. The first act ends with both groups, the genteel Overdos and the raffish Littlewits, headed for the fair.

The fair propels these characters through experiences that put their social identities under extreme strain. Justice Overdo, well-read in the "disguised prince" tradition, assumes a disguise to ferret out wrongdoing at the fair; he is beaten by Wasp, falsely accused by Edgeworth, a cut-purse, and put in the stocks. Quarlous and Winwife engage Edgeworth to steal the marriage license from Wasp; he does so when Wasp is arrested after starting a fight. Wasp, too, is put in the stocks. Winwife has abandoned his plan to marry Dame Purecraft; instead, he and Quarlous fight for Grace's hand. Win Littlewit and Mistress Overdo are enlisted as prostitutes by the pimp Whit; Zeal-of-the-land Busy is arrested for preaching without license and put into the stocks. Cokes is robbed several times by Edgeworth and other denizens of the fair. All the imprisoned characters escape when Trouble-All, a seeming madman for whom Dame Purecraft has conceived a sudden passion, fights with the guards.

The climax of the play occurs at the puppet show. Madame Overdo and Win are brought in, masked, as prostitutes; Madame Overdo is drunk. Overdo is still in disguise, and Quarlous has disguised himself as Trouble-All; in this guise, he stole the marriage license from Winwife and made it into a license for himself and Purecraft. The puppet show, a burlesque of Hero and Leander and Damon and Pythias, proceeds until Busy interrupts, claiming that the play is an abomination because the actors are cross-dressed. The puppets refute him decisively by raising their clothes, revealing that they have no sex. Busy announces himself converted into a "beholder" of plays.

At this point, Justice Overdo reveals himself, intent on uncovering the "enormities" he has witnessed at the fair. He is in the process of punishing all of the various schemers and malefactors when his wife (still veiled) vomits and begins to call for him. Abashed, Overdo takes the advice of Quarlous and forgives all parties; Winwife marries Grace, Quarlous marries Purecraft, and all the characters are invited to Overdo's house for supper.

== Puritans ==
Zeal-of-the-land Busy is Jonson's second foray, after The Alchemist's Tribulation and Ananais, into a field of satire common in Jacobean drama: satire against Puritans. Various factors combined to make the godly or "precisians" obvious targets of ridicule. Though religious violence was comparatively uncommon in Jacobean England, the memory of such violence was fresh enough to make marginal believers or outsiders potential sources of anxiety or threat. This element of threat was especially notable in the second decade of James's reign, when the tenuous Calvinist consensus in the English Church began to disintegrate. In this context, stage attacks on the godly may have served to channel and release broader anxieties about social trends.

Playwrights also had a more immediate reason for this animosity; Puritans had opposed the public theatre almost from its inception. Hostility to drama was not, of course, limited to separatists or Puritans; preachers of all shades of belief denounced the plays as profane and the theatres as sites of theft, drunkenness, and licentiousness. Correctly or not, playwrights treated Puritans as the main source of these attacks. On stage, the Puritan is a hypocritical, judgmental, and long-winded figure, masking his lusts behind a vocal obsession with trivialities; Busy, for example, announces his intention to eat pork at the fair merely to refute the charges of "Judaism" he claims are levelled at Puritans, and he ends up consuming two whole pigs.

== Performance history ==
The induction allows for a more specific date of performance than is usual for Renaissance plays; the première took place on 31 October 1614 at the Hope Theatre in Bankside. Entries in the Revels accounts indicate that the performance was repeated at Whitehall for James I the next day. The royal account also lists ten pounds paid to Nathan Field for acting in the play; in the fifth act, Jonson causes Cokes to ask the puppetmaster, "Which is your best actor now...your Burbage...your Field?"

There is no further record of performance until 1661, although it was likely to have remained in repertory to some degree until its anti-Puritan sentiments made it unwise to revive it. William Oldys reports a traditional view that the inscription on Jonson's tomb ("O rare Ben Jonson") refers to the applause this play received, after the failure of Catiline, indicating some degree of popularity. Samuel Pepys records seeing it four times in 1661, twice with the puppet show and twice without (8 June, 27 June, 31 August and 7 September 1661). The play appears to have been revived intermittently through the earlier part of the eighteenth century; after that, in keeping with the waning taste for non-Shakespearean Renaissance drama in general and for Jonson in particular, the play fell into obscurity. It retained a degree of esteem in the study even as it disappeared from the boards; both Isaac Reed and Horace Walpole praised its wealth of invention in their accounts of Renaissance drama. John Brown revised the play and offered it to David Garrick; Garrick refused it, however, and Brown's text is lost.

As with many long-ignored plays, Bartholomew Fair returned to the stage in a production by the Phoenix Society—this one, in 1921 at the New Oxford Theatre. Its first professional revival came in 1949, when George Devine directed it at the Edinburgh International Festival; the next year, the same production appeared at The Old Vic. The puppets in this production were performed by George Speaight. The Bristol Old Vic produced the play in 1966. Terry Hands directed the play for the Royal Shakespeare Company in 1969; this production included Ben Kingsley as Winwife and Helen Mirren as Win Littlewit. The production, which cut the long text and freely mixed period and modern properties, received generally negative reviews. The play was also performed (some time in the 1960s) at the University of California, Berkeley, with Stacy Keach playing Overdo.

Richard Eyre produced the play for the National Theatre; his first production as head of the theatre, it was performed on the Olivier Stage in mid-Victorian costume. David Bamber, David Burke, and Stephen Moore were among the cast. Of this production, Eyre himself writes, "What felt as though it might have been a true popular success … shows itself to be dismal and unachieved.

In 1998, Laurence Boswell directed the play for the RSC at the Swan Theatre. Featuring Zubin Varla and Poppy Miller, the production attempted to update Jonson's cheerfully downscale milieu with "Newcastle United shirts, garish yellow tweed and plenty of atmospheric sleaze" according to The Times; this review was mildly favourable, as were the others. The production was later revived at the Young Vic.

The Stratford Shakespeare Festival mounted the New World's first professional production of the play in 2009, directed by Antoni Cimolino with original music composed by Steven Page. The cast featured Tom McCamus, Lucy Peacock, and Juan Chioran.

The play was performed in 2019 at the Sam Wanamaker Playhouse (part of Shakespeare's Globe) in London.
