= The Case is Altered =

Play written by Ben Jonson

The Case is Altered is an early comedy by Ben Jonson. First published in 1609, the play presents a range of problems for scholars attempting to understand its place in Jonson's canon of works.

== Date and publication ==
The play's title was first used by the jurist Edmund Plowden, who died in 1585. Scholars generally date the play to c. 1597. Yet it did not appear in print until a decade later. The Case is Altered was entered into the Stationers' Register on 26 January 1609, with the publishing rights assigned to the booksellers Henry Walley and Richard Bonion; a second entry in the Register, dated 20 July the same year, adds Bartholomew Sutton's name to Walley's and Bonion's. The quarto that appeared in 1609 was printed in three states with three different title pages.

Q1a: under the title Ben Jonson, His Case is Altered, published by Bartholomew Sutton.

Q1b: as A Pleasant Comedy, called: The Case is Altered, and "Written by Ben. Jonson." Published by Sutton and William Barrenger.

Q1c: under the same title as Q1b, and from the same publishers, but with Jonson's name as author removed.

== Performance ==
All three title pages state that the play was acted by the Children of the Blackfriars. This company of boy actors had originated as the Children of the Chapel, and went through a series of name changes during its tempestuous career; the version of the name used in a given case can help to date a performance or production. In this case, it is thought that The Case is Altered was printed in 1609 because it had recently been revived by the boys' troupe playing at the Blackfriars Theatre. It is not known what company may have performed the original version of the play before 1599 (The Children of the Chapel were not active in dramatic performance in 1597–98).

== Authorship ==
The text of the 1609 edition is somewhat irregular. The play's first three acts adhere to the scheme of formal act–scene division that Jonson favoured in his works – but Acts IV and V do not, suggesting a second author or a revision by another hand. Revision could also explain a few anomalies in the text, like an allusion to Jonson's Every Man in His Humour, which was written later than The Case is Altered. Anthony Munday is certainly connected with the play in at least one sense: Act I satirises him as "Antonio Balladino" – though he has also been put forward as a possible part-author of the play, as has Henry Porter.

Critics have noted that the play was never included in any of the three folio collections of Jonson's works in the 17th century, and was apparently never mentioned by him; and also that its romantic plot and its loose structure (with a blending of multiple plots and subplots) are atypical of the general nature of Jonson's drama. One commentator calls the play a "false start" and a "loose end" in Jonson's canon.

The play, however, is strongly dependent upon Classical examples in a way suggestive of Jonson: The Case is Altered borrows plots from two of the plays of Plautus, the Captivi ("The Captives") and the Aulularia ("The Pot of Gold"). The former supplies the plot of the Milanese Count Ferneze and his persecuted slave – who turns out to be his long-lost son; and the latter the tale of the miser Jaques and his supposed daughter Rachel. The result is an Elizabethan/Plautine confection at least somewhat comparable to Shakespeare's The Comedy of Errors.

While The Case is Altered is not a major element in Jonson's dramatic achievement, critics have regarded it as significant in that it probably represents Jonson's first attempt at a comedy of humours, a type of play he would develop further in Every Man in His Humour (1598) and Every Man out of His Humour (1599).
