= Gilbert Cleuch =

Scottish stone mason

Gilbert Cleuch (died 1569) was a Scottish stone mason based in Edinburgh.

== Career ==
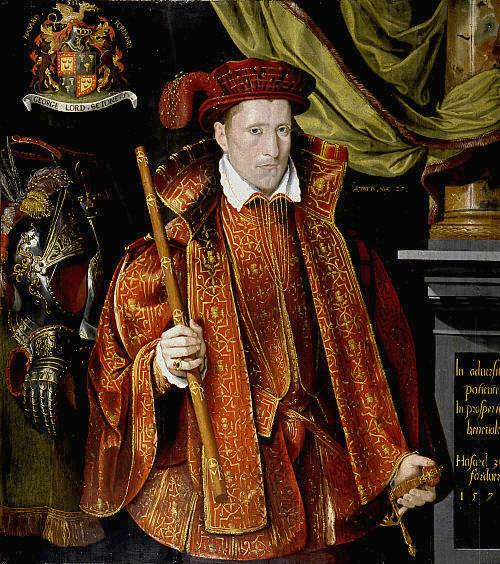
Gilbert Cleuch worked for Lord Seton

His name occurs several times in the accounts of the burgh of Edinburgh. In September 1552 he worked for a week laying a floor in St Giles for new stalls in the quire, which were made by the carpenters Robert Fender and Andrew Mansioun. A notarial record made by Gilbert Grote mentions people drinking in his Canongate house in 1562. Canongate was then a separate burgh to Edinburgh.

Cleuch died in his Canongate house in November 1569. A fellow mason John Inglis was an executor and contributed to the costs of his funeral. His will records money owed to him for his "mason craft" by George Seton, 7th Lord Seton, indicating that he had worked at Seton Palace. His spouse was Margaret Stevenson, and their youngest daughter was called Agnes.

In 1581 the Master of the King's Wine Cellar, Jerome Bowie acquired a property on the south side of Edinburgh's Canongate which had belonged to Gilbert Cleuch. Cleuch had given adjacent houses to his two older daughters, Margaret, who had married a maltman Peter Wood, and Helen, who married William Gray. Jerome Bowie obtained possession of a part of Helen Cleuch and William Gray's property in 1581. Bowie's son James Bowie had both properties in 1617, and his daughter Anna Bowie was the owner in 1642. Eventually these properties were bought up by Charles Maitland of Hatton and incorporated in Queensberry House, now part of the Scottish Parliament buildings.
