= Museum of Edinburgh =

Museum in City of Edinburgh, Scotland

Coordinates: 55.9514°N 3.1796°W

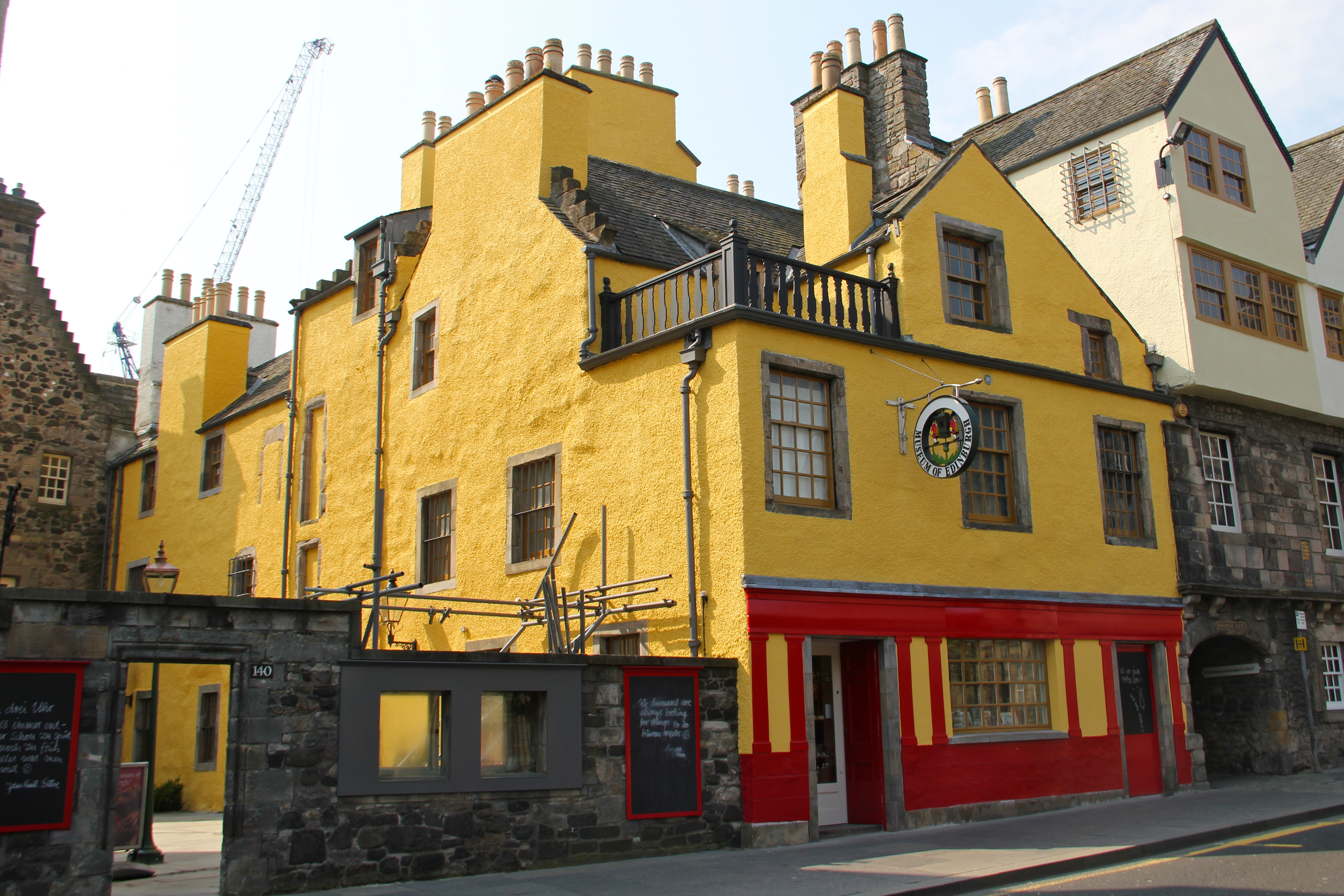
- Former name: Huntly House
- Location: 142-146 Canongate, Edinburgh EH8 8DD, United Kingdom
- Website: https://www.edinburghmuseums.org.uk/venue/museum-edinburgh

The Museum of Edinburgh, formerly known as Huntly House Museum, located at 142-146 Canongate, is a museum in Edinburgh, Scotland, housing a collection relating to the town's origins, history and legends. Exhibits are described as a maze of history with more rooms than one can imagine. From decade to decade down the timeline, rooms include an original copy of the National Covenant signed at Greyfriars Kirk in 1638 and a reconstruction of Field Marshal Earl Haig's headquarters on the Western Front during the Great War, the latter exhibiting items bequeathed to the Museum.

Situated in the late 16th-century Huntly House on the Canongate, the museum is maintained by the City of Edinburgh Council. The museum sits three stories tall with a unique yellow exterior. The museum is within the heart of Edinburgh for all locals and tourist to find.

In 1570, the Museum of Edinburgh was constructed for notable members of Clan Gordon who resided in Huntly Castle. The Earl who resided here was known as George Gordon, 1st Marquess of Huntly. His residency is controversial, being considered erroneous by the Royal Commission on the Ancient and Historical Monuments of Scotland. Subsequently, the Incorporation of Hammermen, a group of metalsmiths, purchased Huntly House in 1647 as their new headquarters and had the building expanded by architect Robert Mylne during their ownership. In 1924, when the building was under threat of destruction, the city purchased it and it became the Museum of Edinburgh. Present day, the locals still refer to it as Huntly House.

The museum was featured in Season 3 of the show Outlander.

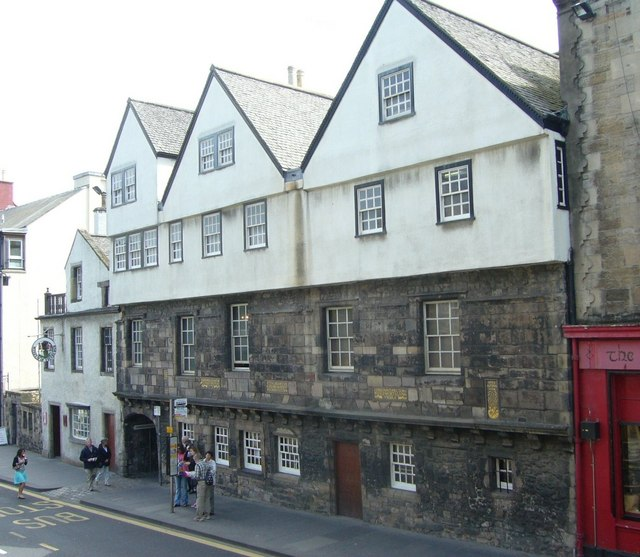

The Museum houses spectacular collections of decorative art which reveal a history of Scottish craftsmanship, from cut and engraved glass and intricately made silver from Edinburgh and Canongate, costume, longcase clocks, along with Scottish pottery and Scottish porcelain dating from the 1760s.

The Museum of Edinburgh's collections total around 220,000 items related to Edinburgh across all of its venues, and has four collections recognized by the Scottish government for National Significance. The building encapsulates the story of the city from beginning to present day. James Craig's original plans for the "New Town" reside within its walls to give every detail.

== See also ==
- Edinburgh Museums, libraries and galleries
