= The Canongate =

District of Edinburgh, Scotland

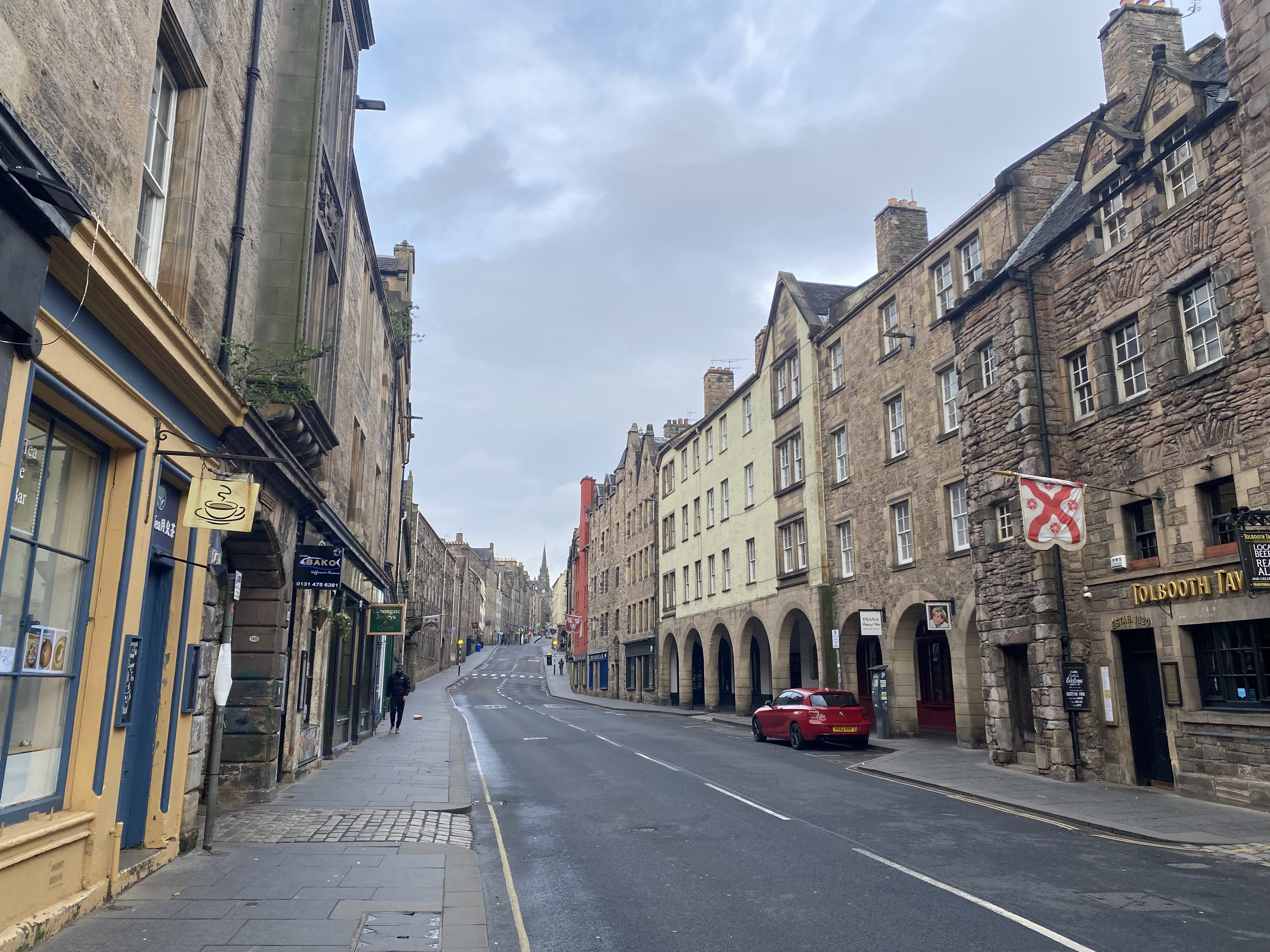
Street of Canongate

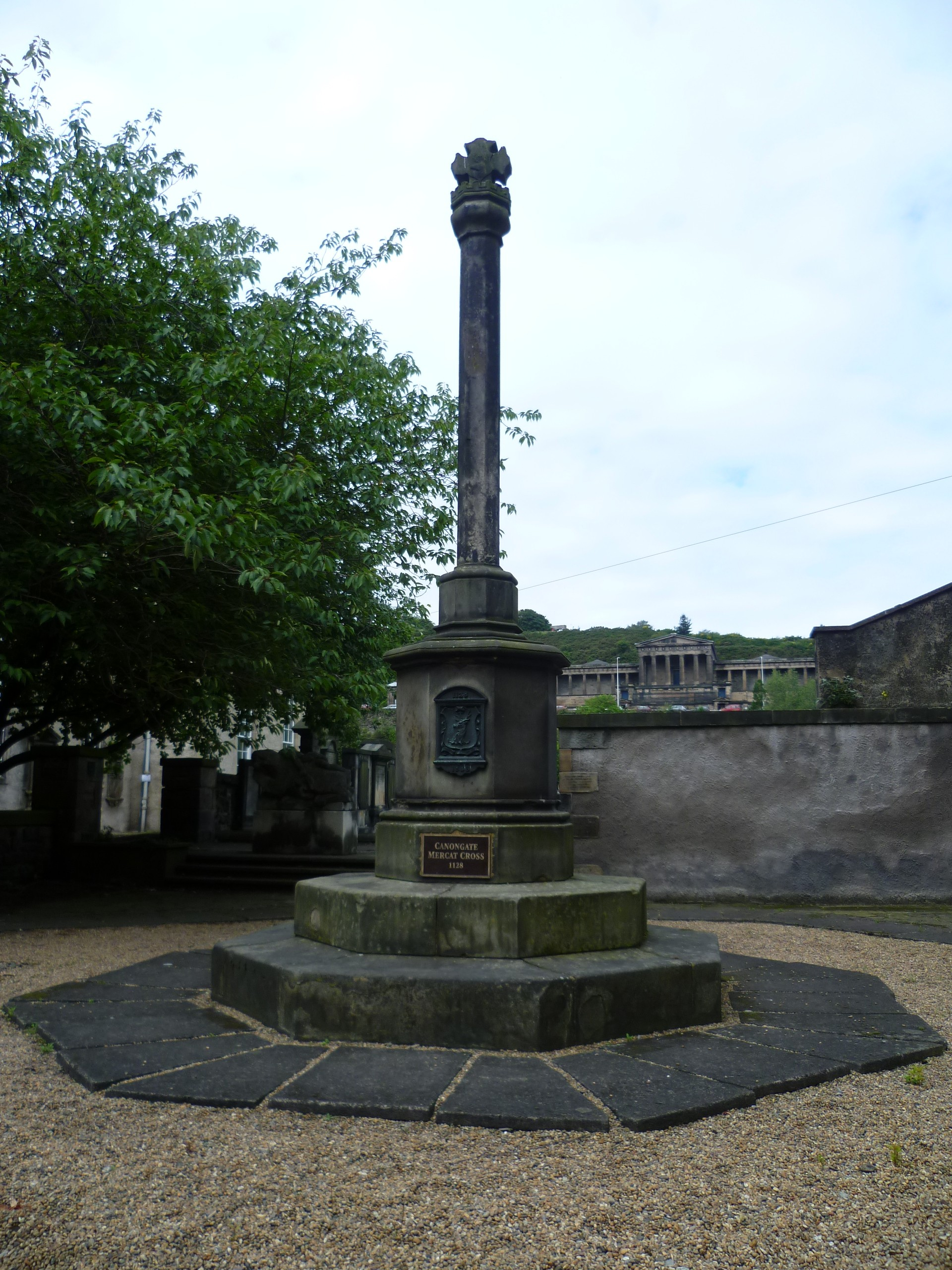
Canongate Burgh Cross in the grounds of the Canongate Kirk

The Canongate is a street and associated district in central Edinburgh, the capital city of Scotland. The street forms the main eastern length of the Royal Mile while the district is the main eastern section of Edinburgh's Old Town.

David I of Scotland, by the Great Charter of Holyrood Abbey c. 1143, authorised the Abbey to found a burgh separate from Edinburgh between the Abbey and the city. The burgh of Canongate which developed was controlled by the Abbey until the Scottish Reformation, when it came under secular control. In 1636 the adjacent city of Edinburgh bought the feudal superiority of the Canongate but it remained a semi-autonomous burgh under its own administration of bailies chosen by Edinburgh magistrates, until its formal incorporation into the city in 1856.

The burgh gained its name from the route that the canons of Holyrood Abbey took to Edinburgh—the canons' way or the canons' gait, from the Scots word gait meaning "way". In more modern times, the eastern end is sometimes referred to as part of the Holyrood area of the city. The burgh of Canongate had a sometimes turbulent relationship with its neighbour, Edinburgh. The main reason for this was the continual battle over their exact boundaries up until their unification in 1856, an event which proved unpopular with the former's townsfolk.

The Canongate contains several historic buildings including Queensberry House, now incorporated in the Scottish Parliament Building complex, Huntly House (now the Museum of Edinburgh), the Canongate Tolbooth (now housing the People's Story Museum) and the Canongate Kirk, opened in 1691 replacing Holyrood Abbey as the parish church of the Canongate. The church is still used for Sunday services as well as weekday concerts.

== Early history ==
The Canongate owes its existence to the establishment of Holyrood Abbey in 1128. King David I, who established the Abbey, gave the surrounding area to the Augustinian canons then resident at Edinburgh Castle in the form of a regality. The King also gave leave to the canons to establish a burgh between the abbey and Edinburgh, and as it was the only burgh within the regality it was given the status of burgh of regality of Canongate. The area originally controlled by the abbey included the lands of Broughton, areas around the Pleasance and North Leith, the latter giving the canons access to a primitive harbour.

In 1380, the Canongate, lying outwith the town walls of Edinburgh, was largely destroyed by fire at the hands of the English army under Richard II.

== Medieval and post-medieval ==
Holyrood Palace was developed from the 14th century onwards as successive monarchs made increasing use of the Abbey for political events such as parliaments and royal councils. The word "Pallais" appears in a reference to the royal lodgings in the reign of James IV, but they were first converted to palace buildings by James V in 1525.

Archaeological excavations in 1999 and 2000 found part of the medieval boundary ditch. It is thought to run underneath and follow the route of Holyrood road. There appears to have been one created in the 12th century that was then filled in and a new one created in the 13th/14th century with palisade added to it. The archaeologists also found evidence of the 'city walls' that were built in 1513. Those walls were meant be boundaries but not defensive. Those attacking Edinburgh generally stormed through the Water-Yett (Water Gate) and took possession of the Canongate. They then would attempt to assault Edinburgh through the Netherbow Port.

=== Rough Wooing ===
In May 1544, during the Rough Wooing, the English army under Lord Hertford attacked and burnt Edinburgh. The English Master of Ordnance, Christopher Morris, brought artillery up the Canongate to assault Edinburgh's Netherbow Gate. During this operation some of the English gunners were killed. The English infantry attacked the gate and, according to the English narrative, pulled one of the Scottish artillery pieces through its gunloop. The Scots could not retaliate due to heavy small arms fire and archery, during which Morris placed a cannon close to the gate. After three or four rounds, the gate was breached and the English army stormed through killing 300 or 400 defenders. The Scottish heavy guns were withdrawn from the High Street into the Castle. According to a report sent to Charles V, Holy Roman Emperor, the English troops were unused to urban warfare and fought amongst each other on the High Street, and William Howard, a brother of the Duke of Norfolk, was hurt in the cheek by an English arrow.

=== Marian civil war ===
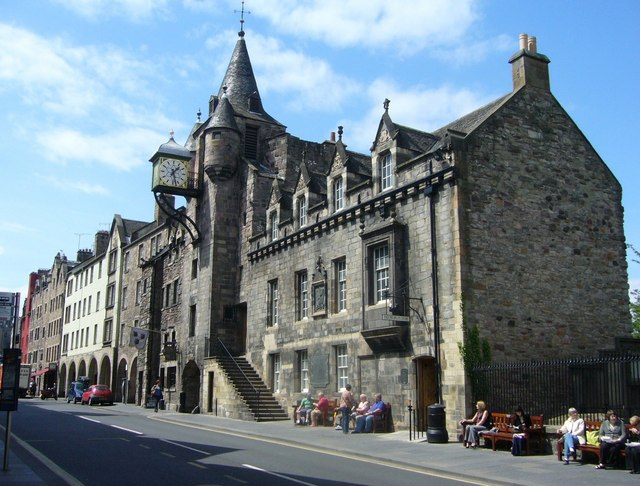
The Canongate Tolbooth, erected in 1591

In the 1560s, several French servants of Mary, Queen of Scots and archers of the royal guard including Captain Belloc, formed relationships with women in the Canongate. The church authority, the Kirk Session, disapproved of them as fornicators, as they mostly had no plans for marriage. Some of the women were made to stand at the burgh cross with bared heads for three hours.

After Mary was forced to abdicate, there was civil war in Scotland. Her supporters in Scotland took control of Edinburgh Castle, and the king's party resided in the Canongate and at Leith. Regent Lennox lodged in the Canongate house of Cuthbert Ferguson in 1571. The house was protected from cannon shot with bags of wool and animal skins.

=== Tennis courts and lodging houses ===
There were several tennis courts in Edinburgh and the Canongate. One was close to the Palace, at the lodging of Henry Kinloch, and another was built nearby in 1623 by Alexander Peiris. Kinloch and Peiris also kept lodging houses, Kinloch hosted the French ambassador Rambouillet in February 1566. Rambouillet was entertained at the Palace by Mary, Queen of Scots in "maskrie and mumschance" during which her ladies were dressed in men's clothes. Kinloch subsequently hosted a banquet to celebrate the wedding of the Earl of Bothwell and Jean Gordon. Anne Halkett, the religious writer, stayed with Peiris at the foot of the Canongate in 1650. She was told that it was a "civil house, and the best quality lay there that had not houses of their own".

=== Merchants and craftsmen ===
Goldsmiths including John Acheson, Elias Le Tellier, James Gray who sold pearls to Mary, Queen of Scots, and pistol-makers like John Kello had shops on the street, and in the 1590s there was a Flemish clockmaker, Abraham Wanweyneburgh. The mason Gilbert Cleuch had a house in the Canongate. When James VI returned to Edinburgh in 1579 after spending his childhood at Stirling Castle, some courtiers including the master of his wine cellar, Jerome Bowie, acquired houses in the Canongate.

== 17th and 18th centuries ==
The accession of King James VI to the throne of England in 1603 began the long and slow decline of the Canongate. The loss of the royal court from the Holyrood Palace inevitably affected the wealth of the surrounding area. Some aristocrats continued to live and build substantial houses and gardens on the street, including Mary Sutton, Countess of Home, whose townhouse, Old Moray House still survives in part.

Canongate remained a centre for the manufacture and retail of luxury goods and domestic furnishings. Carnation striped worsted wool wall hangings for Newbiggin House were woven in the Canongate by James Crommie in 1665. James Leblanc made mirrors, and argued with Sarah Dalrymple, who had a business painting furniture and mirrors in the Japan style, over a possible monopoly on glass for mirrors and lighting sconces.

The union of the parliaments in 1707 also affected the area, as up until then Edinburgh had been the location of the Parliament of Scotland with the Canongate providing a fashionable suburb for the dwellings of the political class. The North Bridge, finally opened in 1772, provided a new and more convenient route from Edinburgh to the port of Leith effectively bypassing the Canongate which had until then been the main route from Edinburgh to Leith via Easter Road causing even more neglect to the residential area which was gradually taken over by industrial premises including breweries and a large gasworks. Archaeological excavations have shown that it was at this time many of the back gardens were turned into industrial sites.

The Canongate was an important district during the Scottish Enlightenment partly because of the presence of the Canongate Theatre (1746-1786), of which one of the proprietors was Lord Monboddo. The philosopher David Hume performed in a play staged there.

== 19th century ==
Writing in 1824, Robert Chambers said of the Canongate, "As the main avenue from the palace into the city, it has borne upon its pavements the burden of all that was beautiful, all that was gallant, all that has become historically interesting in Scotland for the last six or seven hundred years".

Sir Walter Scott writing in 1827 stated; "Sic itur ad Astra; This is the path to heaven. Such is the ancient motto attached to the armorial bearings of the Canongate, and which is inscribed, with greater or less propriety, upon all the public buildings, from the church to the pillory, in the ancient quarter of Edinburgh which bears, or rather once bore, the same relation to the Good Town that Westminster does to London".

== 20th and 21st centuries ==
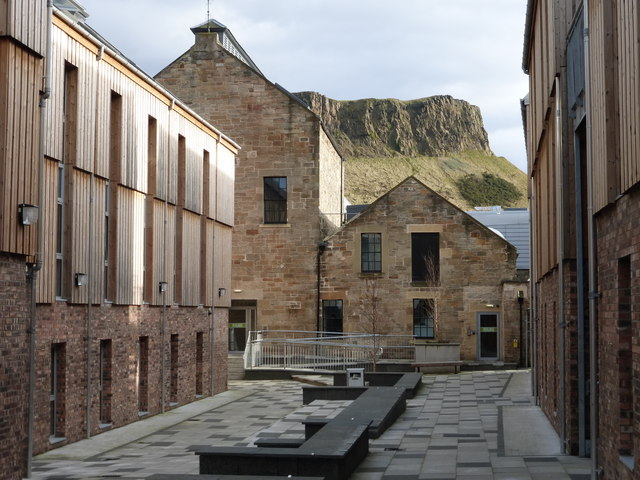
Sugarhouse Close is an example of a modern development in the Canongate. Note the renovated brewery buildings.

The area has seen various attempts at improvements and slum clearance, including various schemes by Ebenezer James MacRae in the 1930s and Sir Robert Hurd in the 1950s in traditional style replicating original facades. The Canongate Flats scheme, completed in 1969, by the Basil Spence practice was in modern style but in proportion to surrounding buildings.

Due to the redevelopments of the 1950s/60s the overcrowded and impoverished area suffered from serious depopulation. From the 1960s onwards the Canongate area became notably less industrial, with all of the breweries closing. Residential redevelopment began on former industrial sites in the 1990s and 2000s with flats, offices and other commercial operations being built south of the main road, reversing the decline in population. Whilst much of this development has a modern appearance, some attempt has been made in terms of layout to retain the "fishbone" pattern characteristic of the Royal Mile.

As of 2006, the redevelopment of former industrial land to the north of the Canongate, once occupied by Victorian gasworks and a later bus garage, has proved controversial, partly due to the original proposal, now abandoned, to demolish some of the replacement buildings from the 1930s.

Above all, the construction of the new Scottish Parliament Building on the site of the old Younger's Abbey Brewery has led to a resurgence of the area's vitality with the Canongate becoming the centre of Scottish political life.

== Education ==
The Royal Mile Primary School - a typical late-Victorian board school

The Royal Mile Primary School, formerly known as Milton House Public School, is a non-denominational state school that provides primary education for 5- to 11-year-old children. It was designed in 1886 by Robert Wilson, architect for the Edinburgh Board of Education.

Within the school, there is also a nursery which caters for 3- to 5-year-old children. As the school is so central to the Canongate community, its pupils are often involved in illustrious events at the Scottish parliament and Edinburgh Castle. It is used as a polling station for the constituents of Edinburgh Central.

The Canongate is also the location of Moray House, the Education department of the University of Edinburgh (formerly Moray House College of Education). It comprises a number of buildings centred on St. John Street, some of which are historic, whilst others are purpose built. A number of other university buildings including the Pleasance student union building and the Centre for Sport and Exercise are located in the area historically covered by the Canongate.

== Historic crosses ==
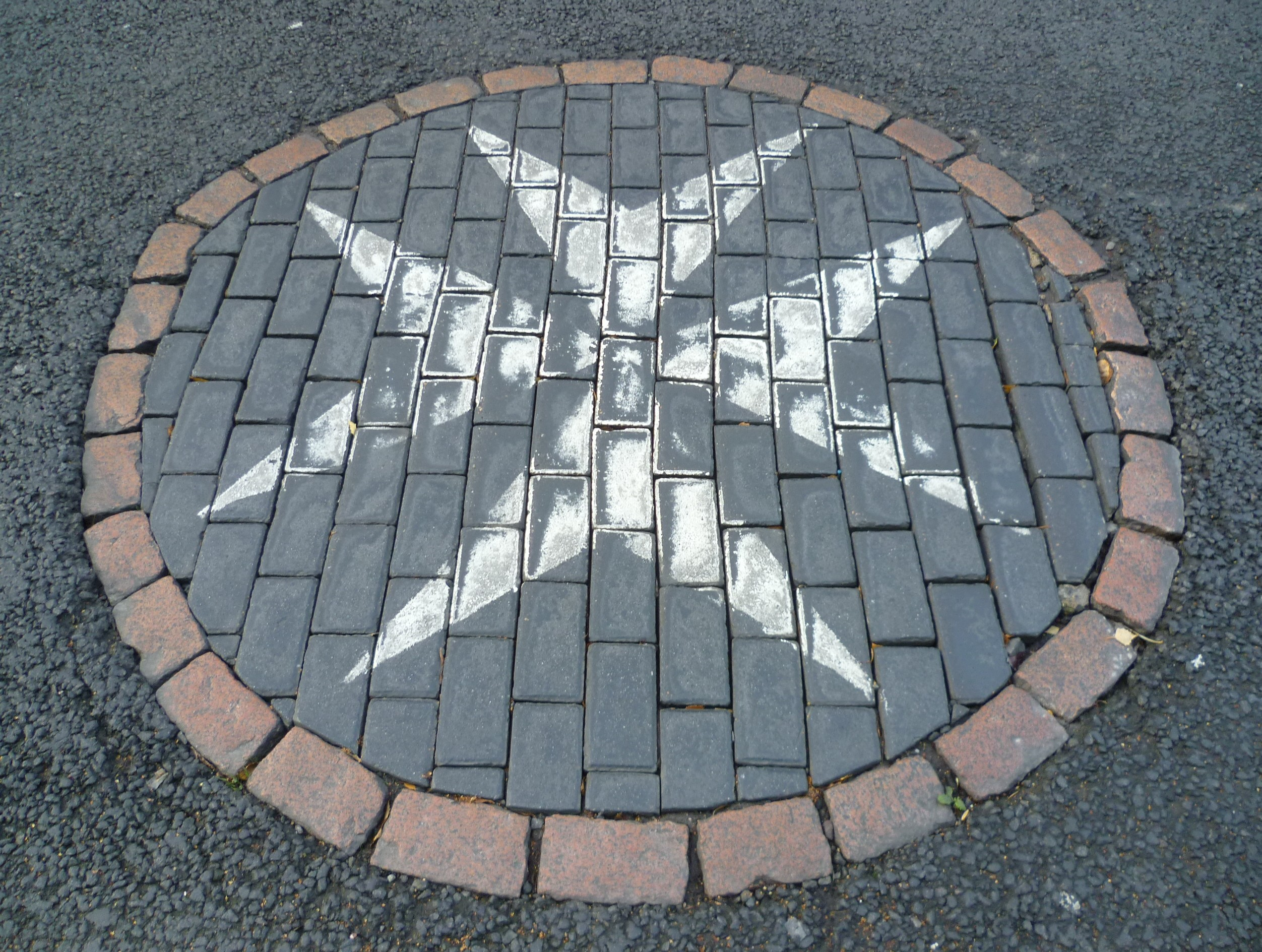
Site of St. John's Cross

There were three crosses on the Canongate section of the Royal Mile.

The ancient Mercat Cross (Market Cross) or Burgh Cross is shown on Gordon of Rothiemay's 1647 plan as being in the middle of the road nearly opposite the tolbooth. Gordon shows it as being similar to the Edinburgh Mercat Cross with the shaft and cross mounted on a stone gallery. The much-altered cross now stands in the south-east corner of Canongate Churchyard to the right hand side of the entrance to Canongate Kirk.

The St John's Cross used to stand further up the Canongate to the west. The site is now marked by a maltese cross formed by coloured setts in the road surface near the top of St John's Street (55.950975°N 3.181766°W). It was known as St. John's Cross because it stood on property thought to belong to the Knights of St. John in the Middle Ages, and it marked the ancient boundary of that part of the Royalty of Edinburgh which lay outwith the Netherbow Port and the city wall.

Where the Girth Cross, which has also been called the "Abbey" or "South" Cross at various times, once stood is now marked by a radiating circle of setts. (55.95260°N 3.17492°W). It marked the western limit of the Girth of Holyrood, "the greatest sanctuary in Scotland, and the last to disappear". It is shown on a map of the 1573 siege of Edinburgh, published in Holinshed's Chronicles in 1577, as an ornamental shaft elevated on a flight of steps and was not demolished until after 1767. In its shadow proclamations were read and executions were carried out. A notable execution took place next to the cross in 1600 when the young and beautiful Jean Kincaid (Lady Warriston) was beheaded by the Maiden for conspiring in the murder of her abusive husband.

== Coat of arms ==
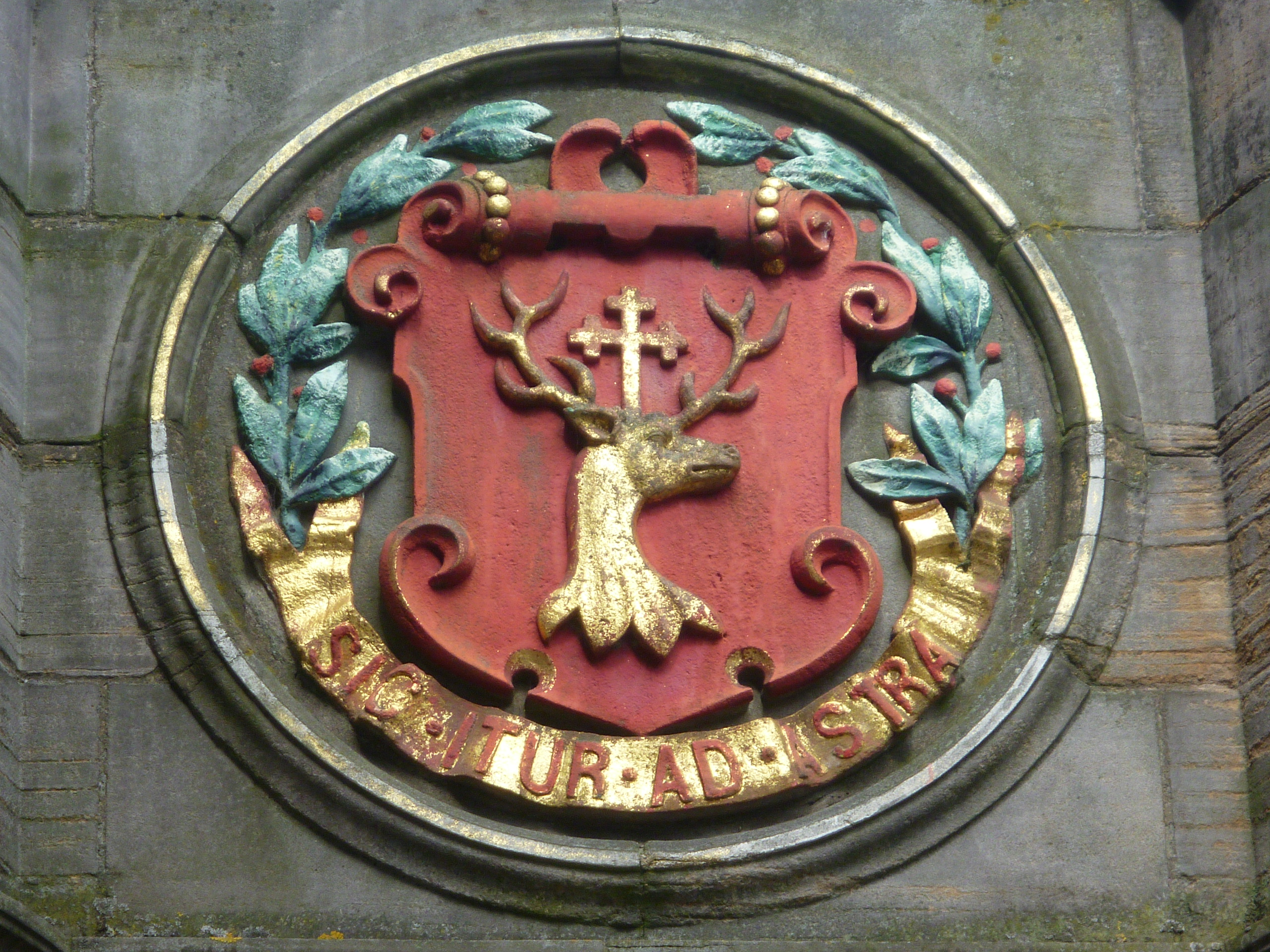
Canongate's arms as depicted on the Edinburgh Mercat Cross

The coat of arms of the Canongate features a white hart's head and a golden cross, recalling the old legend in which King David I was saved from goring from a stag by the sudden appearance of a holy cross. The arms, though technically obsolete since the abolishment of the burgh of Canongate in 1856, can still be seen in many locations in and around the district, including on Edinburgh's mercat cross where they appear alongside the royal arms of Britain, Scotland, England and Ireland, the burgh arms of Edinburgh and Leith, and the arms of the University.

The motto is Sic itur ad astra meaning 'thus you shall go to the stars', a quote from Virgil's Aeneid.

== Important buildings ==
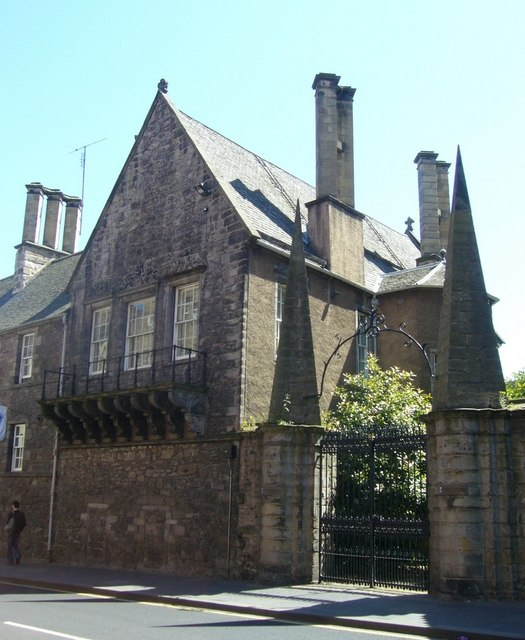
Moray House built by Lady Home around 1625

- Canongate Kirk 1691.
- Moray House, built by Mary, Countess of Home around 1625, extended as Moray House College of Education.
- Queensberry House, 1686, now part of the Scottish Parliament.
- Canongate Tolbooth, 1591, now the People's Story Museum.
- 167–169 Canongate, early 17th century, upper floors part of People's Story Museum, ground floor a public house.
- Lodge Canongate Kilwinning Number 2 1736, the oldest purpose built masonic lodge still used for its original purpose, officially "Lodge no. 2" attended by Robert Burns who was Invited to become their poet laureate.
- Chessel's Court, 1745.
- Morocco Land, a tenement of 1730 bearing the carved upper torso of a Moor.
- Shoemaker's Land, a tenement of 1725.
- Bible Land, a tenement of 1677.
- Huntly House, from 1517, now the Museum of Edinburgh.
- Whitefoord House, 1769, now the home of the Scottish Veterans Association.
- White Horse Close, a picturesque courtyard dating from around 1680 which served the Edinburgh-London coach and mailcoach route in the 18th century, restored in the early 1960s.
- Golfers Land
- Canongate Flats
- Palace of Holyroodhouse, the official residence of the British monarch in Scotland.
- Holyrood Abbey

== Famous residents ==
- Bruce Chatwin (1940–89) lived in Canongate while a student at University of Edinburgh from 1966 to 1968
- Oliver Cromwell stayed at Old Moray House during two periods of residence in Scotland
- John Craig, former Dominican priest, colleague of John Knox in St Giles'
- John Gay stayed at Queensberry House as guest of his patron, 3rd Duke of Queensberry
- Lord Milton
- Mary Dudley, Countess of Home, builder of old Moray House.
- Very Rev Dr Patrick MacFarlan, born in Canongate manse
- John Notman (1810-1865), architect and landscape architect
- Christian Ker Reid, silversmith born here
- Tobias Smollett lodged briefly at his sister's house above St. John's Pend
- Adam Smith lived in Panmure Close
- Lord Monboddo, whose house stood in St. John's Street
- Sir William Wardlaw, 16th baronet lived at Chessels Court
- John Nisbet, Lord Dirleton
- William Bannatyne, Lord Bannatyne lived and died in Whiteford House.

== Literature ==
It appears in chapter 49 of the Pickwick Papers by Dickens.

Walter Scott named Chronicles of the Canongate (1820s) after the area.
