= Scottish Parliament Building =

Home of the Scottish Parliament at Holyrood, Edinburgh

- Scottish Gaelic: Pàrlamaid na h-Alba; Scots: Scots Pairlament Biggin
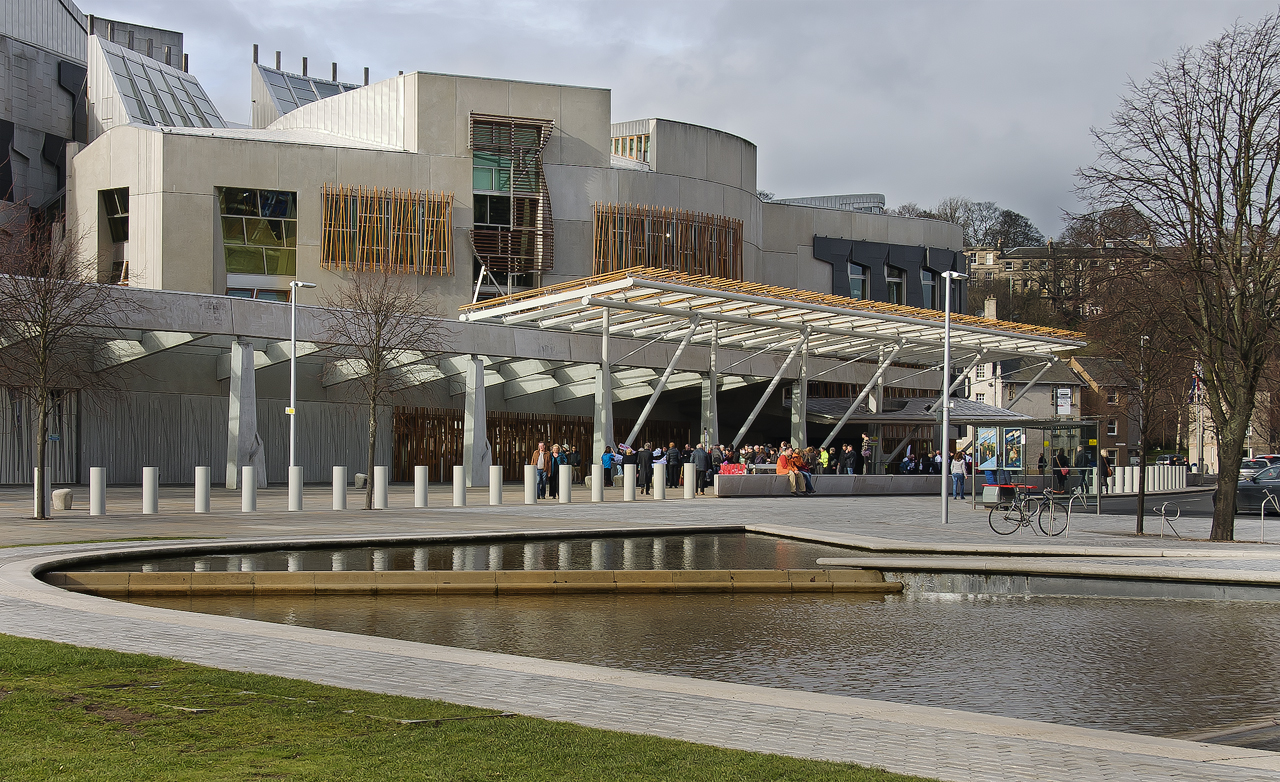
- Frontage and public entrance of the Scottish Parliament Building
- Alternative names: Holyrood

General information
- Type: Seat of the national parliament of Scotland
- Architectural style: Post-modern
- Location: The Scottish Parliament; Edinburgh; EH99 1SP, Scotland
- Coordinates: 55°57′08″N 3°10′29″W
- Current tenants: The Scottish Government and Members of the Scottish Parliament
- Construction started: June 1999
- Inaugurated: 9 October 2004
- Cost: £414 million

Design and construction
- Architects: Enric Miralles, Benedetta Tagliabue
- Architecture firm: EMBT, RMJM (Scotland) Ltd
- Structural engineer: Ove Arup & Partners
- Main contractor: Bovis Lend Lease
- Awards: 2005 Stirling Prize

Website
- www.parliament.scot/index.aspx

The Scottish Parliament Building (Note: Scots: Scots Pairlament Biggin; Scottish Gaelic: Pàrlamaid na h-Alba) is the home of the Scottish Parliament at Holyrood in central Edinburgh. Construction of the building commenced in June 1999 and the Members of the Scottish Parliament (MSPs) held their first debate in the new building on 7 September 2004. The formal opening by Queen Elizabeth II took place on 9 October 2004. Enric Miralles, the controversial Spanish architect who designed the building, died before its completion.

From 1999 until the opening of the new building in 2004, committee rooms and the debating chamber of the Scottish Parliament were housed in the General Assembly Hall of the Church of Scotland located on The Mound in Edinburgh. Office and administrative accommodation in support of the Parliament were provided in buildings leased from the City of Edinburgh Council. The new Scottish Parliament Building brought together these different elements into one purpose-built parliamentary complex, housing 129 MSPs and more than 1,000 staff and civil servants.

From the outset, the building and its construction have been controversial. The choices of location, architect, design and construction company were all criticised by politicians, the media and the Scottish public. Scheduled to open in 2001, it did so in 2004, more than three years late with an estimated final cost of £414 million, many times higher than initial estimates of between £10m and £40m. A major public inquiry into the handling of the construction, chaired by the former Lord Advocate, Lord Fraser of Carmyllie, was established in 2003. The inquiry concluded in September 2004, and criticised the management of the whole project from the realisation of cost increases, down to the way in which major design changes were implemented. The original lintel from Parliament House which housed the Parliament of Scotland until 1707 was installed above the debating chamber in the new parliament building.

Despite these criticisms and a mixed public reaction, the building was welcomed by architectural academics and critics. The building aimed to achieve a poetic union between the Scottish landscape, its people, its culture and the city of Edinburgh. The Parliament Building won numerous awards including the 2005 Stirling Prize and has been described by landscape architect Charles Jencks as "a tour de force of arts and crafts and quality without parallel in the last 100 years of British architecture".

== History ==
=== Pre–1707 ===
From c. 1235 to 1707, the Parliament of Scotland served as the national legislature of the Kingdom of Scotland, except for a period during the Wars of the Three Kingdoms. For most of its existence, Scotland's Parliament did not have a regular meeting place; between 1438 and 1561, it usually met at the Old Tolbooth, Edinburgh and from 1538 onwards in St Giles' Cathedral. By the 1630's, the Cathedral was becoming inadequate due to the increasing number of Scottish MPs, resulting in the construction of the Parliament House, Edinburgh, which served as Parliament's meeting place until the Acts of Union 1707. The act unified the kingdoms of Scotland and England into the Kingdom of Great Britain, dissolving the Scottish and English parliaments and established the Parliament of Great Britain, which was based in London like its English predecessor. As per the terms of the treaty, Scotland sent 16 Scottish representative peers to the House of Lords and 45 MPs to the House of Commons.

=== Scottish devolution ===
On 11 September 1997, amidst an increase in Scottish nationalism, a devolution referendum was held in Scotland which approved the establishment of a directly elected Scottish Parliament to legislate on most domestic affairs. Following this, the Scottish Office, led by the then Secretary of State for Scotland, Donald Dewar, decided that a new purpose-built facility would be constructed in Edinburgh, to house the Scottish Parliament. Dewar was appointed as the inaugural first minister of the country, serving in the position until his death in October 2000, and subsequently began being referred to as the "Father of the Nation" for his work in achieving Scottish devolution.

=== Design ===
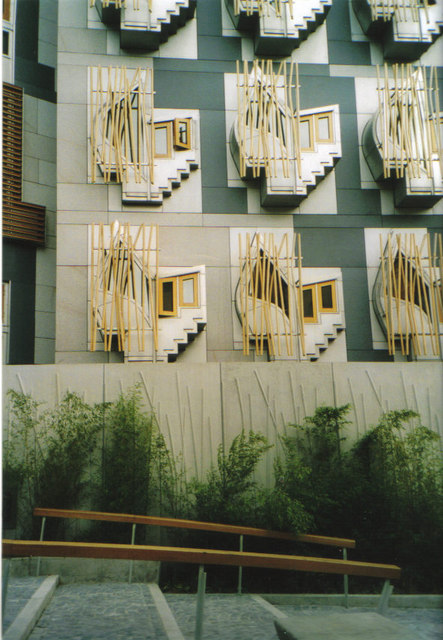
Design detailing on the MSP "pods" located in each of the MSPs offices

Following on from the site selection, the Scottish Office announced that an international competition would be held to find a designer for a new building to house the Parliament. A design committee was appointed under the chairmanship of Dewar, and was tasked with choosing from a shortlist of designs. Proposals were submitted from internationally renowned architects such as Rafael Viñoly, Michael Wilford and Richard Meier. Twelve designs were selected in March 1998, which were whittled down to five by the following May. The five final designs were put on public display throughout Scotland in June 1998. Feedback from the public displays showed that the designs of the Spanish architect Enric Miralles were amongst the most popular. The design team took account of public opinion on the designs and invited all five shortlisted entrants to make presentations on their proposed designs before announcing a winner.

On 6 July 1998, it was declared that the design of Enric Miralles was chosen, with work being awarded to EMBT/RMJM (Scotland) Ltd, a Spanish-Scottish joint venture design company created for the project. Construction, which was undertaken by Bovis Lend Lease, commenced in June 1999, with the demolition of the Scottish and Newcastle brewery and the beginning of foundation work to support the structure of the building. Miralles sought to design a parliament building that could represent and present a national identity. This intractably difficult question was tackled by displacing the question of identity onto the landscape of Scotland. In a characteristically poetic approach, he talked about slotting the building into the land "in the form of a gathering situation: an amphitheatre, coming out from Arthur's Seat", where the building would reflect a dialogue between the landscape and the act of people sitting. An early goal of the design was to open the building and its public spaces, not just to Edinburgh but to a more general concept of the Scottish landscape. Miralles intended to use the parliament to help build the end of Canongate—"not just another building on the street...it should reinforce the existing qualities of the site and its surroundings. In a subtle game of cross views and political implications."

The result was a non-hierarchical, organic collection of low-lying buildings intended to allow views of, and blend in with, the surrounding rugged scenery, and symbolise the connection between nature and the Scottish people. As a consequence, the building has many features connected to nature and land, such as the leaf shaped motifs of the roof in the Garden Lobby of the building, and the large windows of the debating chamber, committee rooms and the Tower Buildings, which face the broad expanse of Holyrood Park, Arthur's Seat and Salisbury Crags. Inside the buildings, the connection to the land is reinforced by the use of Scottish rock, such as gneiss and granite in the flooring and walls, and the use of oak and sycamore in the construction of the furniture.

=== Construction ===
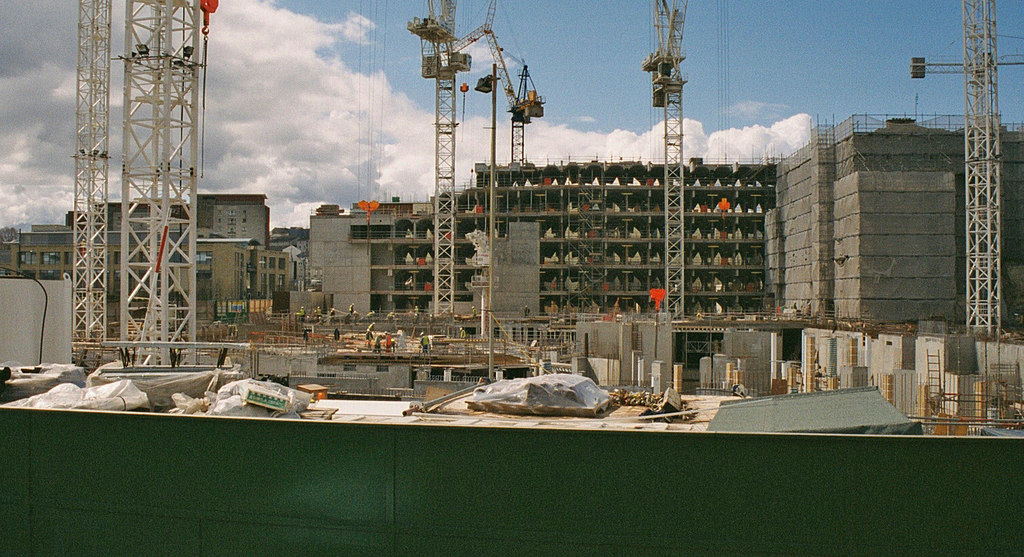
Construction progress by April 2001

Initially, three sites in and around Edinburgh were considered as possible locations for the building, including St Andrew's House (St Andrews House being the home of the Scottish Office—later the Scottish Government); New Parliament House (better known as the imposing former Old Royal High School, Calton Hill); Victoria Quay at Leith docks (adjacent to the major Scottish Office building there) and Haymarket on the vacant railway goods yard, in the west end of the city. The Holyrood site was not entered into the picture until after the official closure date of the competition between the three sites. The date for announcing the winner overran and on the date of the expected announcement instead it was announced that they were going to "rethink their decision" (implying that indeed a decision had been made) and add the Holyrood Brewery site into the running (which had only just closed). However negotiations with the brewing company Scottish and Newcastle, who owned the land, resulted in the company indicating that they would be able to vacate the site in early 1999. As a consequence, the Secretary of State for Scotland agreed that the Holyrood site merited inclusion on the shortlist of proposed locations. The Scottish Office commissioned feasibility studies of the specified areas in late 1997 and in January 1998, the Holyrood site was selected from the shortlist.

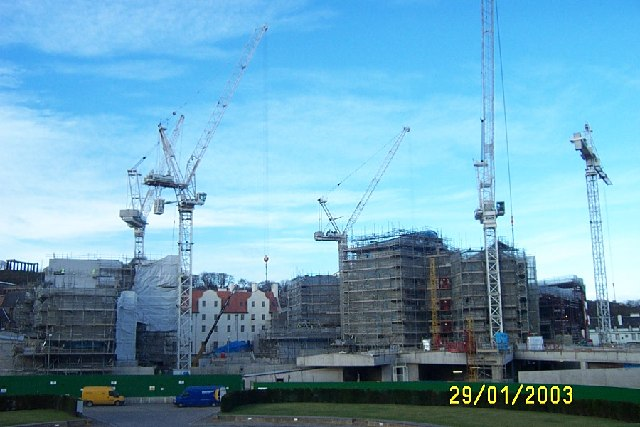
Scottish Parliament Building under construction in January 2003

As part of the construction process, archaeologists conducted excavations of the site. These investigations found several phases of use of the site before it became the parliamentary complex including some evidence of prehistoric use of the area but not significant amounts, and evidence that a boundary ditch for Canongate was the first major structure in the area and then later plots were created by Holyrood Abbey to gather rents. In these plots various activities took place such as gardening and leather tanning. As royal patronage of Holyrood Abbey continued to rise the area saw more high-status properties with gardens appear in the area. Further evidence suggested activity during the post-medieval period (1580–1707). With the construction of Holyrood Palace, the area became very prestigious and many of the properties were brought up to form larger townhouses, one of which became Queensberry House. The archaeologists found evidence that Charles Maitland, Lord Hatton may have converted the kitchen of Queensberry House into a workshop to illegally skim money from the Royal mint, Lord Hatton was a Master of the Scottish Mint. During the early modern period (1707–1825), with the opening of the New Town, there was an exodus of the wealthy from the area and it went into decline. From 1825 until construction started on the new parliament building, the eastern half of the site became a brewery and Queensberry House was converted to a barracks and later to a House of Refuge.

MSPs began to move into the building complex in the summer of 2004, with the official opening by the Queen taking place in October of the same year.

== Parliamentary complex ==
=== Location ===
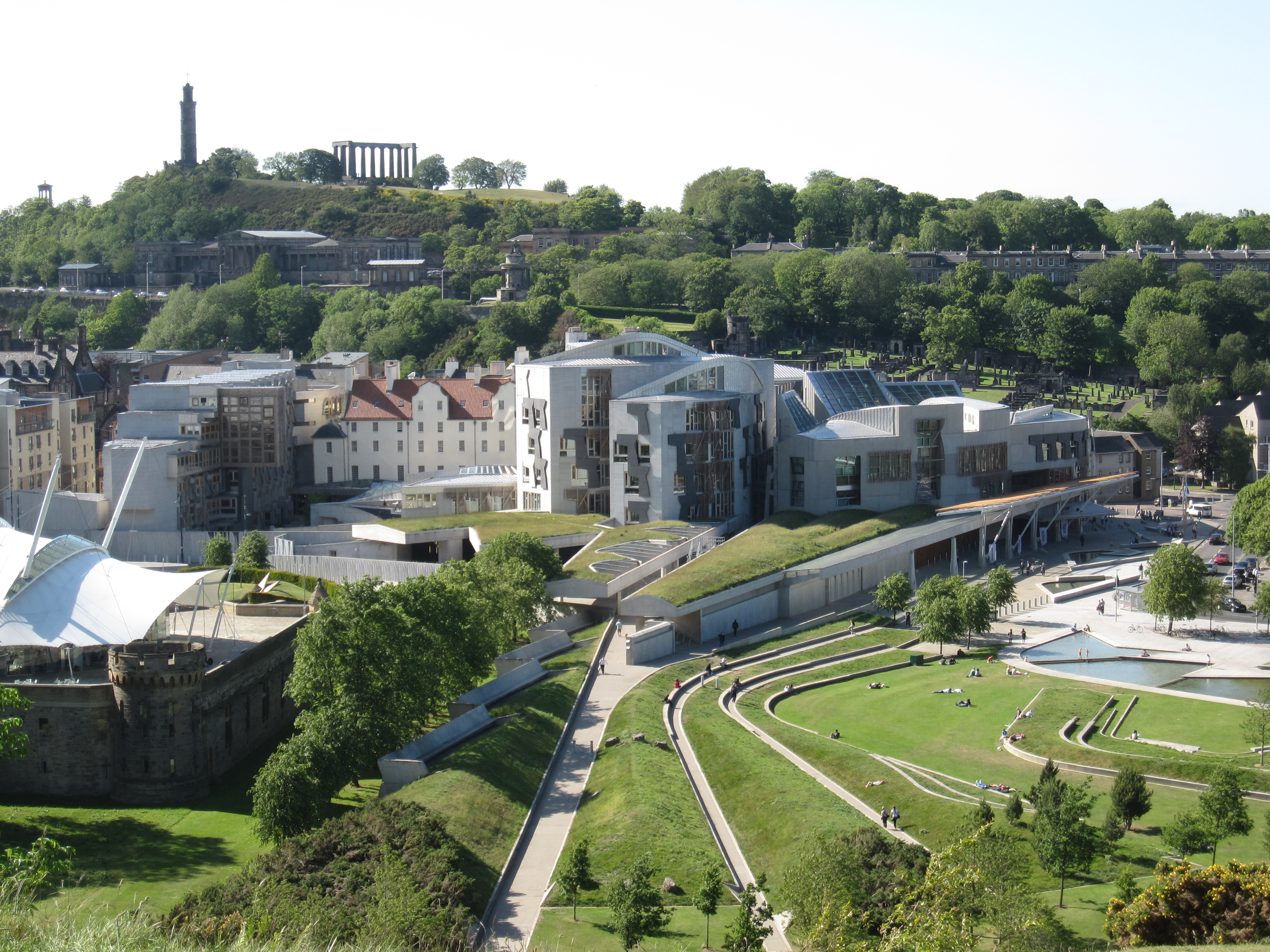
The Scottish Parliament Building with Calton Hill in the background

Comprising an area of 1.6 ha (4 acres), with a perimeter of 480 m (1570 ft), the Scottish Parliament Building is located 1 km (0.6 mi) east of Edinburgh city centre on the edge of the Old Town. The large site previously housed the headquarters of the Scottish and Newcastle brewery which were demolished to make way for the building. The boundary of the site is marked by the Canongate stretch of the Royal Mile on its northern side, Horse Wynd on its eastern side, where the public entrance to the building is, and Reid's Close on its western side. Reid's Close connects the Canongate and Holyrood Road on the southwestern side of the complex. The south eastern side of the complex is bounded by the Our Dynamic Earth visitor attraction which opened in July 1999, and Queen's Drive which fringes the slopes of Salisbury Crags.

In the immediate vicinity of the building is the Palace of Holyroodhouse, which is bordered by the broad expanse of Holyrood Park. To the south of the parliamentary complex are the steep slopes of Salisbury Crags and Arthur's Seat. The Holyrood and Dumbiedykes areas, to the west of the site, have been extensively redeveloped since 1998, with new retail, hotel and office developments, including Barclay House, the new offices of The Scotsman Publications Ltd.

=== Parliament grounds ===
1 Public Entrance 2 Plaza 3 Pond 4 Press Tower 5 Debating Chamber 6 Tower one 7 Tower two 8 Tower three 9 Tower four 10 Tower five, Cannongate Bldg. 11 Main Staircase 12 MSPs' Entrance 13 Lobby 14 Garden 15 Queensberry House 16 MSP building 17 Turf roof 18 Carpark and vehicular entrance 19 Landscaped park

We don't want to forget that the Scottish Parliament will be in Edinburgh, but will belong to Scotland, to the Scottish land. The Parliament should be able to reflect the land it represents. The building should arise from the sloping base of Arthur's Seat and arrive into the city almost surging out of the rock.

— Enric Miralles, 1999

The Parliament is actually a campus of several buildings, reflecting different architectural styles, with a total floor area of 31,000 square metres (312,000 sq ft), providing accommodation for MSPs, their researchers and parliamentary staff. The buildings have a variety of features, with the most distinctive external characterisation being the roof of the Tower Buildings, said to be reminiscent of upturned boats on the shoreline. The inspiration had come from Edwin Lutyens' sheds, made from upturned herring busses (boats), which Miralles saw on a visit to Lindisfarne in Northumberland. It is said that in the first design meeting, Miralles, armed with some twigs and leaves, thrust them onto a table and declared "This is the Scottish Parliament", reinforcing the unique and abstract nature of the parliamentary campus.

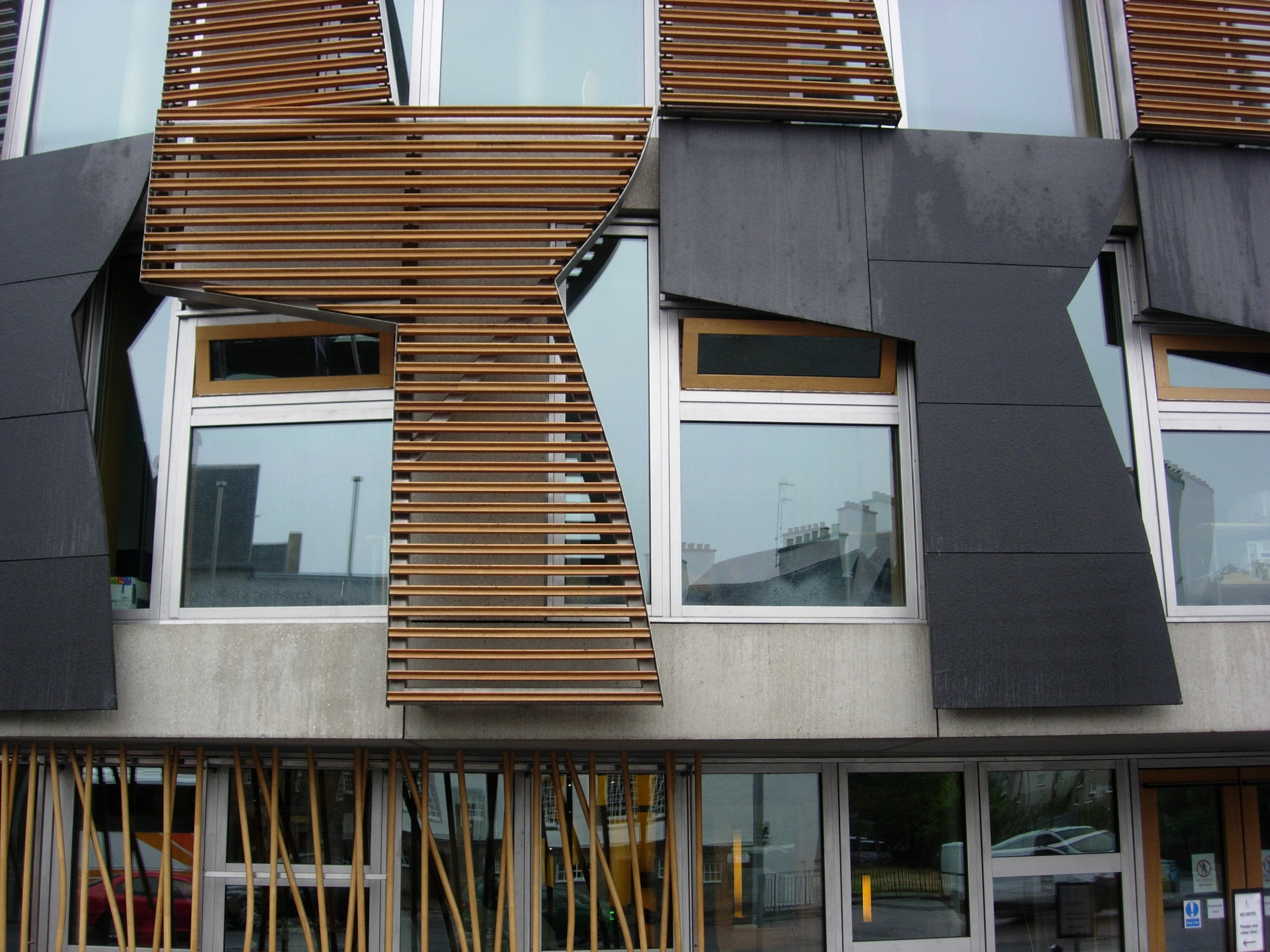
"Trigger panels" as either an abstract of The Skating Minister or curtains drawn back from the windows

The north-western boundaries of the site, the MSPs' building, Queensberry House and the Canongate Building reinforce the existing medieval street patterns "expressing intimacy with the city and its citizens". The south-eastern aspect of the complex is extensively landscaped. Concrete "branches", covered in turf and wild grass extend from the parliamentary buildings, and provide members of the public with somewhere to sit and relax. Indigenous Scottish wildflowers and plants cover much of the area, blending the Parliament's grounds with the nearby Holyrood Park and Salisbury Crags. Oak, Rowan, Lime and Cherry trees have also been planted in the grounds. Adjacent to the landscaped area of the complex, where it meets Horse Wynd, there is an open plan piazza, with bike racks, seating and external lighting shaped like rocks incorporated into concrete paving. Three distinctive water features provide the centrepiece for this area.

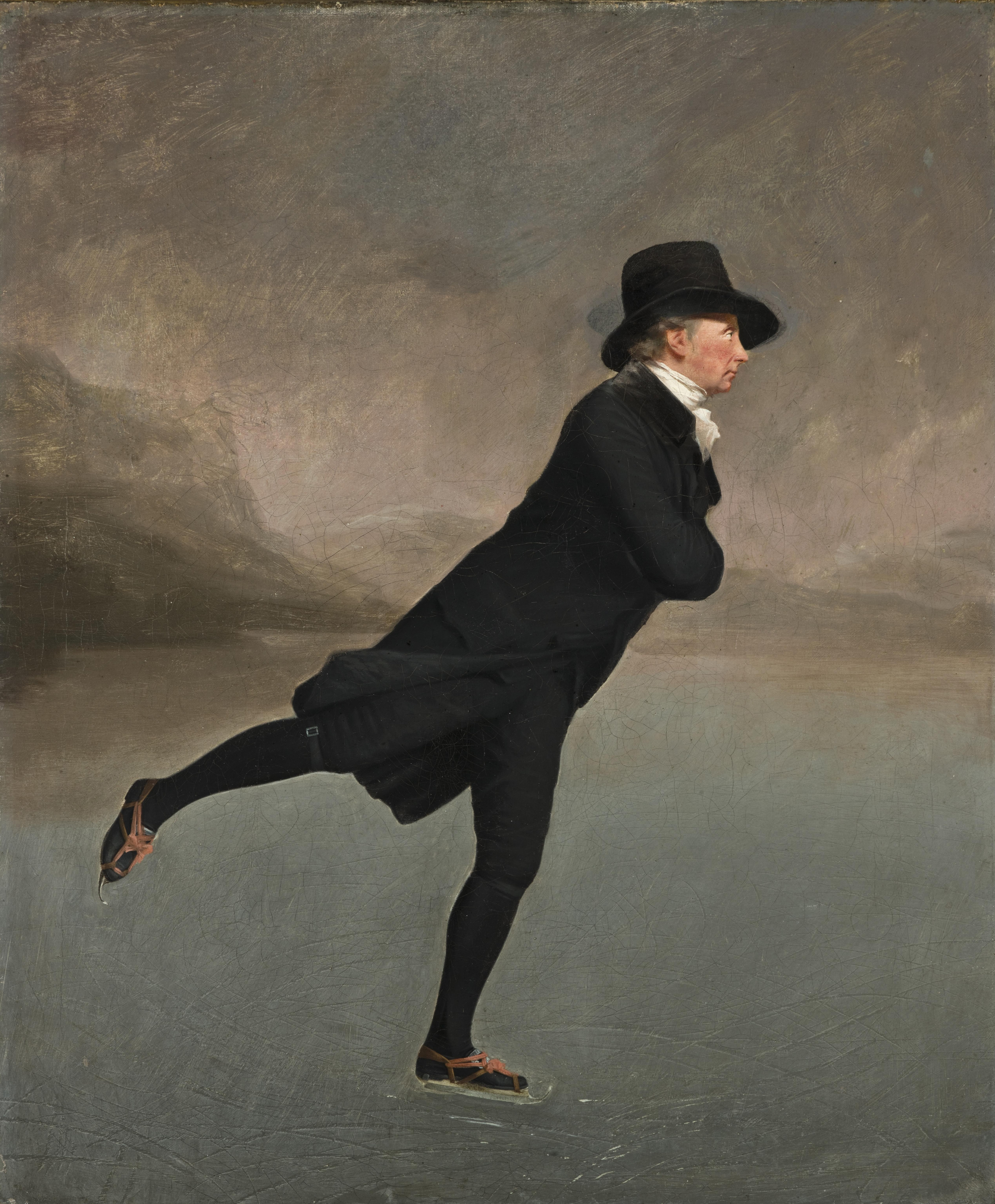
Henry Raeburn's painting of The Skating Minister

References to Scottish culture are also reflected in the building and particularly on some of the building's elevations. There are a series of "trigger panels", constructed out of timber or granite. Not to everyone's taste, these have been said to represent anvils, hairdryers, guns, question marks or even the hammer and sickle. Shortly after the official opening of the building, Enric Miralles' widow, Benedetta Tagliabue, revealed that the design is simply that of a window curtain pulled back. Her late husband however, enjoying the use of ambiguous forms with multiple meanings, had previously said he would love the profile to evoke an icon of Scottish culture, the painting of The Reverend Robert Walker Skating on Duddingston Loch. The architectural critic Charles Jencks finds this a particularly apt metaphor for balanced movement and democratic debate and also notes the irony that Miralles too was skating on ice with his designs for the building. Elsewhere, in the public area beneath the debating chamber, the curved concrete vaults carry various stylised Saltires. Here the architect intends another metaphor; by setting the debating chamber directly above the public area, he seeks to remind MSPs whilst sitting in the chamber that their power derives from the people below them.

The Scottish Parliament Building is open to visitors all year round. On non-sitting days, normally Mondays, Fridays and weekends as well as during parliamentary recess periods, visitors are able to view the Main Hall of the building and can access the public galleries of the debating chamber and main committee rooms. Guided tours are also available on non-sitting days and these allow visitors access to the floor of the chamber, the Garden Lobby, Queensberry House and committee rooms in the company of a parliamentary guide. On sitting days, members of the public must obtain tickets for the public galleries of both the chamber and committee rooms.

=== Sustainability ===
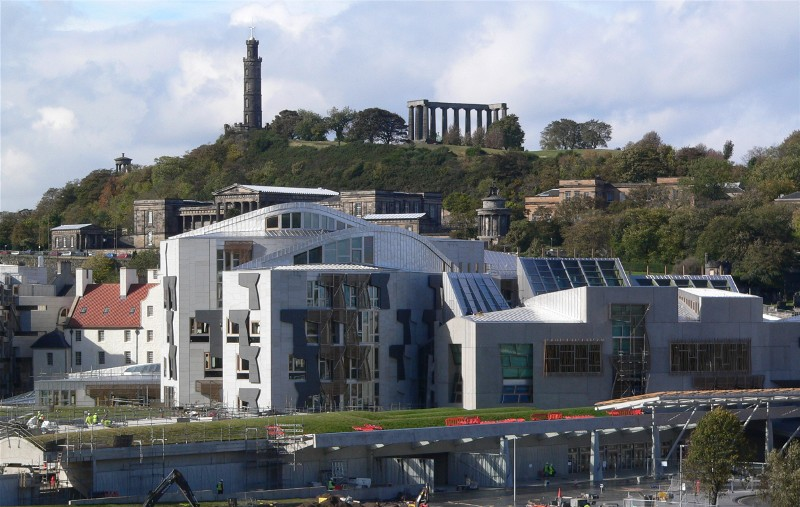
Roof line of the Parliament intended to evoke the crags of the Scottish landscape and, in places, upturned fishing boats. Solar panels can also be seen, part of the building's sustainability strategy.

The Scottish Parliament Building was designed with a number of sustainability features in mind. The decision to build the Parliament on a brownfield site, and its proximity to hubs of public transport are seen as sustainable, environmentally friendly features. All of the electricity purchased for the building comes from renewable sources and solar panels on the Canongate Building are used for heating water in the complex.

A high level of insulation was used to keep the building warm during the winter months. This approach, however, brings with it the potential problem of overheating during the summer due to solar heat gains through the glazing, body heat and the use of computers and electric lighting. Standard solutions to the problem usually involve using energy intensive HVAC systems. The Scottish Parliament Building, however, reduces the requirements for such systems to only 20% of the accommodation by a variety of strategies. Natural ventilation is used wherever possible. A computerised management system senses the temperature in different parts of the Parliament and automatically opens windows to keep the building cool. During summer months, the building opens the windows during the night time when it is unoccupied and permits the heavy concrete floors and structure to cool and rid themselves of heat absorbed during the day. This then helps to keep the building temperature down during the day by absorbing the excess heat from the glazing, occupants and electrical equipment. Some of the concrete floors are further cooled by water from 25 metres (80 ft) deep bore holes beneath the parliamentary campus which also provide water for the toilet facilities. The building achieves the highest rating in the Building Research Establishment's Environmental Assessment Method (BREEAM).

=== Debating chamber ===
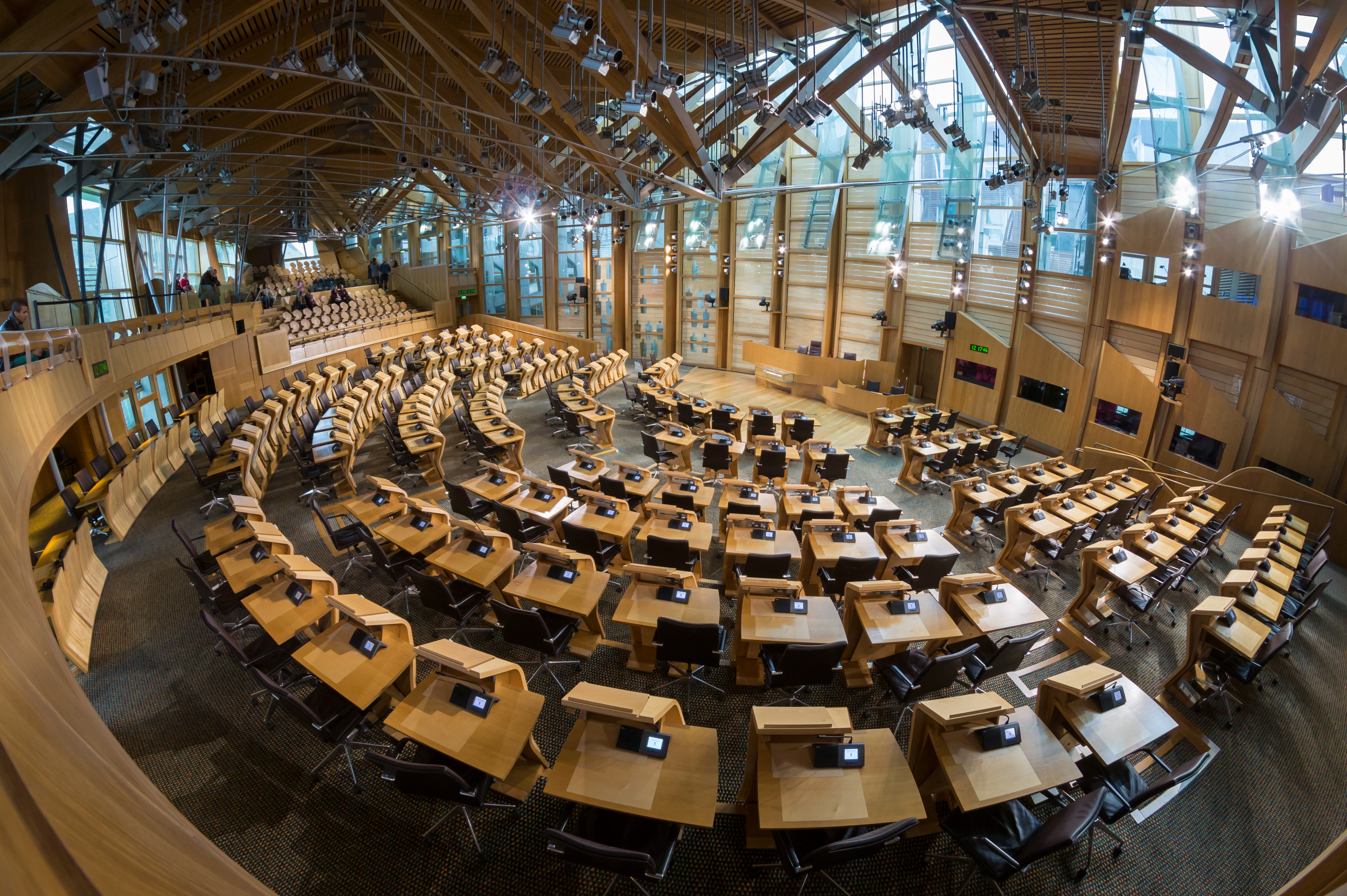
The debating chamber, where seating is arranged in a hemicycle rather than the adversarial layout of other Westminster style legislatures

The debating chamber contains a shallow elliptical horseshoe of seating for the MSPs, with the governing party or parties sitting in the middle of the semicircle and opposition parties on either side, similar to other European legislatures. Such a layout is intended to blur political divisions and principally reflects the desire to encourage consensus amongst elected members. This is in contrast to the "adversarial" layout reminiscent of other Westminster style national legislatures, including the House of Commons, where government and opposition sit apart and facing one another. There are 131 desks and chairs on the floor of the chamber for all the elected members of the Scottish Parliament and members of the Scottish Government. The desks are constructed out of oak and sycamore and are fitted with a lectern, a microphone and in-built speakers as well as the electronic voting equipment used by MSPs. Galleries above the main floor can accommodate a total of 255 members of the public, 18 guests and 34 members of the press.

The most notable feature of the chamber is the roof. The roof is supported by a structure of laminated oak beams joined with a total of 112 stainless steel connectors (each slightly different), which in turn are suspended on steel rods from the walls. The connecting nodes were fabricated by welders for Scotland's oil industry. Such a structure enables the debating chamber to span over 30 metres (100 ft) without any supporting columns. In entering the chamber, MSPs pass under a stone lintel—the Arniston Stone—that was once part of the pre-1707 Parliament building, Parliament House. The use of the Arniston Stone in the structure of the debating chamber symbolises the connection between the historical Parliament of Scotland and the present day Scottish Parliament.

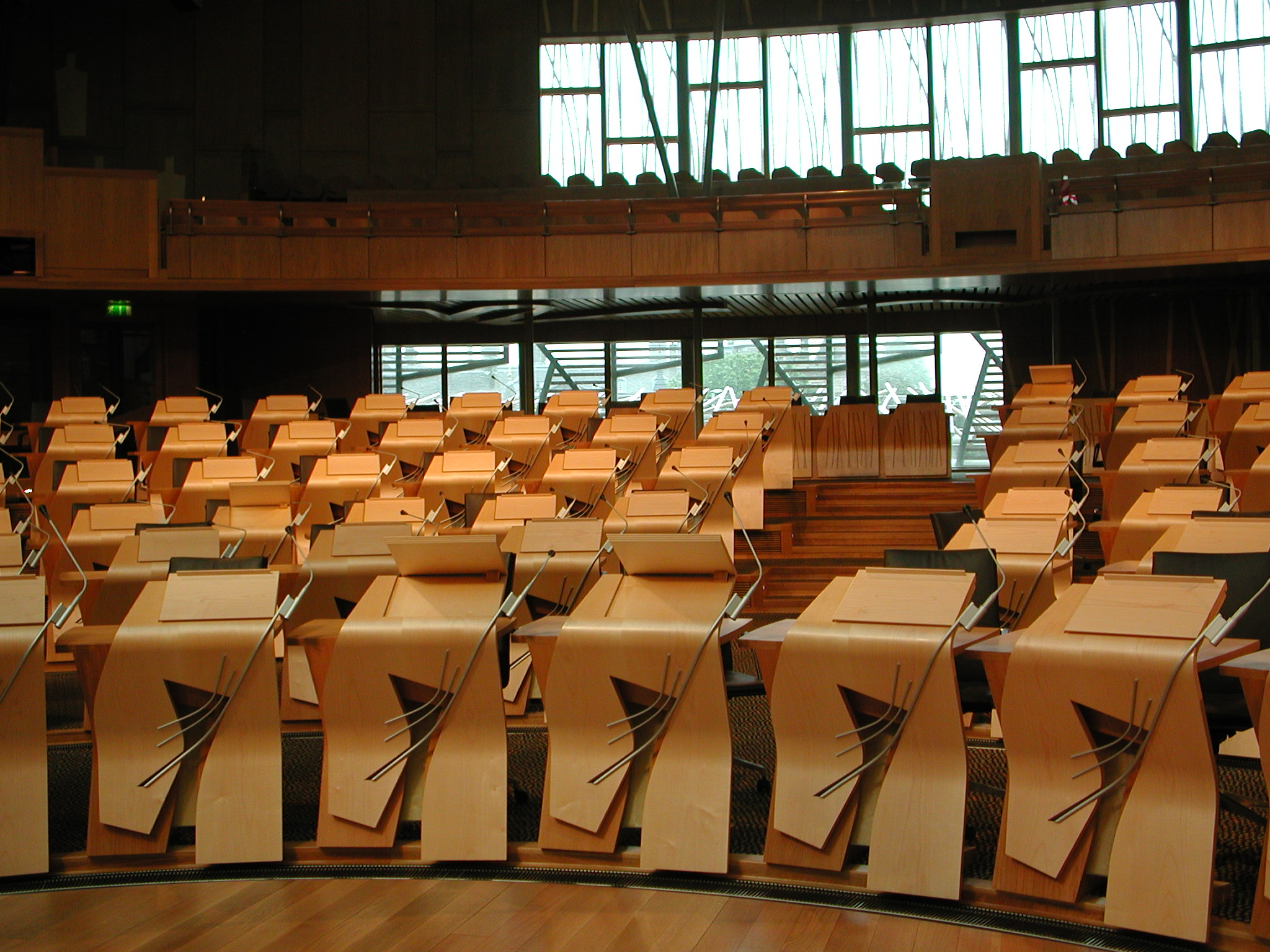
Detail of the MSPs' seating consoles

Cut into the western wall of the debating chamber are laminated glass panels, of different shapes, intended to give a human dimension to the chamber. At night, light is shone through the glass panels and is projected onto the MSPs' desks to create the impression that the chamber is never unoccupied. Natural light diffuses into the chamber and is provided by "glass fins" which run down from light spaces in the ceiling. Glimpses out of the chamber are given to the landscape and city beyond, intentionally, to visually connect the MSPs to Scotland. The necessities of a modern parliament, banks of light, cameras, electronic voting and the MSPs' console have all been transformed into works of craft and art, displaying the sweeping curves and leaf motifs that inform the rest of the building. Such is the level of craftsmanship, a result of the union of Miralles' inventive designs, superb detailing by RMJM and excellent craftsmanship in execution, that Jencks was prompted to state that the [Parliament] is "an arts and crafts building, designed with high-tech flair. You really have to go back to the Houses of Parliament in London to get interior design of such a high creative level—in fact, it is more creative".

On 2 March 2006, a beam in the roof of the debating chamber swung loose from its hinges during a debate, resulting in the evacuation of the debating chamber and the suspension of parliamentary business. Parliament moved to other premises while the whole roof structure was inspected and remedial works were carried out. The structural engineers, Arup, stated that the problem with the collapsed beam was entirely due to the failure of one bolt and the absence of another. There was no design fault. The engineers concluded, in a report to MSPs, that the damage is likely to have been done during construction work on the chamber roof, in the latter phases of the project. The report also indicated that whilst one of the bolts was missing, the other was broken and had damaged threads commensurate with being overtightened or jammed, which twisted the head off, or came close to doing so.

=== Garden Lobby ===
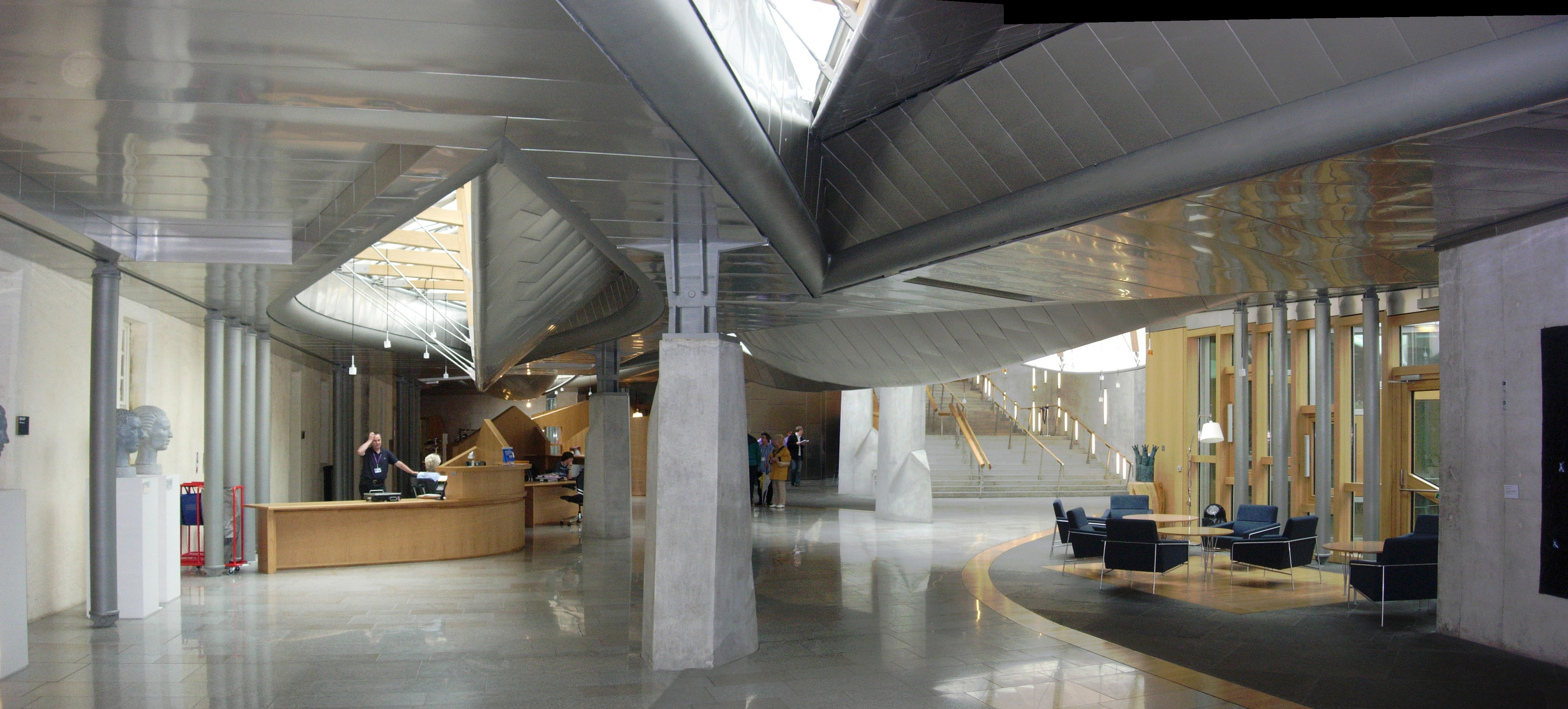
Interior view of the garden lobby

The Garden Lobby is at the centre of the parliamentary complex and connects the debating chamber, committee rooms and administrative offices of the Tower Buildings, with Queensberry House and the MSP building. The Garden Lobby is the place where official events as well as television interviews normally take place and it is used as an open social space for MSPs and parliamentary staff. The main feature of the Garden Lobby are the rooflights, which when viewed from above resemble leaves or the early Christian "vesica" shape, and allow natural light into the building. The rooflights are made from stainless steel and the glasswork is covered by a lattice of solid oak struts. The route through the Garden Lobby up the main staircase to the debating chamber has been described as "one of the great processional routes in contemporary architecture."

=== MSP building ===
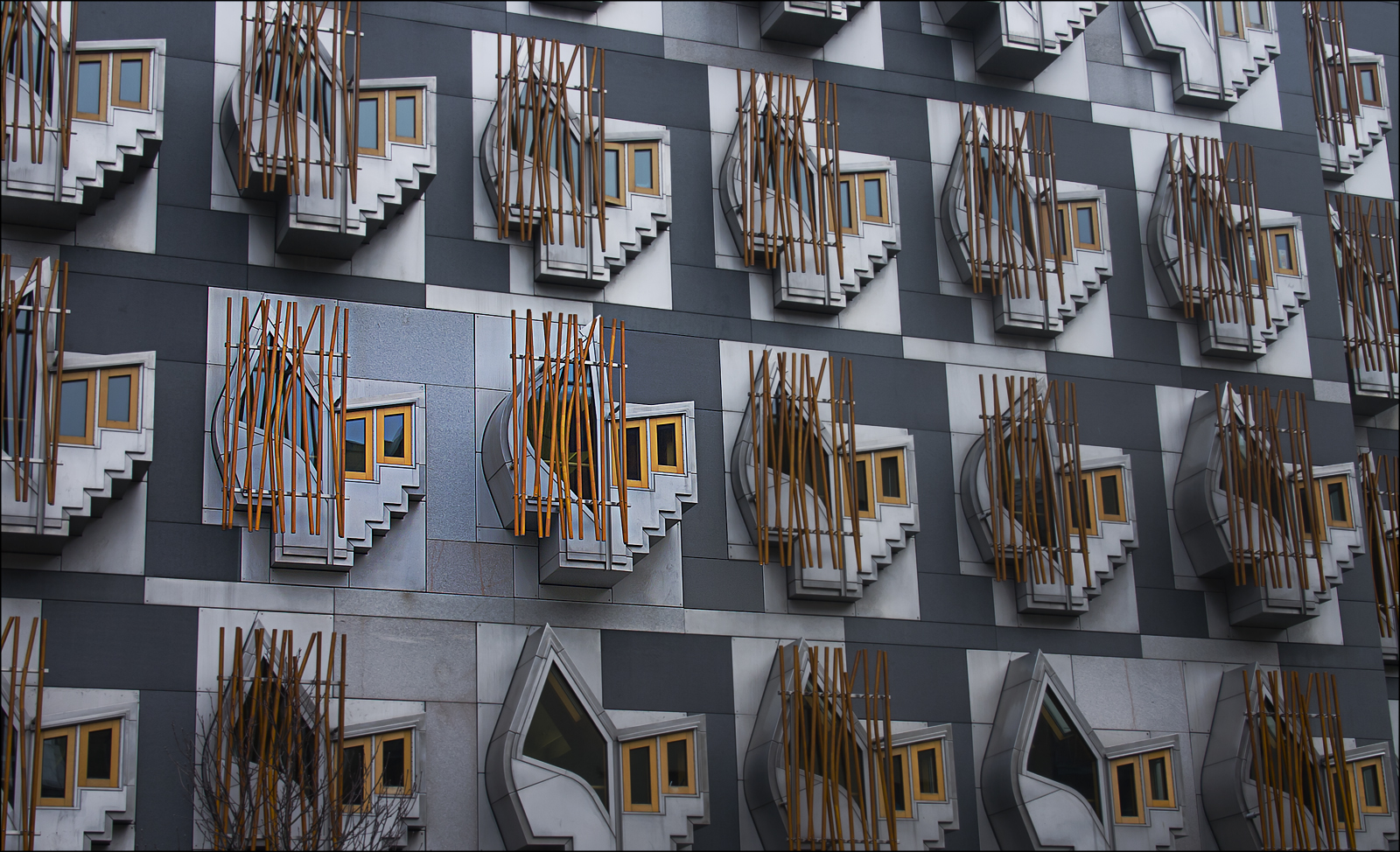
The distinctive windows of the MSP building inspired by Henry Raeburn's painting The Skating Minister

The MSP building is connected to the Tower Buildings by way of the Garden Lobby and stands at the western end of the parliamentary complex, adjoining Reid's Close. The block contains offices for each MSP and two members of staff, fitted out with custom-designed furniture. The building is between four and six storeys in height, and is clad in granite. MSPs occupy 108 of the total 114 rooms in the building. Each office is divided into two parts: one for the MSP, with a floor space of 15 square metres (160 sq ft), and another part for their staff, which has a floor space of 12 square metres (130 sq ft). The most distinctive feature of the MSP block are the unusual windows which project out from the building onto the western elevation of the parliamentary complex, inspired by a combination of the repeated leaf motif and the traditional Scottish stepped gable. In each office, these bay windows have a seat and shelving and are intended as "contemplation spaces". Constructed from stainless steel and framed in oak, with oak lattices covering the glass, the windows are designed to provide MSPs with privacy and shade from the sun. Ahead of the opening of the Parliament, some MSPs who questioned whether the design would allow sufficient natural light into their offices. To remove the uniformity from the western side of the building, the windows jut out at different widths and angles. At its north end, the building is six storeys high (ground floor plus five) stepping down to four storeys (ground floor plus three) at the south end.

=== Other buildings ===
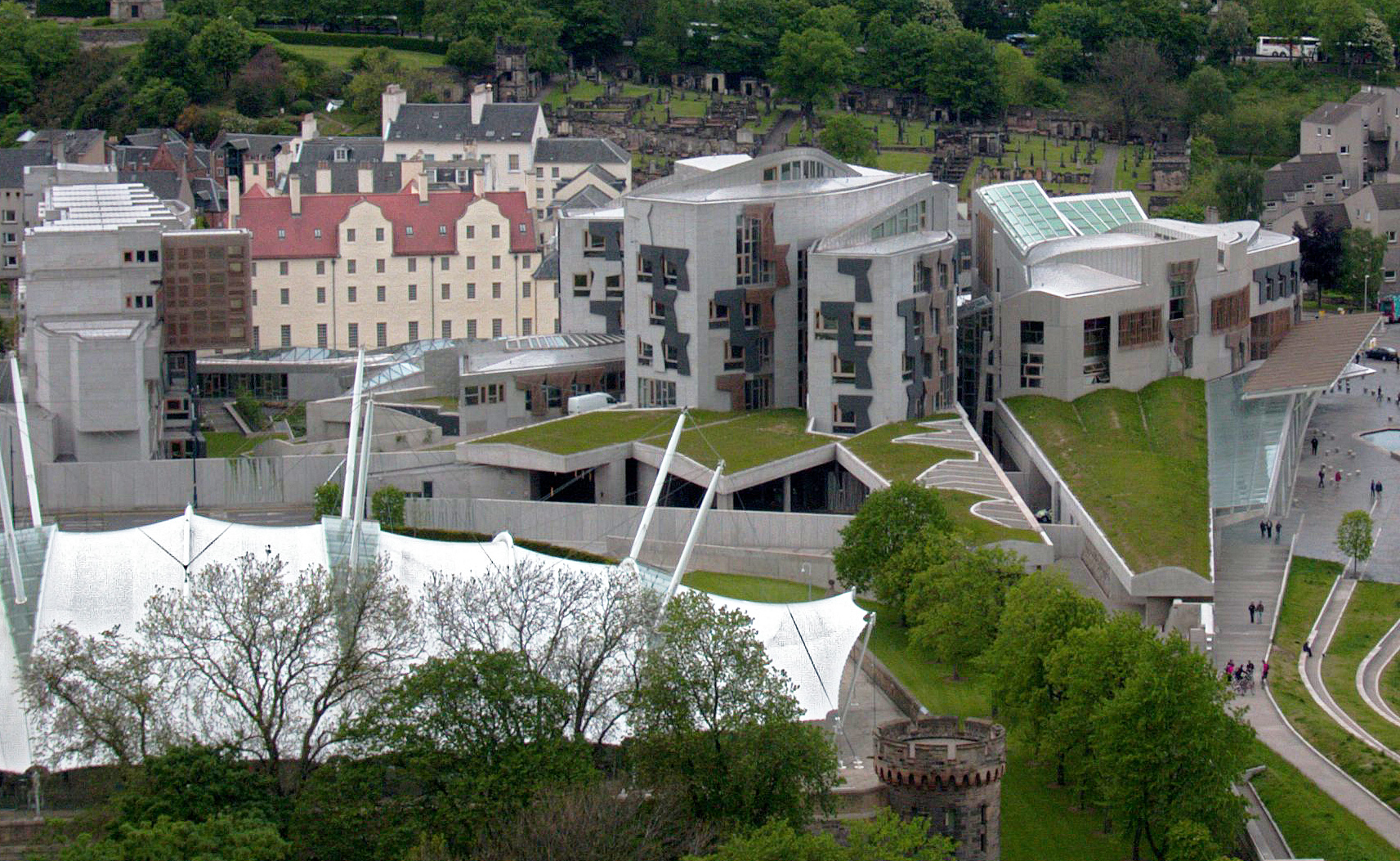
An aerial view of the Scottish Parliament Building complex. The red tiles of Queensberry House are visible between the MSP Office block at the back of the complex and the Tower and Canongate Buildings at the front which house the debating chamber and committee rooms.

Four tower buildings fan out along the front, or eastern edge, of the parliamentary complex and are notable for the curvature of their roofs. The Tower Buildings are home to the public entrance of the Scottish Parliament and to the Main Hall, which is located on the eastern side of the parliamentary complex, beneath the debating chamber. A stone vaulted ceiling is the principal feature of the Main Hall, which has cross like representations carved into it, reminiscent of the Saltire, the national flag of Scotland. The Main Hall contains permanent exhibitions on the role of the Scottish Parliament, as well as public seating, a visitor information desk, a shop, lockers and a creche. Like much of the parliamentary complex, the materials used to construct the Main Hall and its vaulted ceiling include Kemnay Granite from Aberdeenshire in north east Scotland and Caithness stone, which is used in much of the flooring in the buildings. Connected to the Tower Buildings in the eastern portion of the complex are the Media and Canongate Buildings, which house the IT and procurement departments of the Parliament, as well as media offices and the Scottish Parliament Information Centre (SPICe). The centrepiece of the Canongate Building is a two-storey cantilever structure, with the building connected at one end by reinforced concrete and 18 metres (60 ft) of the building suspended above ground and protruding outwards unsupported by any columns.

Originally dating from 1667, Queensberry House is an example of a seventeenth century Edinburgh townhouse and contrasts with the modern architecture of the rest of the parliamentary complex. From c.1800, Queensberry House has been used as a hospital, army barracks, a refuge and a geriatric hospital. In 1996, the geriatric hospital closed and the building was incorporated into the Scottish and Newcastle brewery, who owned the surrounding site. The building has been extensively refurbished, and returned to its original height of three storeys to provide facilities for the Presiding Officer, Deputy Presiding Officers, the Chief Executive of the Scottish Parliament and various parliamentary support staff. Internally and externally the building has been strengthened with reinforced steel and concrete. The original timber flooring has been replaced throughout with a mixture of carpet, vinyl, oak and Caithness stone. Queensberry House also contains the Donald Dewar Room, dedicated to the founding First Minister of Scotland, who died in October 2000. The room hosts the personal collection of books and other memorabilia donated to the Parliament by the family of Donald Dewar after his death.

=== Artwork and features ===
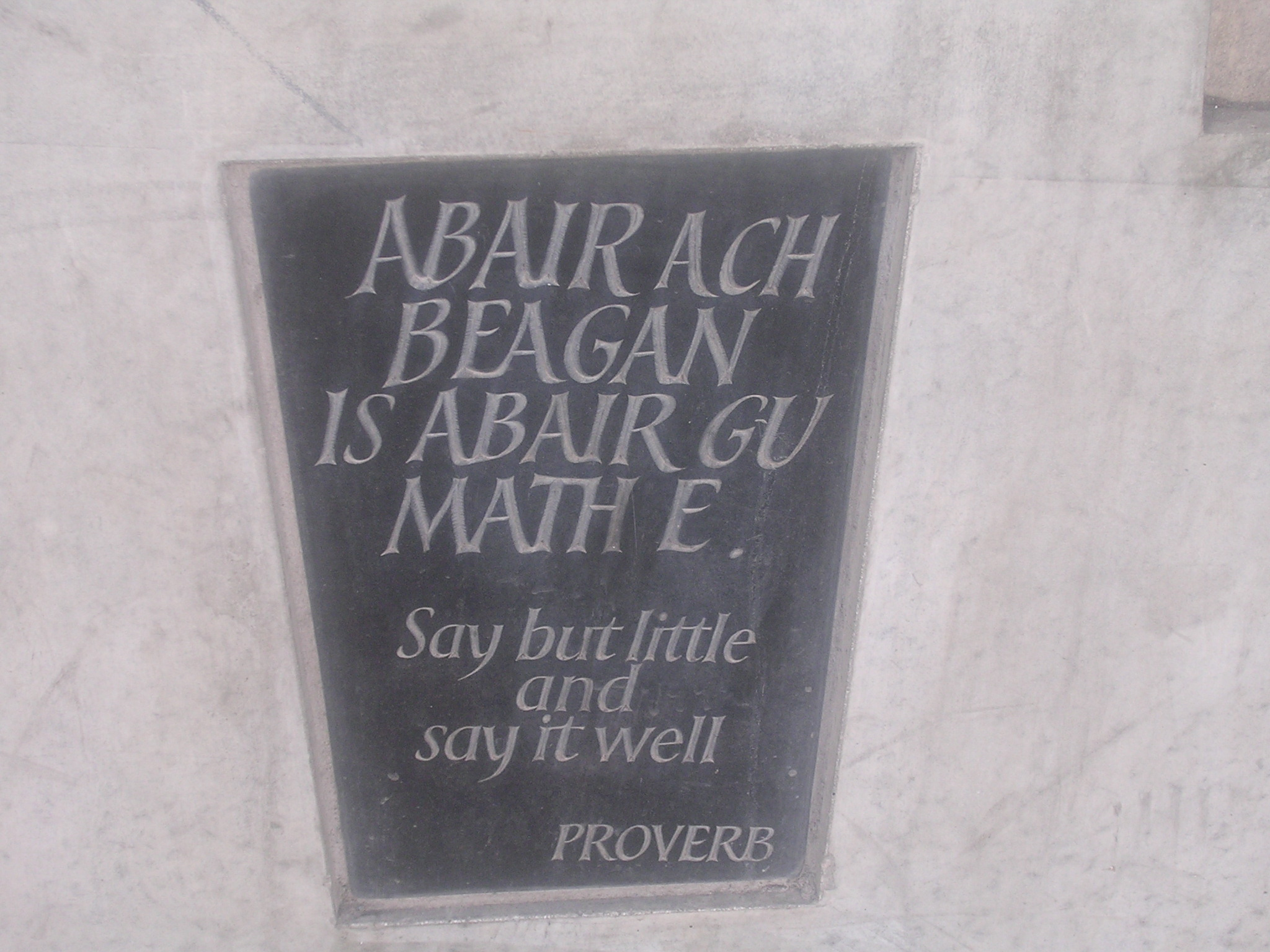
The Canongate Wall façade of the parliamentary complex has quotations inscribed onto pieces of rock.

The Scottish Parliament holds a wide variety of artwork and sculpture ranging from specially commissioned pieces to official gifts from overseas parliamentary delegations. The intention of including artwork and sculptures in the building reinforces the desire of Miralles that the project should reflect the nature of Scotland, particularly its land and people. In order to facilitate the incorporation of art into the building, a consultative steering group was established by the Scottish Parliamentary Corporate Body (SPCB) under the chairmanship of Jamie Stone MSP with the remit of deciding which artworks should be chosen. Some pieces of artwork are on public display in the building. As well as artwork and sculptures, quotations, furniture and photography have been commissioned as part of the art strategy. A range of quotations have been inscribed onto the stonework in and around the parliamentary complex. Beneath the Canongate Building façade is the Canongate Wall, constructed from a variety of indigenous Scottish rocks, such as Lewisian gneiss, Torridonian sandstone and Easdale slate. The stones are set into large concrete casts, each one inscribed with a quotation. The Canongate Wall contains a total of 24 quotations. Etched along the lower stretch of the wall is a pictorial representation of the Old Town of Edinburgh, based around a sketch by Enric Miralles, showing the view of the Old Town from his bedroom window in the Balmoral Hotel.

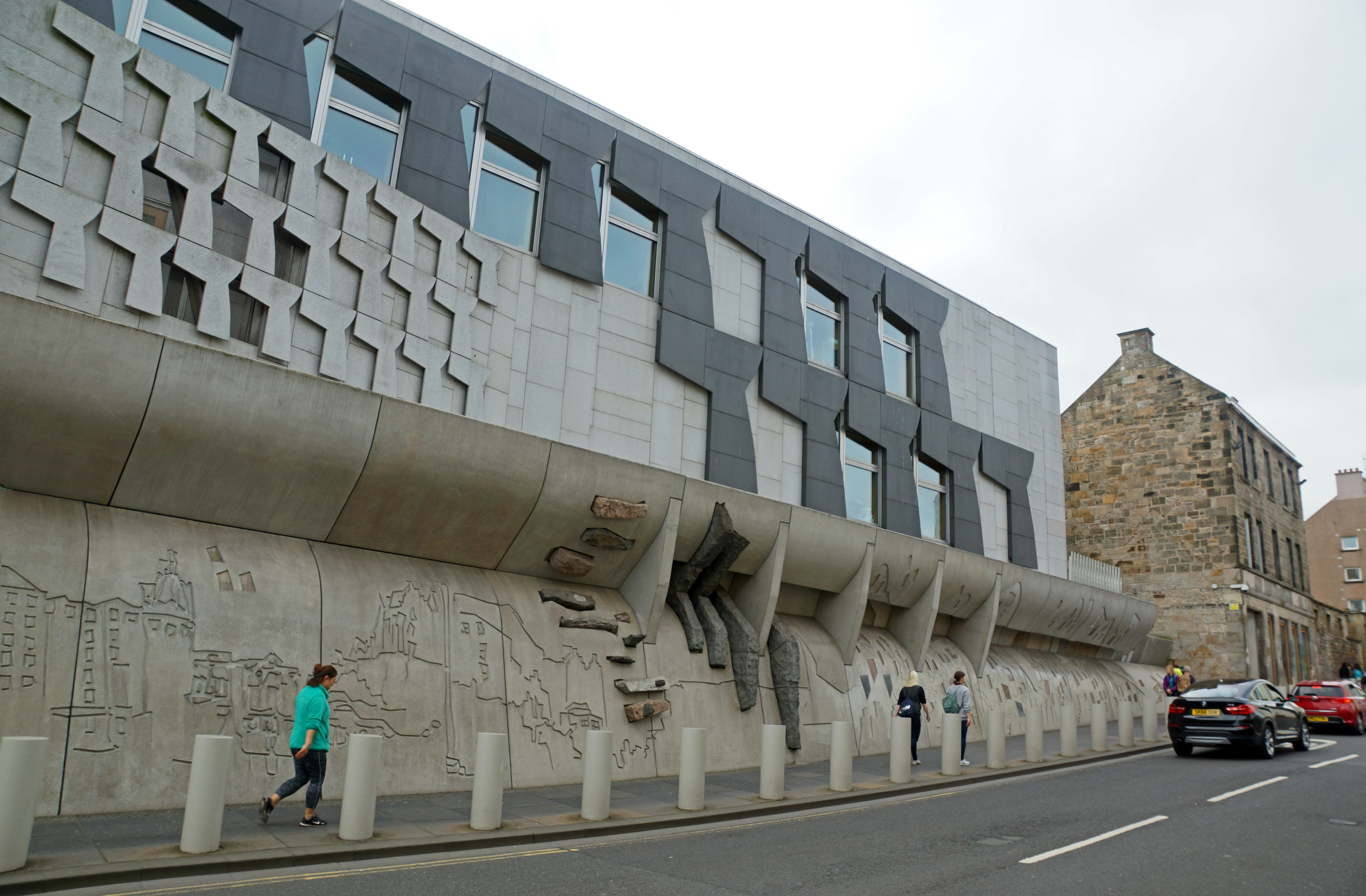
Canongate Wall

The Main Hall of the Parliament contains a number of distinctive features and sculptures, including the gold-plated Honours of Scotland sculpture. Presented by the Queen upon the opening of the Parliament building, the sculpture is modelled on the actual Honours of Scotland, the crown, sceptre and the sword of the state, and combines these three separate elements into one composition. During meetings of the original Parliament of Scotland, the actual Honours were always present, but since 1819 they have been permanently housed in Edinburgh Castle. The 11 m (36 ft) long Visitor Information Desk also stands in the Main Hall. Commissioned by the art strategy group, the desk combines a unique design constructed from oak and sycamore, and functions as a workstation for six members of parliamentary staff. At a cost of £88,000, the desk has been criticised by some over its price and functionality.

Another feature gifted to the Scottish Parliament by the Queen, following its inauguration in July 1999, is the parliamentary mace. The mace is housed in a glass case in the debating chamber, and has a formal, ceremonial role during meetings of the Parliament. The mace sits in front of the Presiding Officers' desk; it is made from silver and inlaid with gold panned from Scottish rivers, and inscribed with the words "Wisdom", "Compassion", "Justice" and "Integrity". The words "There shall be a Scottish Parliament" (which are the first words of the Scotland Act 1998), are inscribed around the head of the mace. At the beginning of each session in the chamber, the case is removed to symbolise that a full meeting of the Parliament is taking place.

== Critical response ==
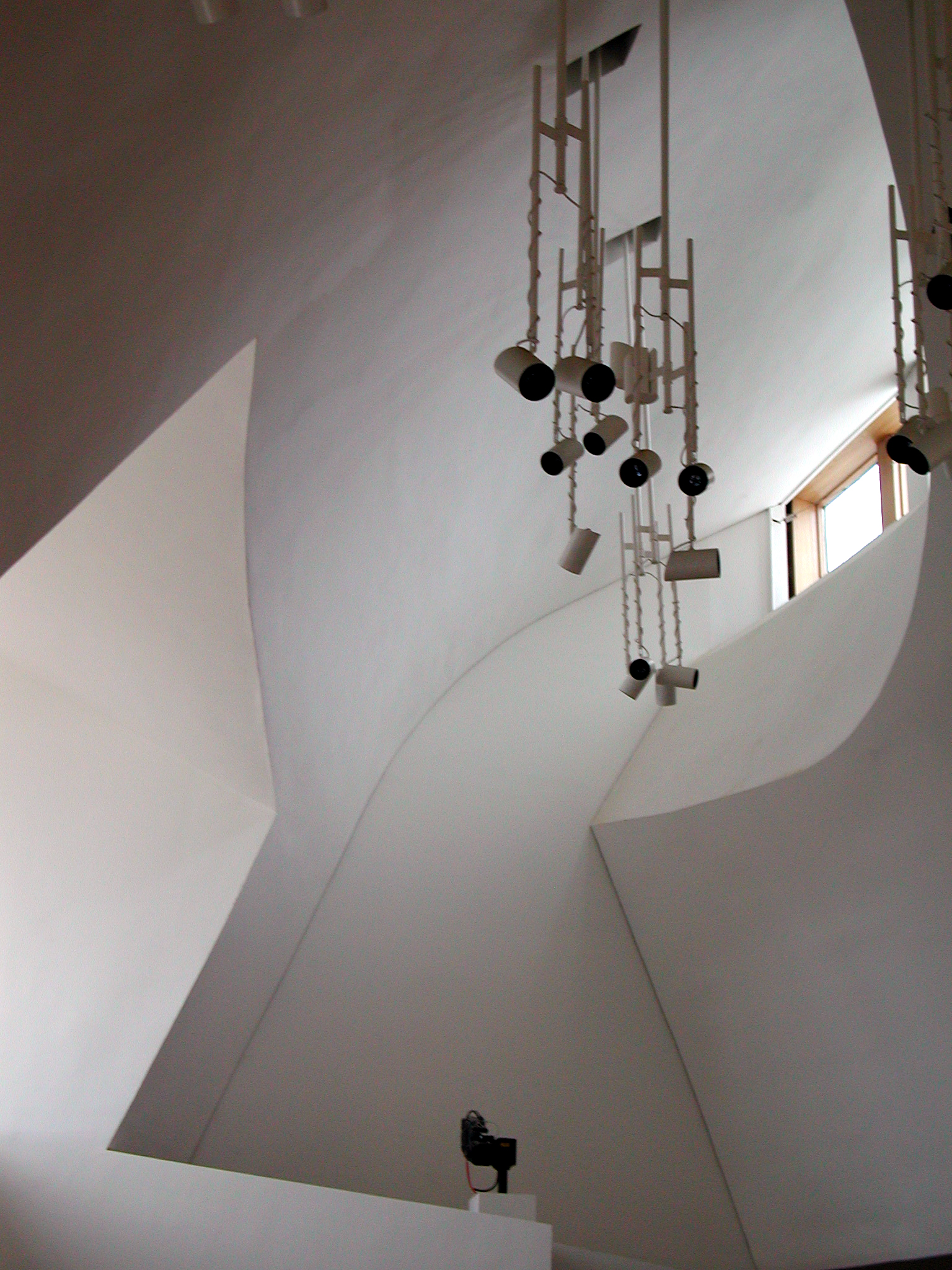
The Committee Rooms of the Scottish Parliament reflect the unique architectural style of Miralles, which has won much critical acclaim.

Public reaction to the design of the building has been mixed. In the first six months of the building being open to the public, 250,000 people visited it, which Presiding Officer George Reid has said showed the public were "voting with their feet". Critics of the building, such as Margo MacDonald, pointed out that the high number of visitors does not prove that all of them like the building. As well as the cost, which earned it the name Follyrood among critics, criticisms of the stem primarily from the modernist and abstract architecture, the quality of the construction work and the location.

The mixed public reaction contrasts sharply with the response from architectural critics. Its rampant complexity, iconography and layering of meaning and metaphor are widely regarded as producing a building which is "quite a meal". This prompted Catherine Slessor, writing in the Architectural Review, to describe it as "A Celtic-Spanish cocktail to blow both minds and budgets, it doesn't play safe, energetically mining a new seam of National Romanticism refined and reinterpreted for the twenty-first century." Jencks attempted to dampen criticism of the cost overruns by questioning how 'value for money' might be judged. For him, the building is not just a functional or economic enterprise, it is an exploration of national identity, and in comparing it to other comparable assemblies, not least the Palace of Westminster, he argues the cost is comparable. The conception of the building has been singled out for praise, particularly in the way it re-establishes Scotland's traditional focus towards mainland Europe and its values by means of the layout of the non-adversarial debating chamber, and the creation of the public spaces in front of the building, "where people can meet and express themselves as a force". In an era of the Bilbao effect and the iconic building, Jencks is impressed that rather than being a monumental building, as is usual for capital landmarks, the building creates a complex union of nature and culture that nestles itself into the landscape. A study by a construction supplies company found that 42.07% of posts on X about the building's design were negative.

The building has also won a number of awards, including an award at the VIII Biennial of Spanish Architecture, the RIAS Andrew Doolan Award for Architecture, and the 2005 Stirling Prize, the UK's most prestigious architecture award. The inclusion of the Scottish Parliament Building on the shortlist for the Stirling Prize in 2004, led the judges to describe the building as "a statement of sparkling excellence". In October 2005 the building was identified as Scotland's fourth greatest modern building by readers of Prospect. In 2004, the satirical magazine Private Eye also granted the building their Sir Hugh Casson Award for "worst new building of the year".

== Problems ==
=== Timeline of cost increases ===
The construction of the Scottish Parliament Building has generated controversy in several respects. Rising costs and the use of public money to fund the project generated most controversy. Initial estimates for constructing a new building were projected to be between £10m and £40m in 1997. By early 2004, the estimated final cost of the project was set at £430m, some ten times greater.

Date	Cost	Reason
24 July 1997	c. £10–40m	The first cost projection provided by the Scottish Office is for housing MSPs in a new Scottish Parliament. The estimate takes no account of the location or design of any new building.
6 July 1998	£50–55m	The design of Miralles is chosen and the revised estimate updates the preliminary figure recognising that the initial projection was based on a cleared site of 16,000 m^{2} (170,000 sq ft) on brownfield land in Leith, Haymarket or Holyrood. The figure does not include VAT or site acquisition costs.
17 June 1999	£109m	The First Minister, Donald Dewar, provisionally estimates the costs at £109m. The increased figure takes account of consultancy fees, site costs, demolition, VAT, archaeology work, risk and contingencies.
5 April 2000	£195m	Cost projections increase by £86m.
November 2001	£241m	The new figure is officially announced and takes into account increases in space and major design changes resulting from a changed brief over the previous year. Rising costs are also blamed on construction problems ahead of an attempt to try to complete the building project by May 2003. The then Presiding Officer, Lord Steel of Aikwood, informs the Finance Committee of the Scottish Parliament that rescheduling work is increasing costs.
December 2002	c. £300m	A cost increase to £295m in October 2002, is reported to be due to increased security needs, requiring that bombproof cladding be incorporated into designs for the external fabric of the building. Rising costs are also put down to "hidden extras" in the construction process and by December 2002 "ongoing delays" raise costs above the £300m barrier. The completion date for the building slips again, and plans for a grand "Opening Ceremony" are shelved indefinitely.
September 2003	£400m	In July, the new Presiding Officer, George Reid produces the first of his "monthly reports" on the cost and schedule of the building, and provides a figure of £373.9m. The new figure comes in the light of reports that consultancy fees for the project top £50m. By September costs break the £400m barrier and are blamed on construction problems in the interior of the building.
February 2004	£430m +	Costs are revealed to have increased again due to further problems with construction. The official opening of the building is tentatively put back again to some time in 2005, however the building finally opens in October.
February 2007	£414.4m	The final cost is announced by the Scottish Parliament Corporate Body, a reduction of £16.1m on the previous estimate.

=== Controversy ===
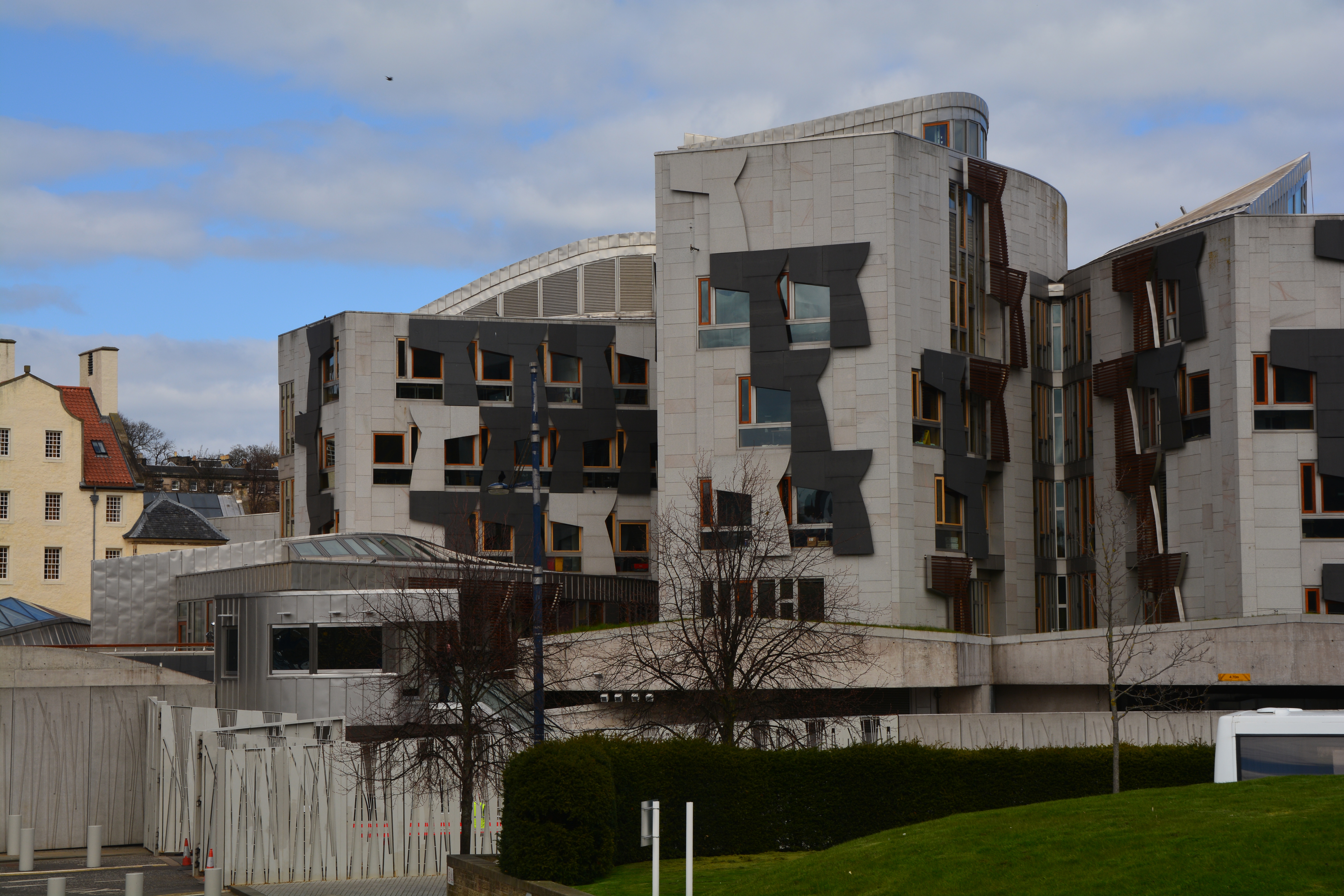
The unique architecture of the Scottish Parliament was complicated by design changes and cost increases.

Notwithstanding the level of controversy surrounding cost, the Scottish Parliament Building proved controversial in a number of other respects: the decision to construct a new building, the choice of site, the selection of a non-Scottish architect, and the selection of Bovis Lend Lease as construction manager after having earlier been excluded from the shortlist. In 1997, the initial cost of constructing a new Parliament building was given as £40 million, a figure produced by the Scottish Office, prior to the September 1997 devolution referendum, and subsequently revealed to be the figure for housing MSPs. Further controversy surrounding the project sprang from the selection of the Holyrood site, which was a late entrant onto the list of sites to be considered, and the rejection of the Royal High School on Calton Hill, long thought to be the home of any future devolved Scottish Parliament. After a formal visit to the Royal High School by Dewar and his aides on 30 May 1997, it was rejected as unsuitable on the grounds of size and location.

Control of the building project passed from the Scottish Office to the cross-party Scottish Parliamentary Corporate Body (SPCB) on 1 June 1999, headed by the Parliament's then Presiding Officer, Sir David Steel, at a time of increasing costs. Rising costs sprang from the need for a formal entrance and the need to accommodate parliamentary staff in light of better knowledge of how Parliament was working at its primary location on the Royal Mile, where it was clear there were staff overcrowding problems. With the cost increases in mind, and heightened media interest in the Holyrood Project, the Members of the Scottish Parliament held a debate on whether to continue with construction on 17 June 1999 voting by a majority of 66 to 57 in favour to complete the project.

In August 1999, the architect informed the project group that the Parliament would need to be further increased in size by 4,000 m^{2} (43,000 sq ft). A subsequent costing revealed that taking into account the increased floorspace net construction costs had risen to £115m by September 1999. Early in 2000, the SPCB commissioned an independent report by the architect John Spencely. The report concluded that savings of 20% could be made on the current project and that scrapping the project completely at that stage or moving to another site would entail additional costs of £30m. Spencely also cited poor communication between the SPCB and construction officials as increasingly costly. Given the outcomes of the Spencely report, MSPs voted to continue with the construction project on the Holyrood site in a debate in the Scottish Parliament on 5 April 2000.

The project was also complicated by the deaths of Miralles in July 2000, of Dewar the following October and the existence of a multi-headed client consisting of the SPCB, the Presiding Officer and an architectural advisor. The client took over the running of the project from the Scottish Executive (formerly the Scottish Office) while it was already under construction. Subsequently, the events of 9/11 led to further design changes, especially with regard to security, which again resulted in rising costs. However, it was later rejected that the re-designs required to incorporate greater security into the building structure were the "single biggest" factor affecting the increased costs of the project.

By March 2004 the cost had reached the sum of £430m (compared to an original budget of £55m in July 1998 when the architects were appointed). This equates to £85 for each of the 5.1 million people in Scotland. A report published by the Auditor General for Scotland in July 2004 specifically identified elements that contributed to both increasing costs and the delay in completing the project. His report criticised the overall management of the project and stated that had the management and construction process been executed better, costs could have been reduced. The report attempted to identify the reasons why there had been an acceleration in cost from £195m in September 2000 to £431m in February 2004 and concluded that over 2000 design changes to the project were a major factor. The building was finally certified for occupation in the Summer of 2004, with the official opening in October of the same year, three years behind schedule.

== Fraser Inquiry ==
In May 2003 the First Minister, Jack McConnell, announced a major public inquiry into the handling of the building project. The inquiry (known as the Holyrood Inquiry, or the Fraser Inquiry) was headed by Lord Fraser of Carmyllie and held at the Scottish Land Court in Edinburgh. The inquiry took evidence from architects, civil servants, politicians and the building companies. Evidence was taken over the course of 49 hearings and the final report ran to 300 pages.

=== Criticisms ===
Presenting his report in September 2004, Lord Fraser told how he was "astonished" that year after year the ministers who were in charge were kept so much in the dark over the increases in cost estimates. He also stated that a Parliament building of sufficient scale could never have been built for less than £50m, and was "amazed" that the belief that it could be was perpetuated for so long. He believed that from at least April 2000, when MSPs commissioned the Spencely Report to decide whether the building should continue, it should have been realised that the building was bound to cost in excess of £200m. Furthermore, £150m of the final cost was wasted as a result of design delays, over-optimistic programming and uncertain authority.

Despite having only an outline design, the designers RMJM/EMBT (Scotland) Ltd stated without foundation that the building could be completed within a £50m budget. Nevertheless, these estimates were believed by officials. The two architectural practices in the RMJM and EMBT joint venture operated dysfunctionally and failed to communicate effectively with each other and the project manager. The death of Miralles also gave rise to a substantial period of disharmony. The Brief emphasised the importance of design and quality over cost, and was not updated despite considerable evolution of the design. Ministers were not informed of grave concerns within the Scottish Office over the cost of the project and officials failed to take the advice of the cost consultants.

The Scottish Office decided to procure the construction work under a "construction management contract", rather than under a Private Finance Initiative, in order to speed construction, but without properly evaluating the financial risks of doing so, and – in a decision that Fraser stated "beggars belief" – without asking Ministers to approve it. This was one of the two most flawed decisions which the report singled out, the other was the insistence on a rigid programme. Officials decided that rapid delivery of the new building was to be the priority, but that quality should be maintained. It was therefore inevitable that the cost would suffer. The client was obsessed with early completion and failed to understand the impact on cost and the completion date if high-quality work and a complex building were required. In attempting to achieve early completion, the management contractor produced optimistic programmes, to which the architects were unwise to commit. The main causes of the slippage were delays in designing a challenging project that was to be delivered against a tight timetable using an unusual procurement route.

The inquiry was widely seen as clearing Donald Dewar for the initial mishandling of the project. This came after speculation suggesting that Dewar was aware that the initial costs of a new Parliament Building, circulated to the public, were too low. However, in his report, Lord Fraser stated "there was no evidence whatsoever, that he [Dewar] deliberately or knowingly misled MSPs. He relied on cost figures given to him by senior civil servants." The inquiry also resisted the temptation to "lay all of the blame at the door of a deceased wayward architectural genius [Miralles].....costs rose because the client wanted increases and changes or at least approved of them in one manifestation or other."

=== Reaction and recommendations ===
In his report, Lord Fraser set out a number of recommendations stemming from the inquiry. Primarily, in terms of design selection and when using an international architect linking with a Scottish-based firm, the report advised that a full analysis of the compatibility of different working cultures and practices needs to be made.

Lord Fraser advocated that when "construction management" contracts were used, civil servants or local government officials should evaluate the risks of such a contract and set out the advantages and disadvantages of embarking upon such a route before their political superiors. Alongside that recommendation, Lord Fraser stated that independent advisors should be retained and have the ability to communicate their advice to ministers, without those views being "filtered" by public officials. Similarly, where civil servants are part of large project management contracts, clear guidelines of governance should be set out and be as rigorous as standards applied in the private sector.

Following publication of the report, Jack McConnell stated that the Fraser recommendations would be fully implemented, and that fundamental reform of the civil service was already under way, with trained professionals being recruited to handle such projects. The First Minister emphasised that he was keen to see an increase in the specialist skills of civil servants, in order for them to be able to administer projects of such magnitude in the future. John Elvidge, the most senior civil servant in Scotland, admitted that best practice had not been followed and apologised for the way the project had been handled. He did not rule out the possibility of taking disciplinary action against civil service staff, although subsequent Scottish Government investigations resulted in no action being taken against individual public officials involved with the project.

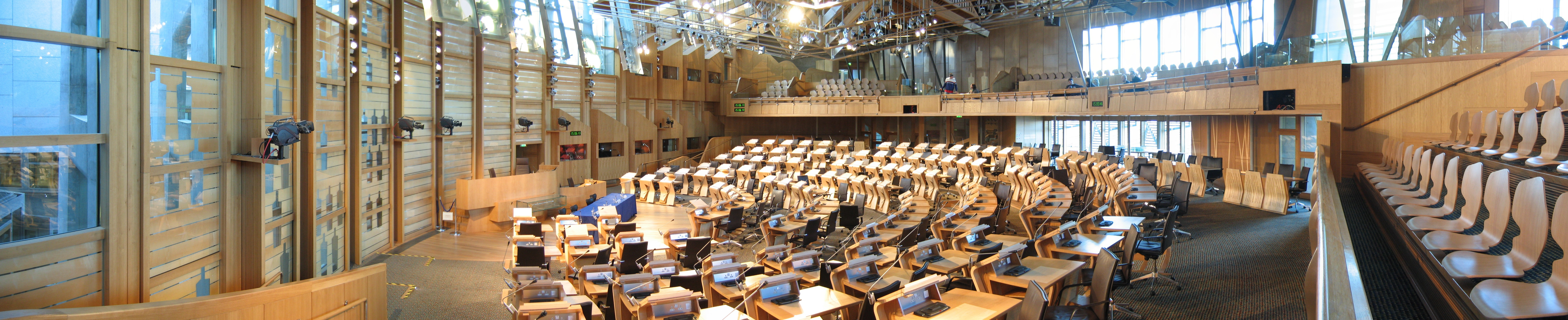
Debating chamber, showing the viewing gallery and roof construction

== See also ==
- Politics of Scotland
- Senedd building
- Parliament Buildings (Northern Ireland)
- Palace of Westminster
- City Hall, London

== Bibliography ==
- Bain, S (2004): "Holyrood – The Inside Story", Edinburgh University Press, ISBN 0-7486-2065-6
- Balfour, A & McCrone, G (2005): "Creating a Scottish Parliament", StudioLR, ISBN 0-9550016-0-9
- Black, D (2001): "All the First Minister's Men – The truth behind Holyrood", Birlinn, ISBN 1-84158-167-4
- Dardanelli, P (2005): "Between Two Unions: Europeanisation and Scottish Devolution", Manchester University Press, ISBN 0-7190-7080-5
- Miralles, E & Tagliabue, B (2001): "Work in Progress", Actar, ISBN 84-96185-13-3
- Taylor, Brian (1999): "The Scottish Parliament", Polygon, Edinburgh, ISBN 1-902930-12-6
- Taylor, Brian (2002): "The Scottish Parliament: The Road to Devolution", Edinburgh University Press, ISBN 0-7486-1759-0
- Taylor, Brian (2002): "Scotland's Parliament, Triumph and Disaster", Edinburgh University Press, ISBN 0-7486-1778-7

== Notes ==
Preceded by General Assembly Hall of the Church of Scotland	Home of the Scottish Parliament; 2004–present	Succeeded by current location
