= Queensberry House =

House in Edinburgh, Scotland

Coordinates: 55.9520°N 3.1759°W

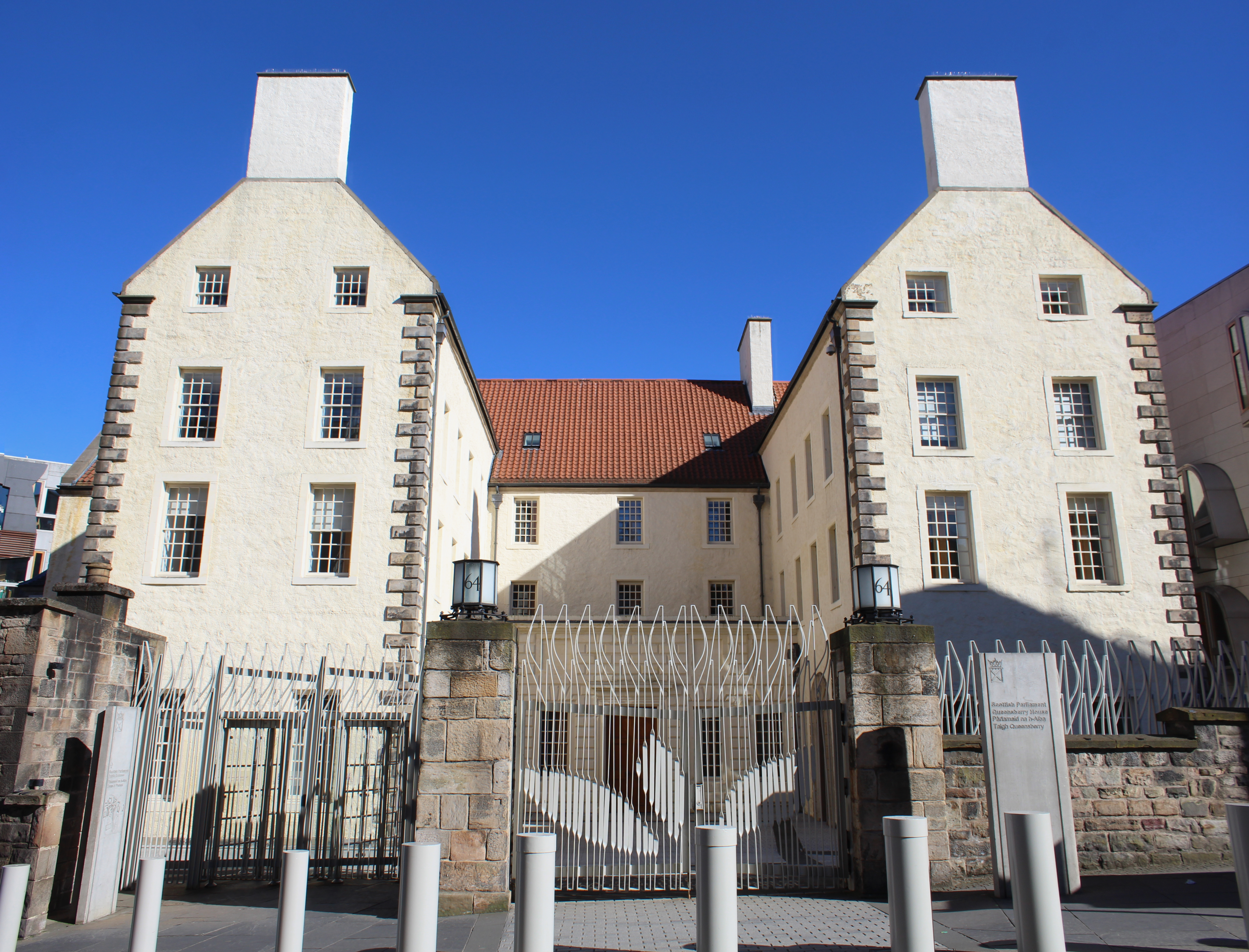
- Frontage of Queensberry House
- Interactive map of the Queensberry House area

General information
- Architectural style: 17–century town house
- Location: Queensberry House, Edinburgh, Scotland, EH8 8BZ
- Current tenants: Presiding Officer of the Scottish Parliament, Deputy Presiding Officers, Chief Executive of the Scottish Parliament
- Year built: 1667–1670
- Owner: Scottish Government

Technical details
- Floor count: 4

Design and construction
- Architect: James Smith (1770 renovation)

Queensberry House is a building of 17th-century origin which is now Category A listed by Historic Environment Scotland. It was built between 1667–1670 as a grand lodging house for Margaret Douglas of Balmakelly, and was later modified in 1681 by Charles Maitland of Hatton. The building has an extensive history, most infamously when James Douglas, Earl of Drumlanrig murdered, roasted and ate a kitchenboy in 1707, on the same night his father signed the Act of Union between the Kingdom of Scotland and Kingdom of England.

It stands on the south side of the Canongate, Edinburgh, Scotland, incorporated into the Scottish Parliament complex on its north-west corner. After various ownership changes since its opening, it was acquired by the Scottish Government in 1997 for government use, and contains the office of the Presiding Officer, two Deputy Presiding Officers, the Parliament's Chief Executive, and other staff.

== History ==
=== Origins and construction ===
The mansion house was built in 1667 for Dame Margaret Douglas of Balmakellie. In 1679, it was sold to Charles Maitland, Lord Hatton, who had been obliged to give up his 'grace and favour' accommodation at the Palace of Holyrood House. Archaeological excavations in advance of the building of the Scottish Parliament complex found evidence of metalworking in the kitchen, likely related to the assaying and refining of precious metals. Given that Lord Hatton was a Master of the Scottish Mint, the archaeologists have hypothesized that it may have been converted to a workshop to debase money from the Royal Mint. Previous domestic buildings on the site included two dwellings which the master of the king's wine cellar Jerome Bowie bought in 1581 from the family of a prominent stone mason, Gilbert Cleuch.

Maitland's house was bought by William Douglas, 1st Duke of Queensberry in 1686. He died in the house in 1695 and it then passed to his son, James Douglas, 2nd Duke of Queensberry, who was one of the Scottish peers signing the Treaty of Union in 1707. The public reaction to his involvement in the treaty was harsh, as it was seen as treasonous and self-serving, and his house was attacked by the Edinburgh mob.

On his death in 1711 the house passed to his second son and heir Charles Douglas who had been born in the house in 1698. His wife, Catherine, was the patroness of poet John Gay who visited several times.

=== Jacobite uprising ===
In 1745, Jacobite officers wounded at the Battle of Prestonpans were lodged in the house. With the opening of the New Town, many of the wealthy moved out of the area. The house ceased to be the principal residence of the dukes and was turned into rented accommodation. It was eventually sold to William Aitchison in 1801, who stripped the interior of all its fittings, like wooden panelling and fine fireplaces.

From 1803 to 1996 the building was used as a hospital. This included a period during the cholera epidemic in the 1830s when it was specifically used as a cholera hospital.

In the 1850s it was a House of Refuge and Night Asylum, i.e. a lodging house for homeless persons.

=== Government use ===
It was acquired by the Scottish Government in 1997, and became the offices of the Presiding Officer of the Scottish Parliament, the Deputy Presiding Officer of the Scottish Parliament as well as the Chief Executive of the Scottish Parliament. The new Scottish Parliament building opened in 2004, and was connected to Queensberry House, making the building the oldest part of the Scottish Parliament.

== Killing of servant ==
One evening in 1707, the 2nd Duke left the house to attend the signing of the Treaty of Union in the Parliament. An angry mob had gathered to protest against the treaty, so Queensberry was escorted by members of his household, leaving the house empty except for a young servant boy and the violently insane James Douglas, Earl of Drumlanrig, Queensberry's eldest surviving son. On his return, Queensberry discovered his son sitting in front of the kitchen fire, turning a spit on which the body of the servant was being roasted.

It was widely believed at the time that Queensberry ordered his son to be strangled on the spot. In fact, the boy was spirited away to a family estate in Yorkshire, where he died in 1715. The house is said to be haunted by the servant's ghost.

== In popular culture ==
Ian Rankin's Inspector Rebus novel Set in Darkness, first published in 2000 is partly set in Queensberry House during the reconstruction for the new parliament building.
