= Jerome Bowie =

Servant

Jerome Bowie (died 1597) was a servant of James VI of Scotland as a sommelier and Master of the Wine Cellar, in charge of the purchase and serving of wine.

== Family background ==
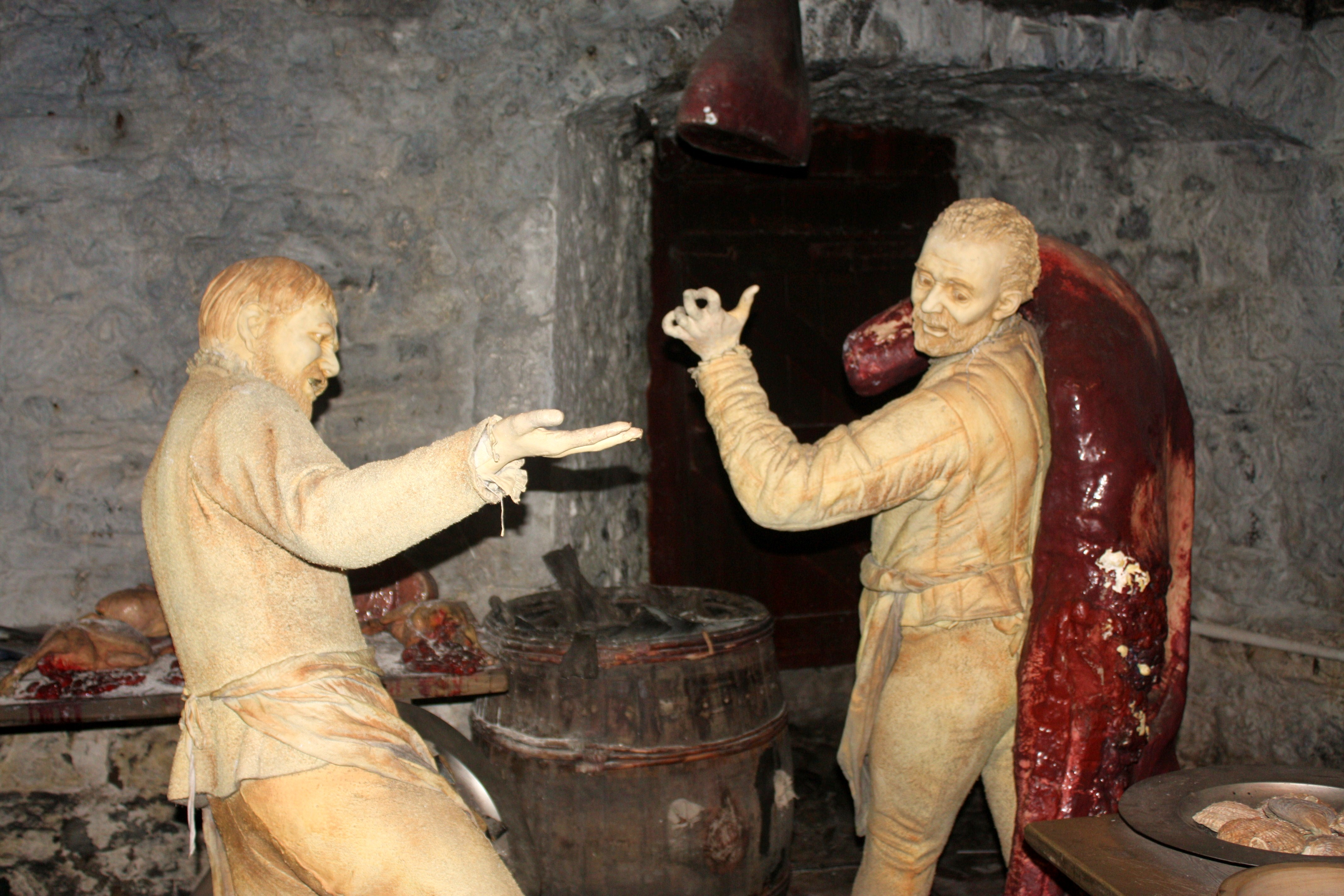
Cellar kitchen at Stirling Castle

Jerome Bowie's family was from Stirling. His father is thought to have been Andrew Bowie, a gunner employed by Regent Arran. During the war known as the Rough Wooing Andrew Bowie was hurt at the siege of Haddington in August 1548 and a "barber" cured him. He was stationed at Dunbar Castle in 1552, and at Dumbarton Castle in 1553.

== Career at court ==
Jerome Bowie was first recorded as a servant of the Earl of Mar. He helped keep a record of the expenses of James Hamilton, 3rd Earl of Arran when Arran was a prisoner in Edinburgh Castle in 1564. At that time the Earl of Mar was keeper of Edinburgh Castle.

Bowie joined the newly established household for the infant King James in March 1568, serving in the wine cellar at Stirling Castle. In February 1569, the ruler of Scotland, Regent Moray, bought a horse from Bowie, described as the Earl of Mar's servant, for £30, for the use of the king's tailor James Inglis. Bowie was confirmed as Master of the King's Wine Cellar in April 1569.

In June 1576 Bowie signed a receipt for new black clothes and hats given to him and four of the king's servants at Stirling, to improve their appearance while waiting at the royal table "when strangers are present". Like other courtiers and members of the household, Bowie gave books to the king.

As supplier of wine to the king, Bowie had considerable leverage in the Scottish wine trade. The burgh council of Edinburgh was interested in his role, and objected in May 1578 to the appointment of one Thomas Lindsay in Leith to similar duties involving the "uptaking of wine to his highness' house", insisting that town merchants could supply wine for the royal household. In some years, Edinburgh burgh council supplied wine to Bowie as part-payment of customs due to the crown.

In March 1579 the comptroller of the king's household William Murray of Tullibardine told the Privy Council that he had commissioned and made a proclamation authorising Bowie's "visiting, tasting, and uptaking wines for his Majesty's house at reasonable prices". Despite the powers given to Bowie to search for good wine in cellars and arriving ships, several merchants had not obliged. The Provost of Edinburgh Archibald Stewart and others came to defend the merchants, but the Privy Council was not impressed and set prices for Bordeaux wine and "Hottopyis bind". The latter was a Scottish merchants' term for a wine variety and is now obscure.

Bowie was made a burgess and guild brother of Edinburgh in February 1581. In 1589 Bowie went to Norway and Denmark with King James to meet his bride Anne of Denmark. In Denmark he bought baskets to pack glasses in the ship, and local beer for the voyage back to Scotland.

Bowie made an inventory of silver plate used in the king and queen's households with Andrew Melville of Garvock in October 1590, which includes two silver ships or nefs and an ostrich egg cup, described as an "ostrix eg coupe garnessit in silver dowble overgilt".

Bowie and the "sugar man", probably Jacques de Bousie, bought drinking glasses and desert bowls for the feast at the baptism of Prince Henry in August 1594. Bowie sometimes imported drinking glasses and flagons for the king's cellar from France.

== The wine impost ==
The household books of James VI and Anne of Denmark which would have recorded the wines bought by Bowie mostly do not survive, except for a few months of 1598. Much of the wine for the household was bought using a tax or custom fund called the "Impost of Wines", which was managed by John Arnot. The impost purchases were recorded in the Exchequer Rolls of Scotland. The record mentions that wine was logged in the household books and delivered to Jerome Bowie for the king's cellar and to John Bog for the queen. The wine included sweet Spanish wine and Spanish sack.

This scheme also led to conflict with the merchants. Importers made claims for rebates from the impost because of leakage and empty barrels. In 1599 an angry Edinburgh burgess James Forman entered the chamber of Anne of Denmark at Holyroodhouse, where she was talking to the Chancellor, John Graham, 3rd Earl of Montrose. He complained about various policies, speaking on behalf of the community of Edinburgh with an interesting allusion to a threatened snail, and talked with the Chancellor about the wine impost. He criticised the comptroller David Murray and the king. The incident shows that Anne of Denmark was involved in public policy. James VI was angry at her interventions in the wine trade in March 1601.

== Marriage, family, and the Canongate houses ==
Jerome Bowie married Margaret Douchall. She was the king's laundress or "lavendar", described as the "lavander for his hienes awin lining claithis". She replaced her mother, the long-serving Margaret Balcomie or Malcomy, who had washed the linen of Mary, Queen of Scots at Linlithgow and Stirling in the 1540s. Margaret Balcomie's husband John was probably a relation of William Duchale who had been a servant in the wine cellar to James V. In the 1560s, Mary, Queen of Scots gave clothes to the "little daughter of her laundress", possibly Margaret Douchall.

In 1579 James VI moved to Holyrood Palace and ordered the building of two new wash houses there for Margaret Douchall. A room or bedchamber at Holyroodhouse was refurbished for "Gyrie Bowey" (and his wife) with new glazing.

Jerome Bowie also acquired two houses on the south side of Edinburgh's Canongate which had belonged to a prominent stonemason, Gilbert Cleuch. Cleuch had given or bequeathed the houses to his daughters Margaret, who married a maltman Peter Wood, and Helen, who married William Gray. Jerome Bowie obtained possession of a part of Helen Cleuch and William Gray's property in 1581. Bowie's son James Bowie owned both properties in 1617, and his daughter Anna Bowie was the owner in 1642. Eventually these properties were bought up by Charles Maitland of Hatton and incorporated in Queensberry House, now part of the Scottish Parliament buildings.

Margaret Douchall served Anne of Denmark at Dunfermline Palace in 1600 when she was pregnant with Prince Charles. The treasurer's accounts record that beds were provided at Dunfermline for the queen's physician Martin Schöner, his man, and for "Jonet Kinloch and Jerie Bowie's wyffe".

They had three sons and three daughters, including James and Agnes Bowie who were also servants at court.

Jerome Bowie died at Stirling in October 1597. He was from Stirling and in his will requested to buried in the family Bowie's Aisle in the Church of the Holy Rude.

=== Agnes Bowie ===
Agnes Bowie was laundress to King James in England, with an annual fee of £20. She gave King James a cambric handkerchief edged with gold lace as New Year's Day gift in January 1606. Her husband, Francis Galbraith, was a servant in the royal pantry. He was made a burgess of Edinburgh in January 1589, after their marriage.

=== James Bowie ===
James Bowie, the eldest son of Jerome Bowie, became a court sommelier, from 1594 serving Prince Henry at Stirling, and moving with the court to London at the Union of the Crowns, where he was Sergeant of the Cellar. In July 1608, James Bowie was given £100 to go to France to seek wines for the king. A letter from James Hudson to the Earl of Mar in September 1616 mentions "Sargant Bowye" as a traveller to France who had met the earl's sons on their Grand Tour. Bowie was sent to France again in September 1617 with £400 for wine.

James Bowie returned to Scotland with King James in 1617 and was made a burgess of Edinburgh. Like his father, James Bowie was in charge of gold and silver plate, and he was fined when a pinnacle broke off a gold cup and was lost. James Bowie was imprisoned in the Marshalsea after a pretence of marriage with a daughter of Sir Thomas Gardiner, as he already had a Scottish wife. He was involved in some of Ben Jonson's masques, including The Irish Masque at Court, News from the New World Discovered in the Moon (1620), Pan's Anniversary (1620), The Masque of Augurs (1622), Time Vindicated to Himself and to His Honours, and The Fortunate Isles and Their Union, and seems to be the "young Bowie" that King James sent to Spain in 1623 with a message to Prince Charles and the Duke of Buckingham during the Spanish Match.
