= 1631 in literature =

This article is a summary of the literary events and publications of 1631.

== Events ==
- January 9 – Love's Triumph Through Callipolis, a masque written by Ben Jonson and designed by Inigo Jones, is staged at Whitehall Palace.
- January 11 – The Master of the Revels in England refuses to license Philip Massinger's new play, Believe as You List, because of its seditious content; it is first performed in a revised version on May 7.
- February 5 – Puritan minister and theologian Roger Williams emigrates from England to Boston in the Massachusetts Bay Colony.
- February 22 – Chloridia, the year's second Jonson/Jones masque, is performed.
- June 10 – The King's Men perform Pericles, Prince of Tyre (c.1607/8) at the Globe Theatre.
- The young Blaise Pascal moves with his family to Paris.
- Thomas Hobbes is employed as a tutor by the Cavendish family, to teach the future Earl of Devonshire.
- Publication of the "Wicked Bible" by Robert Barker and Martin Lucas, the royal printers in London, an edition of the King James Version of the Bible in which a typesetting erratum leaves the seventh of the Ten Commandments (Exodus 20:14) with the word not omitted from the sentence "Thou shalt not commit adultery". Copies are withdrawn and about a year later the publishers are called to the Star Chamber, fined £300 and have their licence to print revoked.

== New books ==
=== Prose ===
- Johann Philipp Abelin – Arma Suecica, volume 1
- Moses Amyraut – Traité des religions
- Collected works of Jacobus Arminius published posthumously in Frankfurt
- John Amos Comenius - Janua Linguarum Reserata
- Arthur Dee - Fasciculus Chemicus
- Robert Fludd – Medicina Catholica (Volume 2)
- Thomas Harriot – Artis analyticae praxis
- James Mabbe – Celestina, or the Tragicomedy of Calisto and Melibea, a 300-page closet drama or "novel in dialogue," translated from the Spanish-language original of Fernando de Rojas, La Celestina (1499)
- Wicked Bible, a reprint of the King James Bible notable for typographical errors
- William Oughtred – Clavis mathematicae

=== Drama ===
- Anonymous – Fair Em published
- George Chapman – Caesar and Pompey published
- Henry Chettle – Hoffman published
- Lope de Vega
  - Punishment without Revenge (El castigo sin venganza)
  - La noche de San Juan
- Thomas Goffe – The Raging Turk published
- Peter Hausted – Senile Odium
- Thomas Heywood – The Fair Maid of the West, Parts 1 and 2 (published; probably performed in the previous year)
- Ben Jonson
  - Chloridia (masque)
  - Love's Triumph Through Callipolis (masque)
- Ralph Knevet – Rhodon and Iris (masque)
- James Mabbe – The Spanish Bawd published
- Jean Mairet – La Silvanire, ou la Morte-vive
- Shackerley Marmion – Holland's Leaguer runs for a highly unusual six straight performances
- John Marston, with William Barkstead & Lewis Machin (?) – The Insatiate Countess published
- Philip Massinger
  - Believe as You List
  - The Emperor of the East
- Thomas May – Antigone, the Theban Princess published
- Jean Rotrou – L'Hypocondriaque
- James Shirley
  - The Traitor
  - Love's Cruelty
  - The Humorous Courtier
  - Love Tricks published as The School of Compliment
- Aurelian Townshend – Albion's Triumph (masque)
- Robert Ward (?) – Fucus Histriomastix
- Arthur Wilson – The Swisser
- Richard Zouche – The Sophister

=== Poetry ===
- Richard Braithwait – The English Gentleman

== Births ==
- January 1 – Katharine Philips (Orinda), English poet (died 1664)
- February 22 – Peder Syv, Danish philologist, folklorist and priest (died 1702)
- March 16 – René Le Bossu, French critic (died 1680)
- April – John Phillips, English satirist and nephew of John Milton (died 1706)
- July 15 – Richard Cumberland, English philosopher (died 1718)
- August 9 – John Dryden, English poet and dramatist (died 1700)
- October 18 – Michael Wigglesworth, English-born American poet and minister (died 1705)
- Unknown date – John Barret, English religious writer and Presbyterian minister (died 1713)

== Deaths ==
- February 7 – Gabriel Harvey, English poet and author (born c. 1545)
- March 31 – John Donne, English poet and Dean of St Paul's (born 1572)
- May 6 – Robert Bruce Cotton, English antiquary and founder of Cotton Library (born 1570)
- May 25 – Samuel Harsnett, English religious writer and archbishop (born 1561)
- May 26 – Enrico Caterino Davila, Italian historian, murdered (born 1576)
- July 28 – Guillén de Castro y Bellvis, Spanish dramatist (born 1569)
- September 22 – Cardinal Federico Borromeo, Italian archbishop and founder of Biblioteca Ambrosiana (born 1564)
- October 26
  - Lewis Bayly, Welsh or Scottish-born religious writer and bishop writing in English (unknown year of birth)
  - Catherine de Parthenay, Viscountess and Princess of Rohan, French Huguenot noblewoman, mathematician, poet, playwright and translator (born 1554)
- November 29 – Edmond Richer, French theologian (born 1559)
- December 23 – Michael Drayton, English poet (born 1563)
