= 1633 in literature =

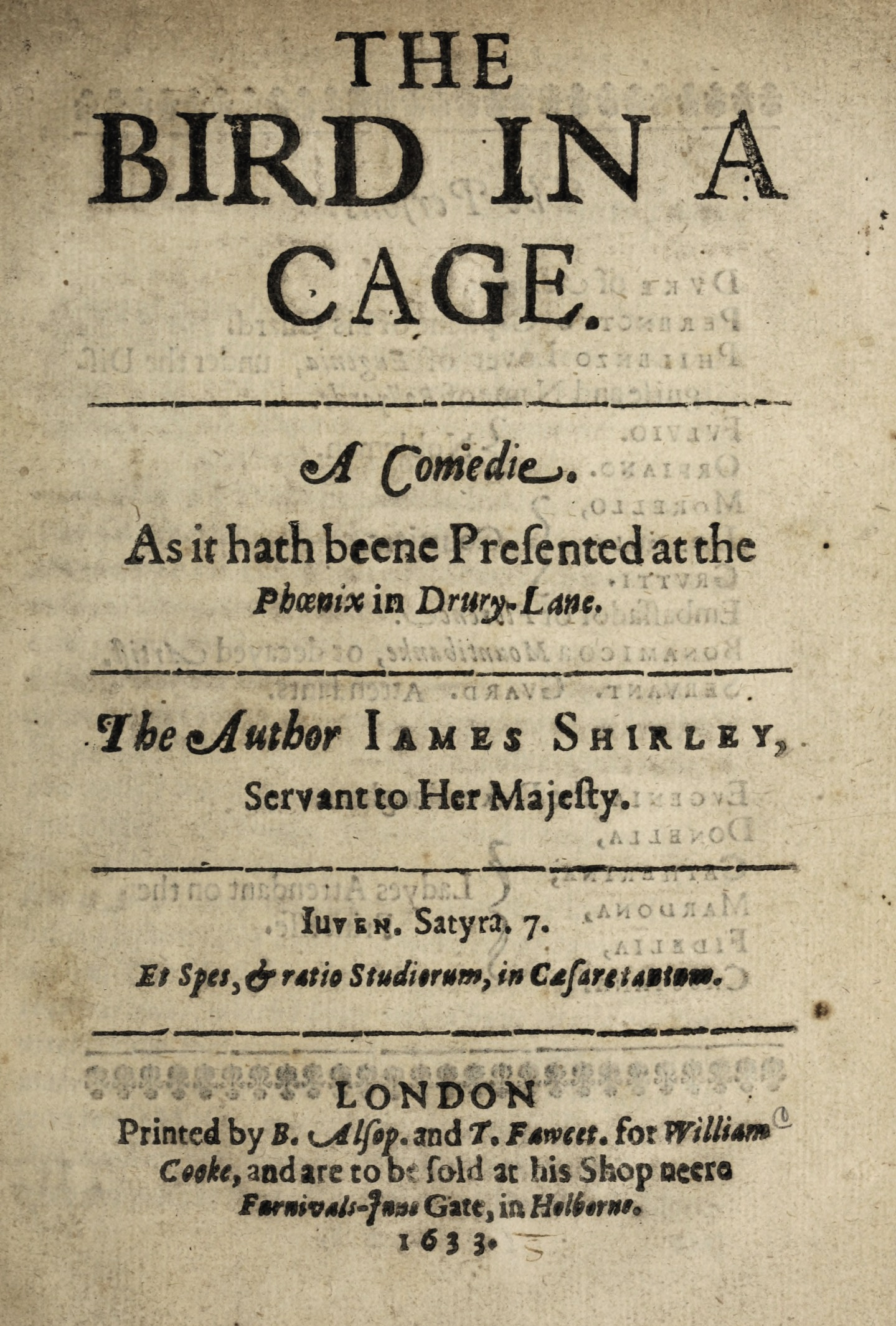

This article presents lists of the literary events and publications in 1633.

== Events ==
- May 21 – Ben Jonson's masque The King's Entertainment at Welbeck is performed.
- October 18 – King Charles I of England reissues the Declaration of Sports, originally published by his father, King James I in 1617, listing sports and recreations permitted on Sundays and holy days.
- November 17 – King Charles I of England and Queen Henrietta Maria watch the King's Men perform Shakespeare's Richard III on the Queen's birthday at St James's Palace.
- November 26 – The King and Queen watch The Taming of the Shrew at St. James's Palace.
- Queen Henrietta's Men have stage success with a revival of Marlowe's The Jew of Malta at the Cockpit Theatre, with new prologues and epilogues by Thomas Heywood and Richard Perkins in the title role. Its first known publication takes place this year in London, as The Famous Tragedy of the Rich Jew of Malta, some forty years after its first performance.
- In view of Galileo's condemnation by the Catholic Church, René Descartes abandons plans to publish Treatise on the World, his work of the past four years.

== New books ==
=== Prose ===
- William Alabaster – Ecce sponsus venit
- "Henry van Etten" (pseudonym for Jean Leurechon) – Mathematical Recreations
- Fulke Greville – Certain Learned and Elegant Works (containing the closet dramas Alaham and Mustapha)
- Thomas James – The Strange and Dangerous Voyage of Captaine Thomas James
- Thomas Stafford (ed.) – Pacata Hibernia: Ireland appeased and reduced, or, An historie of the late warres of Ireland, especially within the province of Mounster, under the government of Sir George Carew, knight

=== Drama ===
- Anonymous – The Costly Whore (published)
- Thomas Carew – Coelum Britanicum (masque)
- John Fletcher and James Shirley – The Night Walker
- John Ford (published in individual editions)
  - The Broken Heart
  - Love's Sacrifice
  - 'Tis Pity She's a Whore
- Henry Glapthorne – Argalus and Parthenia (approx. date)
- Thomas Goffe – Orestes (published)
- Peter Hausted (published)
  - The Rival Friends
  - Senile Odium
- Thomas Heywood – The English Traveller
- Ben Jonson – The King's Entertainment at Welbeck
- Siddhi Narsingh Malla, King of Nepal – Ekadashi Brata
- Christopher Marlowe – The Jew of Malta (published)
- Shackerley Marmion – A Fine Companion (published; perhaps first performed)
- John Marston – The Workes of Mr. J. Marston (first published collection)
- Philip Massinger – A New Way to Pay Old Debts (published)
- Walter Mountfort – The Launching of the Mary
- Thomas Nabbes – Covent Garden
- William Rowley (published)
  - All's Lost by Lust
  - A Match at Midnight
- James Shirley
  - The Bird in a Cage (performed and published)
  - A Contention for Honor and Riches (published)
  - The Gamester
  - The Young Admiral
- Arthur Wilson – The Inconstant Lady

=== Poetry ===
- Abraham Cowley – Poetical Blossoms
- John Donne (posthumous) – Poems, by J.D., the first collected edition
- Phineas Fletcher – The Purple Island, or the Isle of Man
- George Herbert (posthumous) – The Temple: Sacred poems and private ejaculations, the first collected edition

== Births ==
- February 23 – Samuel Pepys, English diarist (died 1703)
- July 1 – Johann Heinrich Heidegger, Swiss theologian (died 1698)
- November 11 – George Savile, 1st Marquess of Halifax, English politician and writer (died 1695)

== Deaths ==
- March 1 – George Herbert, Welsh-born English poet (born 1593)
- August 10 – Anthony Munday, English dramatist and miscellanist (born c. 1560)
- September 4 – Lady Margaret Hoby, English diarist (born 1571)
- September 27 – Cristóbal de Mesa, Spanish poet (born 1559)
- Unknown date – Richard Hawkins, English publisher (year of birth unknown)
- Probable year of death – William Bellenden, Scottish classicist (born c. 1550)
