= The Antiquary (disambiguation) =

The Antiquary might refer to:

- The Antiquary, a novel by Sir Walter Scott
- The Antiquary (play), a 17th-century play by Shackerley Marmion
- The Antiquary (magazine), a magazine published 1880–1915.
