= Love's Sacrifice =

Stage play by John Ford

Love's Sacrifice is a Caroline era stage play, a tragedy written by John Ford, and first published in 1633. It is one of Ford's three surviving solo tragedies, the others being The Broken Heart and 'Tis Pity She's a Whore.

== Date ==
The date of the play's authorship and first performance is uncertain, though some scholars cite 1633 as the most likely year. A mention of "woman antics" in Act III may refer to the performance of Walter Montague's masque The Shepherd's Paradise by Queen Henrietta Maria and her ladies in waiting in January 1633. (The production of that masque was innovative in that the aristocratic women in the cast performed spoken parts, rather than merely appearing in or dancing in the masque, which had been common for two generations.)

== Publication ==
The 1633 quarto was published by the bookseller Hugh Beeston. Ford dedicated the play to his cousin John Ford of Gray's Inn, "my truest friend, my worthiest kinsman." This second John Ford had been one of the dedicatees of Ford's The Lover's Melancholy (1629), and wrote commendatory poems to the dramatist's works. The 1633 quarto contains prefatory poems, including one by James Shirley. The title page of the quarto states that the play was acted by Queen Henrietta's Men at the Cockpit Theatre, and was "received generally well."

== Sources ==
Ford largely based the main plot of the play on the life of Carlo Gesualdo, Prince of Venosa, who murdered his first wife Maria D'Avolos after catching her with her lover. Ford probably drew upon Henry Peacham's The Compleat Gentleman as his source.

== Critical responses ==
Critics have varied in their reactions to the play. T. S. Eliot wrote that it is "disfigured by all the faults of which Ford was capable," while Ronald Huebert called it "not a great play, but...a fertile one," and "Ford's most typical play." The play is, in one view, "the most puzzling of Ford's works," and in another, "a botched mess."

== Synopsis ==
Phillippo Caraffa, Duke of Pavia, has accidentally caught sight of a beautiful young woman named Bianca, the daughter of a Milanese gentleman, while he was hunting. Caraffa falls in love with her, and marries her. Yet the Duke's close friend Fernando also falls in love with the new duchess; she rejects him at first, but eventually acknowledges similar feelings for him. Fiormonda, the widowed sister of Caraffa, has long suffered an unrequited passion for Fernando; she perceives the attraction between Fernando and Bianca, and informs her brother. Through her sycophant, the conniving villain D'Avolos, she works upon her brother's feelings of jealousy and outrage until he precipitates the final scene's violence that leaves both lovers dead ("lovers," though the affair between Fernando and Bianca is in fact never consummated physically). Caraffa joins them by taking his own life.

Love's Sacrifice, like most of Ford's plays, employs a three-level plot structure. The secondary plot yields a serio-comic treatment of the romances of Ferentes, a profligate courtier. The comic third-level subplot concerns the character Mauruccio, and provides a mirror-image portrayal of love as sham and pretense.

Critics have seen an obvious influence from Shakespeare's Othello in Ford's play. D'Avolos is a version of Iago; Bianca champions the cause of a courtier named Roselli, as Desdemona champions Cassio.

== Legacy ==
The poet Richard Crashaw refers to two of Ford's plays in a couplet in his Delights of the Muses (1646):

Thou cheat'st us, Ford: mak'st one seem two by art:
What is Love's Sacrifice but the Broken Heart?
