= The Fairy Knight =

Stuart era stage play

The Fairy Knight, or Oberon the Second is an early Stuart era stage play, a comedy of uncertain and problematic authorship. Never published in its historical period, the play existed only in a manuscript, which is now MS. V.a.128 in the collection of the Folger Shakespeare Library in Washington, D.C.

A play titled The Fairy Knight was licensed for performance by Sir Henry Herbert, the Master of the Revels, on 11 June 1624. In his records, Herbert attributed the play to John Ford and Thomas Dekker. Scholars and critics have widely rejected any application of this assignment of authorship to the extant text; in the words of Gerald Eades Bentley, "nothing in the manuscript sounds like Ford or Dekker...." Many doubt that the play licensed by Herbert in 1624 is the same as the manuscript play; the critical literature often describes the Ford/Dekker Fairy Knight as a lost work.

Fredson Bowers advanced a hypothesis that Thomas Randolph wrote the existing Fairy Knight. Bowers developed his hypothesis in his modern edition of the play, published in 1942; he argued that Randolph wrote the play for a performance at Westminster School around 1623 or 1624. Other commentators, however, have generally been unconvinced by Bowers' assignment of the play to Randolph. Some have seen signs of the influence of James Shirley in the play, noting resemblances to Shirley's The Traitor (1631) and The Young Admiral (1633), and have concluded that The Fairy Knight must post-date those plays. Since the MS. includes a 1658 epitaph (on the "virtuous lady Frances Monson"), critics tend to place the authorship of the play sometime between the mid-1630s and 1658 – generally too late for Randolph, who died in 1635. Critics have also noted borrowings from Jonson's The Alchemist in The Fairy Knight.

The play draws upon the fairy lore of the folktales and legends of the British Isles, and so can be classed with similar works like Drayton's Nymphidia. In the play, Loswello is the name of the fairy knight, while a silly politician called Politico is the pretender king of the fairies.
