= Cavalier poet =

Poet aligned with King Charles I

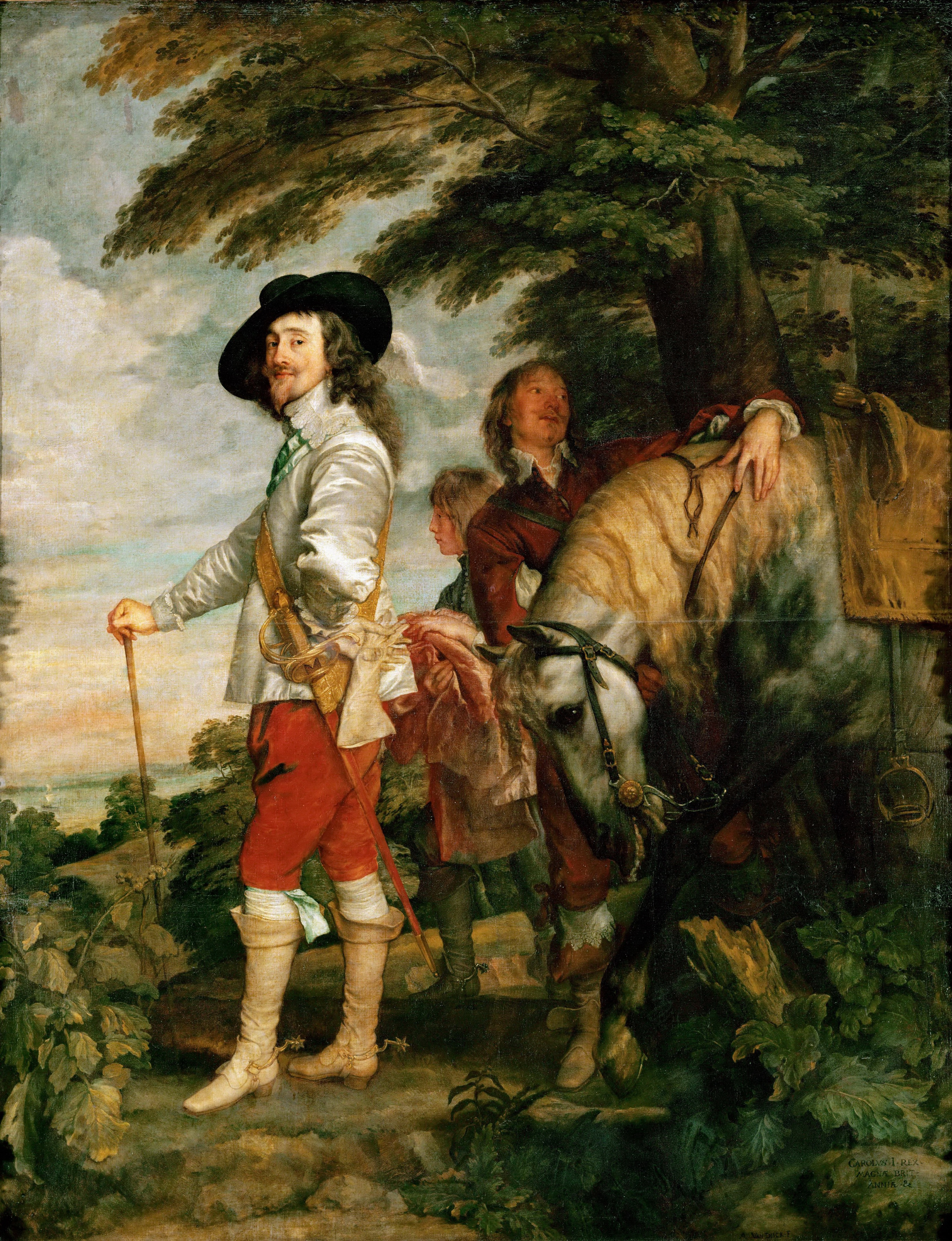
Charles I of England

The cavalier poets was a school of English poets of the 17th century, that came from the classes that supported King Charles I during the English Civil War (1642–1651). Charles, a connoisseur of the fine arts, supported poets who created the art he craved. These poets in turn grouped themselves with the King and his service, thus becoming cavalier poets.

A cavalier was traditionally a mounted soldier or knight, but when the term was applied to those who supported Charles, it was meant to portray them as roistering gallants. The term was thus meant to belittle and insult. They were separate in their lifestyle and divided on religion from the Roundheads, who supported Parliament, consisting often of Puritans (either Presbyterians or Independents).

The best known of the cavalier poets are Robert Herrick, Richard Lovelace, Thomas Carew, and Sir John Suckling. Most of the cavalier poets were courtiers, with notable exceptions. For example, Robert Herrick was not a courtier, but his style marks him as a cavalier poet.

== Characteristics ==
Cavalier poetry is different from traditional poetry in its subject matter. Instead of tackling issues like religion, philosophy, and the arts, cavalier poetry aims to express the joy and simple gratification of celebratory things much livelier than the traditional works of their predecessors. The intent of their works was often to promote the crown (particularly Charles I), and cavalier poets spoke outwardly against the Roundheads who supported the rebellion of the Rump Parliament against the crown. Most cavalier works had allegorical and/or classical references. They drew upon the knowledge of Horace, Cicero, and Ovid. By using these resources they were able to produce poetry that impressed King Charles I. The Cavalier Poets strove to create poetry where both pleasure and virtue thrived. They were rich in reference to the ancients as well as pleasing. Commonly held traits certainly exist in cavalier poetry in that most poems "celebrate beauty, love, nature, sensuality, drinking, good fellowship, honor, and social life." In many ways, this poetry embodies an attitude that mirrors "carpe diem." Cavalier poets certainly wrote to promote Royalist principles in favor of the crown, but their themes ran deeper than that. Cavalier poets wrote in a way that promoted seizing the day and the opportunities presented to them and their kinsmen. They wanted to revel in society and come to be the best that they possibly could within the bounds of that society. This endorsement of living life to the fullest, for Cavalier writers, often included gaining material wealth and having sex with women. These themes contributed to the triumphant and boisterous tone and attitude of the poetry. Platonic Love was also another characteristic of cavalier poetry, where the man would show his divine love to a woman, where she would be worshipped as a creature of perfection. As such it was common to hear praise of womanly virtues as though they were divine.

Cavalier poetry is closely linked to the Royalist cause in that the main intent of their poetry was to glorify the crown. In this way, cavalier poetry is often grouped in a political category of poetry. While most of the poetry written by these cavalier poets does advocate the cause of the monarchy in some way, not all of the writers we now consider cavalier poets knew that they fell under this categorization during their lifetime. Cavalier poetry began to be recognized as its own genre with the beginning of the English Civil War in 1642 when men began to write in defense of the crown. However, authors like Thomas Carew and Sir John Suckling died years before the war began, yet are still classified as cavalier poets for the political nature of their poetry. Once the conflict began between the monarchy and the rebellious parliament, the content of the poetry became much more specifically aimed at upholding Royalist ideals. These men were considered by many to write in a nostalgic tone in that their work promoted the principles and practices of the monarchy that was under philosophical and, eventually, literal attack.

There was also a celebration of the monarchy of Charles I among the cavalier poets. Jonson in particular celebrated ideas of common sense, duty, moderation, propriety, and elegance (which he also practiced). These ideas did not belong to the ancients but rather belonged to the court and to England. In this way although the cavaliers embraced the old ways of thinking from the ancients, they also incorporated their own ideas and thoughts into their poetry. This made their writings applicable for the era they were writing in and also portrayed the greatness of the crown and of Charles.

Other characteristics of cavalier poetry were the metaphor and fantasy.

== Issues of classification ==
According to The Columbia Electronic Encyclopedia

The foremost poets of the Jacobean era, Ben Jonson and John Donne, are regarded as the originators of two diverse poetic traditions—the Cavalier and the metaphysical styles.

English poets of the early seventeenth century are crudely classified by the division into Cavaliers and metaphysical poets, the latter (for example John Donne) being much concerned with religion. The division is therefore along a line approximating to secular/religious. It is not considered exclusive, though, with Carew (for example) falling into both sides, in some opinions (metaphysical was in any case a retrospective term). The term 'sacred poets' has been applied, with an argument that they fall between two schools:

Herbert, Crashaw and Vaughan form, not, indeed, a school of poetry, but a group with definite links connecting them. Unlike the Fletchers and Habington, who looked back to "Spenser's art and Sydney's wit," they come under the influence both of the newer literary fashions of Jonson and Fres, and of the revived spirit of cultured devotion in the Anglican church.

Others associated with the Cavalier tradition, according to Skelton, include Lord Herbert of Cherbury, Aurelian Townshend, William Cartwright, Thomas Randolph, William Habington, Sir Richard Fanshawe, Edmund Waller, and James Graham, 1st Marquess of Montrose. Because of the influence of Ben Jonson, the term Tribe of Ben is sometimes applied to poets in this loose group (Sons of Ben applies properly only to dramatist followers of Jonson).

In his introduction to The New Oxford Book of Seventeenth Century Verse Alastair Fowler makes a case for the existence of a third group centering on Michael Drayton and including William Browne, William Drummond of Hawthornden, John Davies of Hereford, George Sandys, Joshua Sylvester and George Wither.

== See also ==
- Castalian Band, royalist court poets under James VI of Scotland, father of Charles I.
- Cavalier song
- Metaphysical poets
