= A Fine Companion =

1633 play written by Shackerley Marmion

A Fine Companion is a Caroline era stage play, a comedy written by Shackerley Marmion that was first printed in 1633. It is one of only three surviving plays by Marmion.

The play was published in 1633 in a quarto printed by Augustine Matthews for the bookseller Richard Meighen. The title page of the first edition states that the play was performed by Prince Charles's Men at the Salisbury Court Theatre, and that the work was acted before King Charles I and Queen Henrietta Maria at Whitehall Palace. The original production most likely occurred in the 1632–33 period. The same company had staged Marmion's first play, Holland's Leaguer, in 1631.

Marmion based his drama on one of the popular stories in Barnabe Rich's Farewell to the Military Profession (1581). Like Marmion's other plays, A Fine Companion shows the clear and abundant influence of Ben Jonson's style of comedy. Marmion was one of the Sons of Ben, self-professed admirers and followers of Jonson.

In the 1633 first edition, the play is prefaced by a Prologue featuring an Author and a Critic, in which Marmion defends his practice of satire.

== Synopsis ==
The play opens with its lovers, Aurelio and Valeria. Aurelio is a worthy son who has been disinherited by a capricious father, in favour of his wastrel younger brother Careless (the latter is the "fine companion" of the title). The lovers' plans to marry are frustrated by Aurelio's lack of means; and they are separated physically by Aurelia's father, the usurer Littlegood.

His own father being deceased, Careless is determined to spend and enjoy his patrimony. He mortgages his lands to Littlegood and wastes his funds on high living; his tailor, sempster, and haberdasher wait upon him faithfully. He is surrounded by a set of questionable friends. Spruce is a would-be lady's man who carries a box full of pre-written love letters, only the names left blank. Captain Whipple and Lieutenant Stern are cashiered soldiers who mooch what they can.

Littlegood has two daughters and a son. In addition to Valeria there is the high-spirited Aemilia; son Lackwit is the darling of his mother, Fondling Littlegood, who encourages him to live the life of a gentleman and a gallant, much to his father's displeasure. Littlegood wants to marry off his daughters to husbands of his choice; he plans to bestow Valeria upon Spruce, and Aemilia on the elderly Dotario, the uncle of Aurelio and Careless. Aemilia, however, is determined to foil her father's plans; she prefers Careless for her husband.

Directed by Aurelio, Valeria pretends to be mad; Aurelio disguises himself as the doctor who is to cure her. Careless disguises himself as Dotario, and makes off with Aemilia. (Lackwit mistakes the real Dotario for a false Dotario, and scares him away with a longsword.) The disguised brothers marry their brides. Littlegood and Dotario are stunned to learn they've been duped, though Fondling is pleased with the results. To avoid public embarrassment and keep the family secrets, Littlegood agrees to return Careless's mortgaged lands to him, and Dotario provides Aurelio with an income.

Interspersed with the play's main plot scenes are scenes of the comic subplot, which trace the adventures of Careless, Lackwit, the Captain, and comic servants through a milieu of taverns, confidence games, and pranks. Captain Whipple is a version of the "Miles gloriosus" of classical comedy: he talks big and blusters, but is a coward at heart. He indulges in a fantastic style of speech —

There's a wench that has her suburb tricks about her, I warrant you. Hold there
Bellerophon! take thy Ocyrois, and mount her like Phlegon.

Yet by the end of the play he has been humbled: he marries the Hostess of the tavern where he resides, and becomes the Host.

== Literary connections ==
Like many Caroline era plays, Marmion's Fine Companion shows a range of resemblances with, and borrowings from, earlier works. A Match at Midnight, a play in the canon of William Rowley, bears noteworthy common features with Marmion's comedy: the old usurer (Bloodhound, Littlegood) and his rebellious children; the witty virgin (Moll Bloodhound, Aemilia Littlegood) and her decrepit old suitor (Earlack, Dotario); the usurer's silly son (Tim Bloodhound, Lackwit Littlegood); dishonest tavern-crawling discharged soldiers, etc.

In turn, Marmion's play influenced subsequent writers. A Fine Companion served "as a source for plot elements" in Richard Brome's The English Moor. During the Restoration, Thomas d'Urfey borrowed from Marmion's drama to create his Sir Barnaby Whig, or No Wit Like a Woman's (1681). D'Urfey's Captain Porpuss is modelled on Marmion's Captain Whipple. (Four years earlier, in 1677, d'Urfey had similarly plundered Marmion's The Antiquary for another of his works.)
