= Chloridia =

Play written by Ben Jonson

Chloridia: Rites to Chloris and Her Nymphs was the final masque that Ben Jonson wrote for the Stuart Court. It was performed at Shrovetide, 22 February 1631, with costumes, sets and stage effects designed by Inigo Jones.

== The masque ==
Chloridia was the second of a duet of 1631 royal masques, the first being Love's Triumph Through Callipolis, which had been staged six weeks earlier, on 9 January. In the first work, King Charles I danced; in the second, Queen Henrietta Maria starred with her ladies in waiting. Both masques dealt with the theme of Platonic love, a concept dear to the Queen's heart. Chloridia depends on rich imagery of nature, greenery, and the seasons, with figures like Zephyrus, Juno, and Iris, along with naiads and personifications of "Poesy, History, Architecture, and Sculpture." The anti-masque features dwarfs and macabre figures emerged from Hell; one of the dancers was the dwarf Jeffrey Hudson, the Queen's page and jester. The masque was as rich in spectacle as Jones's masques normally were: characters appear in clouds (a "bright cloud" and a "purplish cloud") floating in the air.

== The rivals ==
The end of Jonson's career as a masquer for the Court, however, was due not to ill health but to a clash of personalities. Jonson and Jones had been partners in the creation of masques for the Stuart Court since The Masque of Blackness in 1605; but Jonson had long nourished a resentment against Jones, feeling that the architect took and received too much credit for the success of their joint projects. The poet expressed his resentment with thinly veiled ridicule of Jones in his works, starting at least as early as Bartholomew Fair in 1614 — the character Lanthorn Leatherhead in that play being a mockery of Jones. Since Jonson arranged for the publication of the texts of his masques, his name always preceded Jones's in these volumes; but when Chloridia was published together with Callipolis, in a 1631 quarto issued by the bookseller Thomas Walkley, Jones's name was omitted entirely.

This was an insult that the very well-connected Jones was not prepared to swallow; he used his powerful Court connections to ensure that Jonson was never invited to write another masque for the Stuart Court. (Jonson's final two masques, The King's Entertainment at Welbeck and Love's Welcome at Bolsover of 1633 and 1634, were written for William Cavendish, 1st Duke of Newcastle.) When Chloridia was reprinted in the second folio collection of Jonson's works in 1641 (four years after Jonson's death), Jones was appropriately credited.

== Cast ==
The aristocratic dancers' names, listed as they were seated in the bower, were:

- Lucy Hay, Countess of Carlisle
- Countess of Berkshire
- Anne Boteler, Countess of Newport
- Anna Dormer, Countess of Carnarvon
- Olivia Porter
- Dorothy Savage

Henrietta Maria

- Beatrice van Hemmend, Countess of Oxford
- Lady Anne Cavendish
- Lady Penelope Egerton
- Elizabeth Savage
- Lady Howard
- Anne Weston
- Lady Strange
- Sophia Cary
