= The Abduction of Helen =

The Abduction of Helen may refer to one of two paintings:

- The Abduction of Helen (Genga), c.1510 painting by Genga
- The Abduction of Helen (Reni), 1628-1629 painting by Reni
