= The King's Entertainment at Welbeck =

Play

The King's Entertainment at Welbeck in Nottinghamshire, alternatively titled Love's Welcome at Welbeck, was a masque or entertainment written by Ben Jonson, and performed on 21 May 1633 at the Welbeck estate of William Cavendish, 1st Duke of Newcastle. It has been argued that the philosopher Thomas Hobbes may have participated in the entertainment as a performer.

== Background ==
When King Charles I conducted a royal progress through northern England to Scotland in the spring and summer of 1633, he stayed and was entertained at the country houses of important aristocrats. The most lavish, and in retrospect the most famous of those 1633 shows, was Jonson's at Welbeck. Charles was so pleased with it that he requested another from the same source on his 1634 progress, which resulted in the "more spectacular" show, Love's Welcome at Bolsover. Newcastle spent between £4000 and £5000 on the masque, which was considered a phenomenal sum for such an occasion – until the following year, when the bill for the Bolsover show exceeded that by £10,000.

The commission for the masque came at a welcome time in Jonson's career. After Chloridia in February 1631, Jonson no longer received commissions for masques from the Stuart Court; in his long battle of egos with Inigo Jones, Jones had finally won and Jonson had lost. In September of the same year, Jonson had also lost his post as the chronologer of the city of London. The Duke of Newcastle, who had an established relationship with Jonson, stepped in to support the poet laureate in his time of need.

== The show ==
The show opened with a scene portraying the Passions, Love and Doubt, and the Affections, "Joy, Delight, &c.," who sing with a chorus in support. After dinner, the show resumed with a dialogue between Accidence, a schoolmaster, and Fitz-Ale, a herald. The dialogue was followed by six hooded figures who give a display at the quintain, comparable to a display of jousting or "barriers." (Regarding the latter, see: The Speeches at Prince Henry's Barriers.) The quintain display was brought to a conclusion by a "Gentleman" who reproved the rustics and their sport, and hailed the King for his love, goodness, and other virtues.

This ambivalent text has been read as reflecting a larger ambivalence in the Court's position on relevant issues. Charles had re-published the Book of Sports and Jacobean proclamations urging noblemen to maintain and uphold traditional country life. Yet the Stuart Court was itself oriented far more to an urban and palatial style that tended to draw the aristocracy away from the country and toward the attractions of London.

== Texts ==
The text of the masque was published in the second folio collection of Jonson's works in 1641, and was thereafter included in his canon. A manuscript of the masque is extant among the Newcastle papers, as is the letter from Jonson that probably accompanied the delivery of the text.

== Hobbes ==
In 1998, A. P. Martinich argued that the figure of Fitz-Ale in the entertainment may have been filled by Thomas Hobbes. Martinich based his argument on details from Hobbes's published works and his known relationship with Newcastle, who patronized Hobbes as he did a range of other writers. (The idea of a philosopher turning actor may be strange to a modern sensibility. But training in rhetoric was a fundamental aspect of the trivium, the basic educational system of the day; participation in a rhetorical exercise like the Accidence/Fitz-Ale debate is comprehensible in light of that tradition.)
