= The Masque of Augurs =

Masque by Ben Jonson and Inigo Jones

The Masque of Augurs was a Jacobean era masque, written by Ben Jonson and designed by Inigo Jones. It was performed, most likely, on Twelfth Night, 6 January 1622.

A second performance of the masque, with textual revisions by Jonson, occurred on 5 or 6 May 1622. The music for the masque was composed by Alfonso Ferrabosco and Nicholas Lanier; however, only one song by Lanier has survived.

== The show ==
The masque opens with an anti-masque, a comic scene involving characters from the "court buttery-hatch," including a Lady Alwife, a brewer's clerk, and a "rare artist" named Vangoose, among others. A bearmaster named Urson introduces two dancing bears; the second anti-masque is "a perplexed dance of straying and deformed pilgrims," which is disrupted by the descent from the clouds of Apollo, the god of prophecy, who introduces the serious portion of the masque. Apollo brings with him a group of other figures from Greek mythology, including Orpheus, Linus, Idmon, and others; a dance of torchbearers and the main dance precede the concluding appearance of Jove.

The dance of the principal masquers was led by Prince Charles, later King Charles I; the masque praised the so-called "Spanish match," the plan of King James I to negotiate a marriage between his heir the Prince of Wales and the Spanish Infanta. The masque, of course, takes the position that the match will come about and be a great success – a prediction that would, over the next few years, prove totally wrong.

== Inigo Jones ==
The character Vangoose has been interpreted as one installment in Jonson's mockery of Jones, his uneasy partner in masque creation. Vangoose has a thick foreign accent that is identified as Dutch but could be perceived as mock-Welsh, a dig at Jones's ethnic background. Jonson created a whole series of such mock-Joneses in his works, starting with Lanthorn Leatherhead in Bartholomew Fair (1614) and extending through his last masque and play, Love's Welcome at Bolsover and A Tale of a Tub.

== Sources ==
Jonson employed an extensive body of intellectual and historical research on the subject of ancient Roman augury and fortune telling for his text: "The Masque of Augurs shows that Jonson knew almost everything that could be known about Roman rites of augury." Scholarship has shown that Jonson utilized dictionaries and compilations by Robert and Charles Stephanus, Natalis Comes, Johannes Rosinus, and Caspar Peucer.

== The venue ==
This masque was the first one performed in the new Banqueting House in Whitehall Palace, designed and built by Inigo Jones after the previous wooden structure burned down in January 1619. Still standing, the Banqueting House at Whitehall is often considered Jones's architectural masterpiece, and was the scene of many subsequent masques at the Stuart Court.

== Publication ==
Jonson's text was published in quarto in 1622, shortly after its first performance. (The quarto is dated "1621," meaning it was issued prior to 25 March, the old New Year's Day in England. See: Old Style and New Style dates.) The masque was reprinted in the second folio collection of Jonson's works in 1641.

== Sources ==
- Chan, Mary. Music in the Theatre of Ben Jonson. Oxford, Clarendon Press, 1980.
- Leapman, Michael. Inigo: The Troubled Life of Inigo Jones, Architect of the English Renaissance. London, Headline Book Publishing, 2003.
- Logan, Terence P., and Denzell S. Smith, eds. The New Intellectuals: A Survey and Bibliography of Recent Studies in English Renaissance Drama. Lincoln, NE, University of Nebraska Press, 1977.
- Orgel, Stephen, ed. Ben Jonson: The Complete Masques. New Haven, Yale University Press, 1969.
- Verity, Arthur Wilson, ed. Milton's Arcades and Comus. Cambridge, Cambridge University Press, 1891.
