= Love's Triumph Through Callipolis =

Play written by Ben Jonson

Love's Triumph Through Callipolis was the first masque performed at the Stuart Court during the reign of King Charles I, and the first in which a reigning monarch appeared. The work was written by Ben Jonson, with costumes, sets, and stage effects designed by Inigo Jones, and music by Nicholas Lanier.

This play was revived by the National Theatre of Greece in 1979 together with Johnson's masques Oberon, the Faery Prince and News from the New World Discovered in the Moon.

== Masquing resumed ==
At the start of his reign in 1625, King Charles discontinued the practice of staging annual masques during the Christmas season, which had prevailed throughout the reign of his father James I, from The Masque of Blackness in 1605 to The Fortunate Isles and Their Union in 1625. His new bride, Henrietta Maria of France, was too young and inexperienced to take over the role of the previous queen, Anne of Denmark, who had been the prime mover in the production of the masques. The resumption of masquing in 1631 has been seen as a sign of the greater maturity and the growing influence of Charles's then 21-year-old queen.

== King and courtiers ==
Love's Triumph Through Callipolis, performed at Whitehall Palace on 9 January 1631, was only the first of two masques mounted at Court that winter season; the second was Chloridia, staged on 22 February. The first masque featured King Charles himself, performing with fourteen lords of his Court; the second featured Henrietta Maria and her ladies in waiting. The former circumstance constituted a major innovation: in the previous reign, Queen Anne had regularly appeared in masques, but the King never did. Charles would perform again in the next year's masque, Albion's Triumph by Aurelian Townshend (designed again by Inigo Jones), and in subsequent masques as well.

Both the text of the masque and Charles's personal participation in it supported his traditionalist position of absolute royal authority. Yet three of the noblemen who participated in the masque with Charles, the Earls of Pembroke, Newport, and Holland, were dissenters from Charles's policy of personal rule; they were part of the Parliamentary party at Court that would assert itself a decade later.

== Platonic love ==
Both of the 1631 masques deal with the theme of Platonic love, a concept dear to the heart of Henrietta Maria; she was at the center of a Court circle that favored the concept. Callipolis is an idealized Platonic city, dedicated to virtue and beauty. At the start of the masque, however, the suburbs of Callipolis have been penetrated by twelve depraved and sensuous lovers – "A glorious boasting lover," "A whining ballading lover," etc., down to "A sensual brute lover." These figures, shown in the anti-masque, are not English but from continental European nations. This, however, is not an indictment of the Queen's origin in France; to the contrary, the masque specifies that if the King embodies "heroic love," the Queen, as the loved one or the object of that love, is essential to the affirmative whole that the masque celebrates. The depraved lovers perform a complex dance through circles and mazes; once they are expelled, the place is purified with censors and the proper and ordering love of the King and Queen is celebrated, with the usual mythical figures of the masque form – Oceanus and Amphitrite, sea gods and cupids, Jupiter, Juno, and others.

== Publication ==
Shortly after their performances, both 1631 masques, Callipolis and Chloridia, were published together in a quarto issued by the bookseller Thomas Walkley. (The 1631 quarto was dated "1630," since prior to 1751 England started the New Year on 25 March instead of 1 January. See: Old Style and New Style dates.) Callipolis was reprinted in the second folio collection of Jonson's works in 1641.
