= The Fairy Prince =

- Masque by Thomas Arne
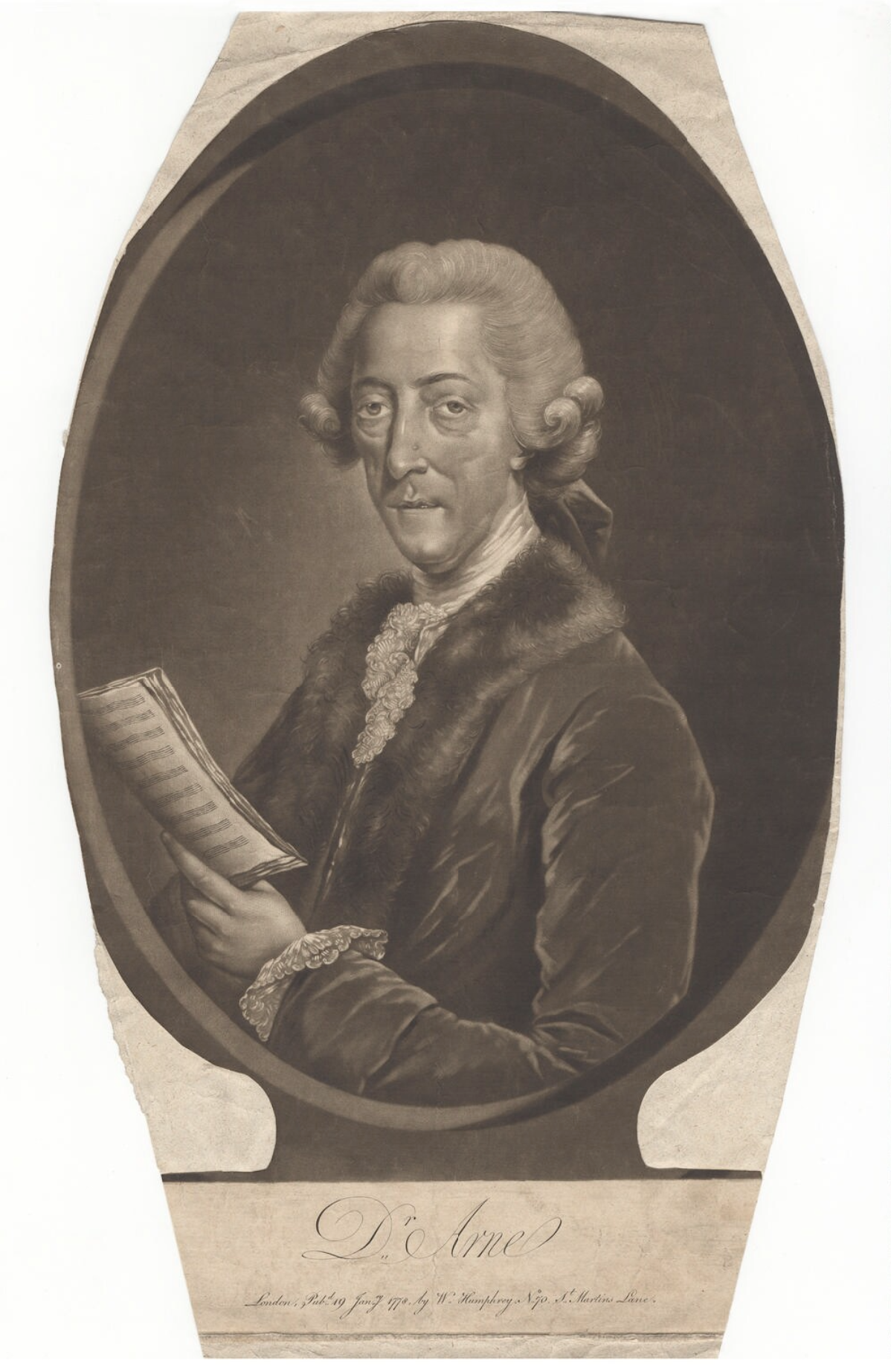
- 1778 portrait of Arne
- Librettist: George Colman the Elder
- Based on: Jonson's Oberon, the Faery Prince
- Premiere: 12 November 1771; Covent Garden Theatre, London

The Fairy Prince is a masque in three acts by composer Thomas Arne. The English libretto, by George Colman the Elder, is based on Ben Jonson’s Oberon, the Faery Prince (1611). The work premiered at the Covent Garden Theatre, London, on 12 November 1771.

== History ==
Despite being designated as a masque, the work is sung throughout, and is in many respects reminiscent of a comic opera. It is set by Windsor Castle, and depicts satyrs and fairies who guard the castle and its inhabitants during ceremonial occasions. The masque concludes with a banquet with the King and Queen in attendance. Of particular note is the wood nymphs’ aria "Let us play and dance and sing", which has a large range of approximately 2 and a half octaves and has some impressive coloratura passages. The Act 1 choral finale, "Then all the air shall ring", is also particularly fine.

The Fairy Prince was very well received at its premiere and was performed 36 times during the 1771-1772 season. While critics and audiences praised both the music and the elaborate sets of the production, the work was strangely never revived. The masque's score was published in 1771 but without the dance music, recitatives, and some of the choruses.

== Sources ==
- Casaglia, Gherardo (2005). "The Fairy Prince, 12 November 1771". L'Almanacco di Gherardo Casaglia (in Italian).
