= Thomas Carew =

English poet

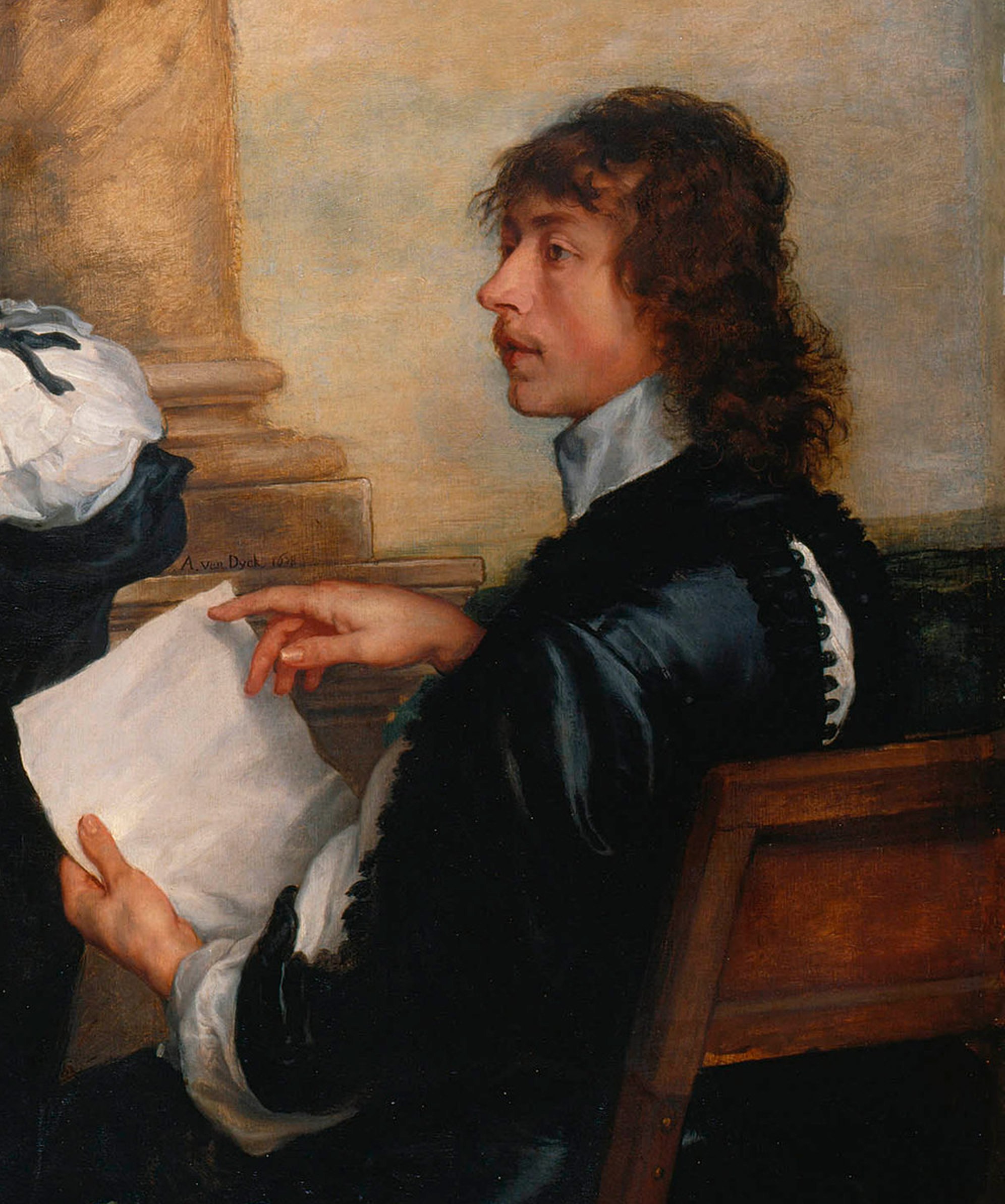
- Possible likeness of Carew from a double portrait by Anthony van Dyck
- Born: 1595; West Wickham, Kent, England
- Died: 22 March 1640 (aged 44–45)
- Education: Merton College, Oxford.
- Occupation: courtier
- Writing career
- Genre: Poetry

Thomas Carew (pronounced as "Carey") (1595 – 22 March 1640) was an English poet, among the 'Cavalier' group of Caroline poets.

== Biography ==
He was the son of Sir Matthew Carew, master in chancery, and his wife Alice, daughter of Sir John Rivers, Lord Mayor of the City of London and widow of Ingpen. The poet was probably the third of the eleven children of his parents, and was born in West Wickham in Kent, in the early part of 1595; he was thirteen years old in June 1608, when he matriculated at Merton College, Oxford. He took his degree of B.A. early in 1611 and proceeded to study at the Middle Temple. Two years later his father complained to Sir Dudley Carleton that he was not doing well. He was therefore sent to Italy as a member of Sir Dudley's household and, when the ambassador returned from Venice, he seems to have kept Thomas Carew with him, for he was working as secretary to Carleton, at the Hague, early in 1616. However, he was dismissed in the autumn of that year for levity and slander; he had great difficulty in finding another job. In August 1618 his father died and Carew entered the service of Edward Herbert, Baron Herbert of Cherbury, in whose train he travelled to France in March 1619, and it is believed that he remained with Herbert until his return to England, at the close of his diplomatic missions, in April 1624. Carew "followed the court before he was of it," not receiving the definite commitment of the Chamber until 1628.

According to a probably apocryphal story, while Carew held this office he displayed his tact and presence of mind by stumbling and extinguishing the candle he was holding to light Charles I into the queen's chamber, because he saw that Lord St Albans had his arm round her majesty's neck. The king suspected nothing, and the queen heaped favours on the poet. Probably in 1630 Carew was made "server" or taster-in-ordinary to the king. To this period may be attributed his close friendships with Sir John Suckling, Ben Jonson and Edward Hyde, 1st Earl of Clarendon; the latter described Carew as "a person of pleasant and facetious wit." John Donne, whose celebrity as a court-preacher lasted until his death in 1631, exercised a powerful influence over the genius of Carew. In February 1633 a masque by the latter, Coelum Britanicum, was acted in the Banqueting House at Whitehall, and was printed in 1634.

The close of Carew's life is absolutely obscure. It was long supposed that he died in 1639, and this has been thought to be confirmed by the fact that the first edition of his Poems, published in 1640, seems to have a posthumous character but Clarendon tells us that "after fifty years of life spent with less severity and exactness than it ought to have been, he died with the greatest remorse for that licence". If Carew was more than fifty years of age, he must have died during or after 1645, and in fact there were final additions made to his Poems in the third edition of 1651. Izaak Walton tells us that Carew in his last illness, being afflicted with the horrors, sent in great haste to "the ever-memorable" John Hales (1584–1656); Hales "told him he should have his prayers, but would by no means give him then either the sacrament or absolution."

== Assessment ==
Carew's poems are sensuous lyrics. They open to us, in his own phrase, "a mine of rich and pregnant fancy." His metrical style was influenced by Jonson and his imagery by Donne, for whom he had an almost servile admiration. Carew had a lucidity and directness of lyrical utterance unknown to Donne. It is perhaps his greatest distinction that he is the earliest of the Cavalier song-writers by profession, of whom John Wilmot, Earl of Rochester, was a later example, poets who turned the disreputable incidents of an idle court-life into poetry which was often of the rarest delicacy and the purest melody and colour. The longest of Carew's poems, "A Rapture," would be more widely appreciated if the rich flow of its imagination were restrained by greater reticence of taste. A testimonial to his posterity is that he was analyzed by 19th century critics such as Charles Neaves, who even two centuries later found Carew on the sensuous border of propriety.

== Critical reception ==
Carew has long been recognized as a notable figure in English literary history. His earliest critics – chiefly other poets – evidently knew his work from the many manuscripts that circulated. Among many others, two of the most celebrated writers of the age, Sir John Suckling and William Davenant, paid tribute to Carew, playfully admiring his poetic craftsmanship. Carew's reputation, however, experienced a slow but steady decline during the second half of the seventeenth century. Despite some interest in Carew in subsequent years, not until the twentieth century did critics offer a reexamination of Carew's place in English literary history. F. R. Leavis wrote in 1936: "Carew, it seems to me, has claims to more distinction than he is commonly accorded; more than he is accorded by the bracket that, in common acceptance, links him with Lovelace and Suckling." More recently, Carew's place among the Cavalier Poets has been examined, as have his poetic affinities with Ben Jonson and John Donne; "A Rapture" has been scrutinized as both biography and fantasy; the funerary poetry has been studied as a subgenre; evidence of Carew's views concerning political hierarchy has been found in his occasional verse; and love and courtship have been probed as themes in the "Celia" poems. By the end of the twentieth century, Carew has been recognized as an important poet representative of his time and a master lyricist. According to Edmund Gosse, "Carew's poems, at their best, are brilliant lyrics of the purely sensuous order."

American author and naturalist Henry David Thoreau used Thomas Carew's poem "The Pretensions of Poverty" as a "complemental verse" to conclude the "Economy" chapter in his 1854 book Walden.

== Major poetry ==
Poems. By Thomas Carew, Esquire is a collection of lyrics, songs, pastorals, poetic dialogues, elegies, addresses, and occasional poems. Most of the pieces are fairly short—the longest, "A Rapture," is 166 lines, and well over half are under 50 lines. The subjects are various: a number of poems treat love, sex, and feminine beauty. Several of the poems, including "An Elegie upon the death of the Deane of Pauls, Dr. John Donne" are memorial tributes; others, notably "To Saxham," celebrate country-house life; and a few record such events as the successful production of a play ("To my worthy Friend, M. D’Avenant, upon his Excellent Play, The Iust Italian") or the marriage of friends ("On the Marriage of T. K. and C. C. the Morning Stormie").

Many of the songs and love poems are addressed to the still-unidentified "Celia," a woman who was evidently Carew's lover for years. The poems to Celia treat the urgency of courtship, making much of the carpe diem theme. Others commend Celia through simile, conceit, and cliché. The physical pleasures of love are likewise celebrated: "A Rapture" graphically documents a sexual encounter through analogy, euphemism, and paradox, while "Loves Courtship" responds to the early passing of virginity. A number of Carew's poems are concerned with the nature of poetry itself. His elegy on John Donne has been praised as both a masterpiece of criticism and a remarkably perceptive analysis of the metaphysical qualities of Donne's literary work. English poet and playwright Ben Jonson is the subject of another piece of critical verse, "To Ben. Johnson, Upon Occasion of His Ode of Defiance Annext to His Play of The New Inne." This poem, like the elegy on Donne, is concerned with both the style and substance of the author's literary works as well as with personal qualities of the author himself. Among Carew's occasional, public verse are his addresses to ladies of fashion, commendations of the nobility, and laments for the passing of friends or public figures, such as Gustavus Adolphus, King of Sweden.

== Bibliography ==
- Thomas Carew (1810). A selection from the poetical works of Thomas Carew [ed. by J. Fry.].
- Thomas Carew (1824). The works of Thomas Carew: reprinted from the original edition of MDCXL (1640). Printed for W. and C. Tait.
- Thomas Carew (1870). The Poems of Thomas Carew: Sewer in Ordinary to Charles I. and a Gentleman of His Privy Chamber. Roxburghe Library. pp. 242–.
- Thomas Carew (1893). The poems and masque of Thomas Carew...: With an introductory memoir, an appendix of unauthenticated poems from mss., notes, and a table of first lines. Reeves and Turner.

== See also ==
- Country house poems

== Sources ==
- Jessopp, Augustus (1887). "Carew, Thomas" . In Stephen, Leslie (ed.). Dictionary of National Biography. Vol. 9. London: Smith, Elder & Co.
- Gosse, Edmund William (1911). "Carew, Thomas" . Encyclopædia Britannica. Vol. 5 (11th ed.). p. 328.
- Author and Book Info.com
