= Love's Welcome at Bolsover =

Play written by Ben Jonson

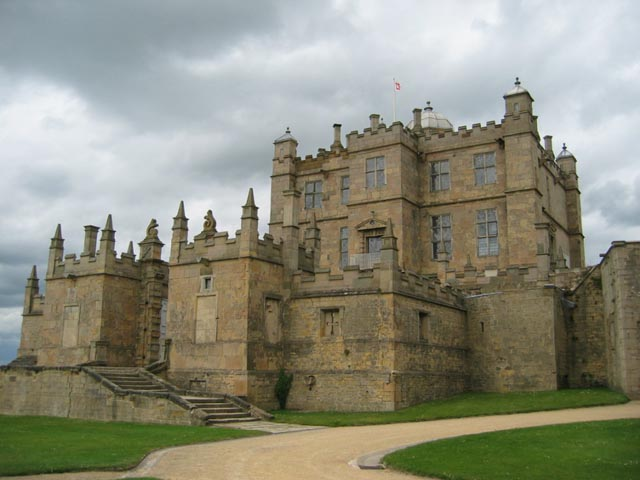
The Little Castle at Bolsover

Love's Welcome at Bolsover is the final masque composed by Ben Jonson. It was performed on 30 July 1634, three years before the poet's death, and published in 1641.

== At Bolsover ==
The masque was not produced by the Stuart Court in one of the royal palaces around London, as many of Jonson's notable early masques were. Rather it was staged by William Cavendish, 1st Duke of Newcastle (at the time, he was the Earl of Newcastle) at Bolsover Castle in Derbyshire, in honor of King Charles I and Queen Henrietta Maria.

The Earl of Newcastle had put on a Jonson masque for his royal visitors at Welbeck in Nottinghamshire the year before, The King's Entertainment at Welbeck, performed on 21 May 1633. It was such a success that the King requested another on his 1634 royal progress.

According to Margaret Cavendish, Duchess of Newcastle-upon-Tyne, the Duke spent between £14,000 and £15,000 on staging the Bolsover masque and providing for his royal guests and their attendants, which was more than double the £4,000 to £5,000 he had spent for the Welbeck entertainment the previous year. The Masque of Beauty, one of Jonson's early Court masques, had cost £4,000 to stage in 1608, and was considered exorbitantly expensive at the time.

The masque was performed at or after a banquet, a meal consisting of dessert dishes, rather than supper or dinner. The text states the King and Queen were "at Banquet". The banquet and the masque probably took place in the "Pillar Parlour" at Bolsover Castle.

== In the pillar parlour ==
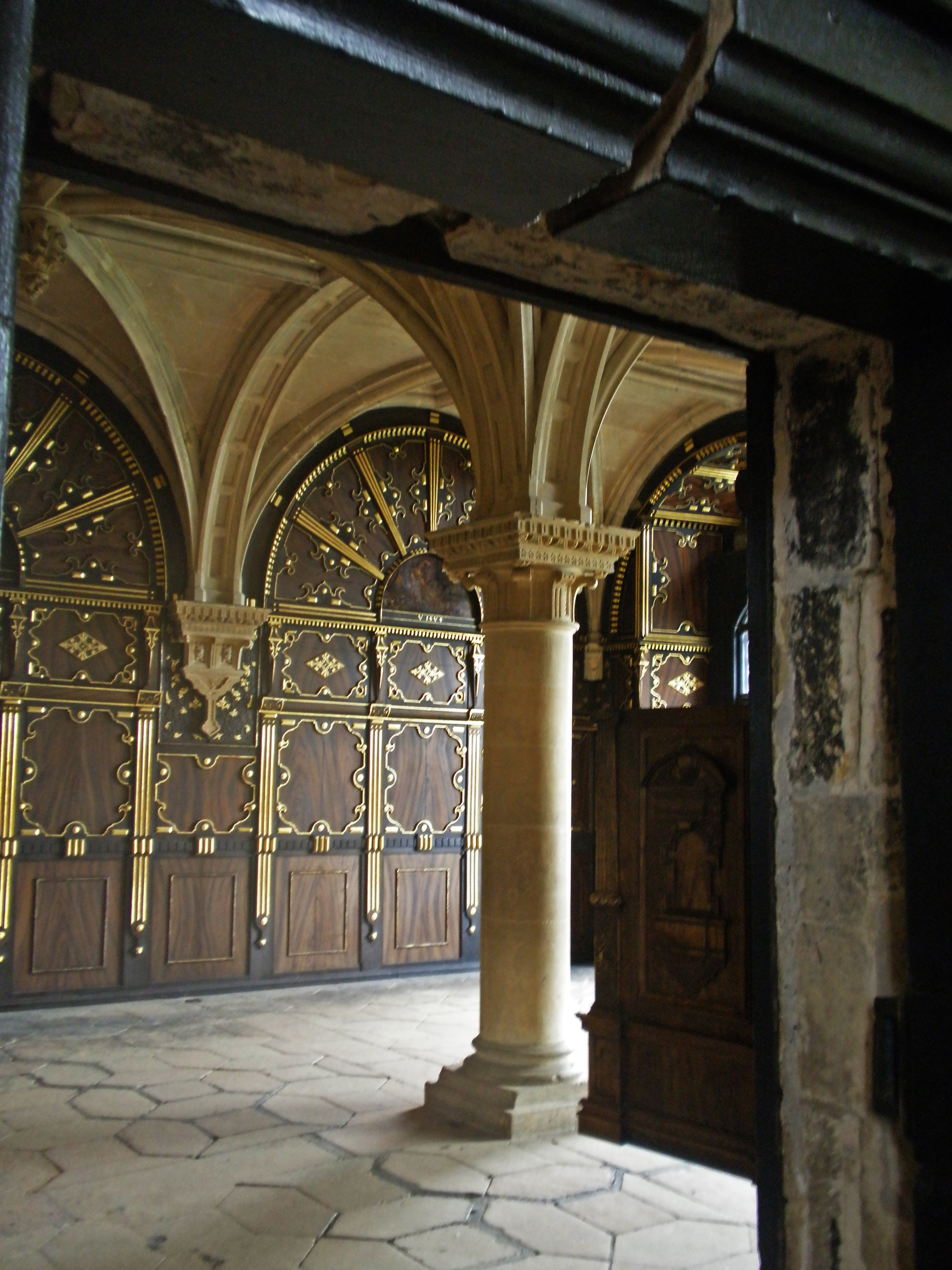
The pillar parlour at Bolsover Castle with its original panelling and restored decoration.

The masque was staged in what was called the "little castle" at Bolsover, a then-recent (Jacobean) construction. The pillared hall or parlour was furnished with five brilliantly colored paintings on the theme of The Senses. Jonson alludes to the paintings in his text, and their arrangement in the Neoplatonic hierarchy:

When were the senses in such order placed?
The sight, the hearing, smelling, touching, taste,
All at one banquet?

== Mathematical boys ==
After the song of welcome and the conclusion of the banquet, the next part of the entertainment was the "Dance of Mechanics". Jonson continued his playful sport with Inigo Jones that he had practiced for two decades, starting with Bartholomew Fair (1614) and continuing through The Masque of Augurs (1622), Neptune's Triumph for the Return of Albion (1624), The Staple of News (1626), and A Tale of a Tub (1633).

In this part of the masque, Jones is personified as "Colonel Iniquo Vitruvius", and encourages craftsmen to dance, including a metal-smith, a woodcarver, a mason, a plumber, and a glazier, as his "true mathematical boys",

Well done my musical, arithmetical, geometrical gamesters! Or rather, my true mathematical boys! It is carried in number, weight, and measure as if the airs were all harmony and the figures a well-timed proportion!

== Second banquet ==
Another banquet or dessert descended from a cloud and was served with a dialogue by Eros and Anteros, the King's love and the Queen's love. A character Philalethes describes the place of Eros and Anteros in an academy of love. The edge of Derbyshire is a region of ale, whose inhabitants will not believe the audience members' rhyming reports of the show.

== Response ==
The show was described by local witnesses as "stupendous," more than adequate to establish Newcastle's reputation as the greatest "prince...in all the northern quarter" of the kingdom. Perhaps the most visually striking element in the masque lay in the two Cupids, Eros (Love) and Anteros (Love Returned), who descended "from the clouds" bearing fronds of palms.

James Howell referred to Jonson's criticisms of Inigo Jones in July 1635, saying his ink had so "bespattered and shaken the reputation of a royal architect; for reputation, you know is like a fair structure long time a rearing, but quickly ruin'd".

== Publication ==
The masque was published in 1641 in the second folio collection of Jonson's works, and was thereafter included in his canon, although it does not appear in Stephen Orgel's "Complete Masques of Ben Jonson". Manuscripts text of the masque are also extant, in the collection of Newcastle manuscripts including British Library Harley 4955.
