= Sons of Ben (literary group) =

Followers of Ben Jonson in English poetry and drama

Sons of Ben were followers of Ben Jonson in English poetry and drama in the first half of the seventeenth century. These men followed Ben Jonson's philosophy and his style of poetry. Unlike Jonson, they were loyal to the king.

Sons of Ben were the dramatists who were overtly and admittedly influenced by Jonson's drama, his most distinctive artistic achievement. Joe Lee Davis listed eleven playwrights in this group: Richard Brome, Thomas Nabbes, Henry Glapthorne, Thomas Killigrew, Sir William Davenant, William Cartwright, Shackerley Marmion, Jasper Mayne, Peter Hausted, Thomas Randolph, and William Cavendish.

The term, or the alternative "Tribe of Ben," was a self-description by some of the Cavalier poets who admired and were influenced by Jonson's poetry, including Robert Herrick, Richard Lovelace, Sir John Suckling, and Thomas Carew. Jonson and his followers congregated at London taverns, especially the Apollo Room in the Devil Tavern, near Temple-Bar. Above the mantelpiece in this room Jonson inserted a marble slab engraved with his Leges Conviviales, or 'Rules of Conviviality'. These were Jonson's rules for the group. Written in Latin, they were modelled on Horace and Martial. Translations were reprinted throughout the following century.

== See also ==
- Jacobean era
