= The Death of Dido =

Painting by Guercino

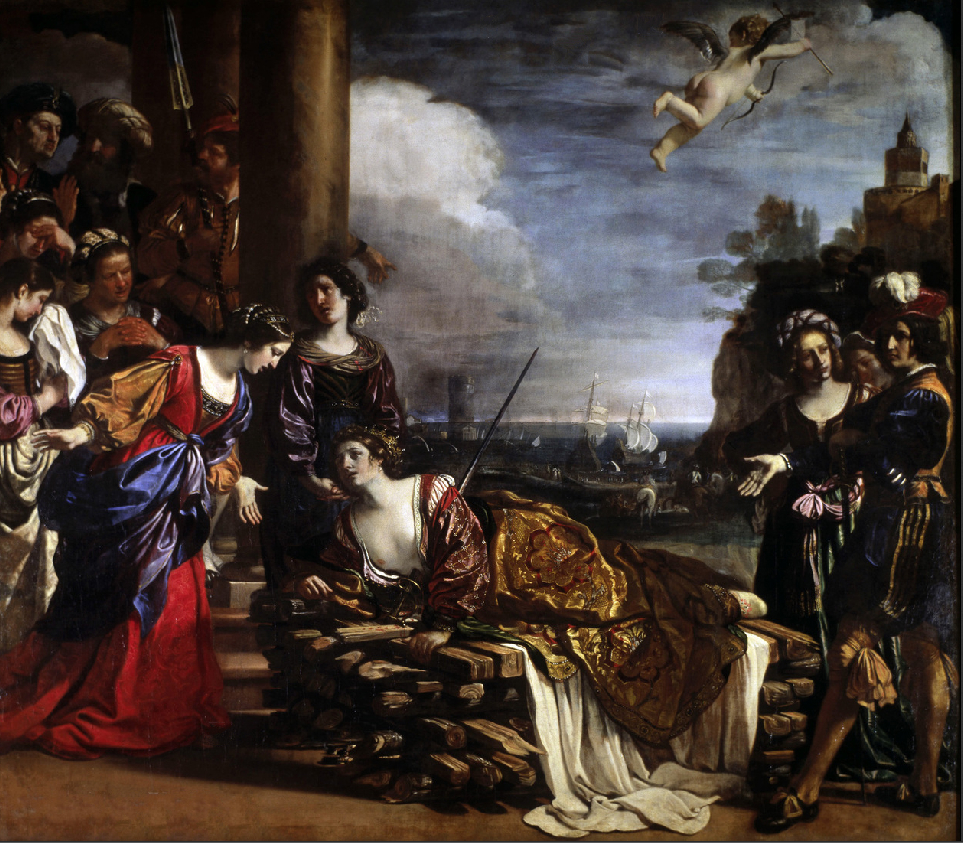
The Death of Dido (1631) by Guercino

The Death of Dido is a 1631 oil-on-canvas painting by the Italian Baroque painter Guercino, commissioned by Cardinal Bernardino Spada for Maria de' Medici. It now hangs in the Galleria Spada in Rome.

== History ==
Whilst Spada observed the painting of Guido Reni's The Abduction of Helen in Bologna in 1628–1629, Maria de' Medici made contact with Spada (who had previously been papal legate in France) to get Reni to come to France and paint for her there, particularly hoping he would complete a cycle of paintings on her husband Henry IV of France which Rubens had left unfinished due to the worsening French political crises regarding the queen mother.

However, though he did produce a 1629 Annunciation for her, Reni declined the invitation to France, leading Spada to suggest Guercino to the queen as a replacement. She replied that she did not know the painter (who was then less well-known than Reni) and wanted a display of his talents before she accepted the suggestion. She left the subject for that test piece up to Spada – he chose the death of Dido. However, thanks to Maria de' Medici's definitive fall from grace and exile soon afterwards, that deal and Guercino's proposed trip to Paris both also fell through, with Spada also unable to sell the completed painting, hence its presence in the Palazzo Spada to this day.

== Allegory ==
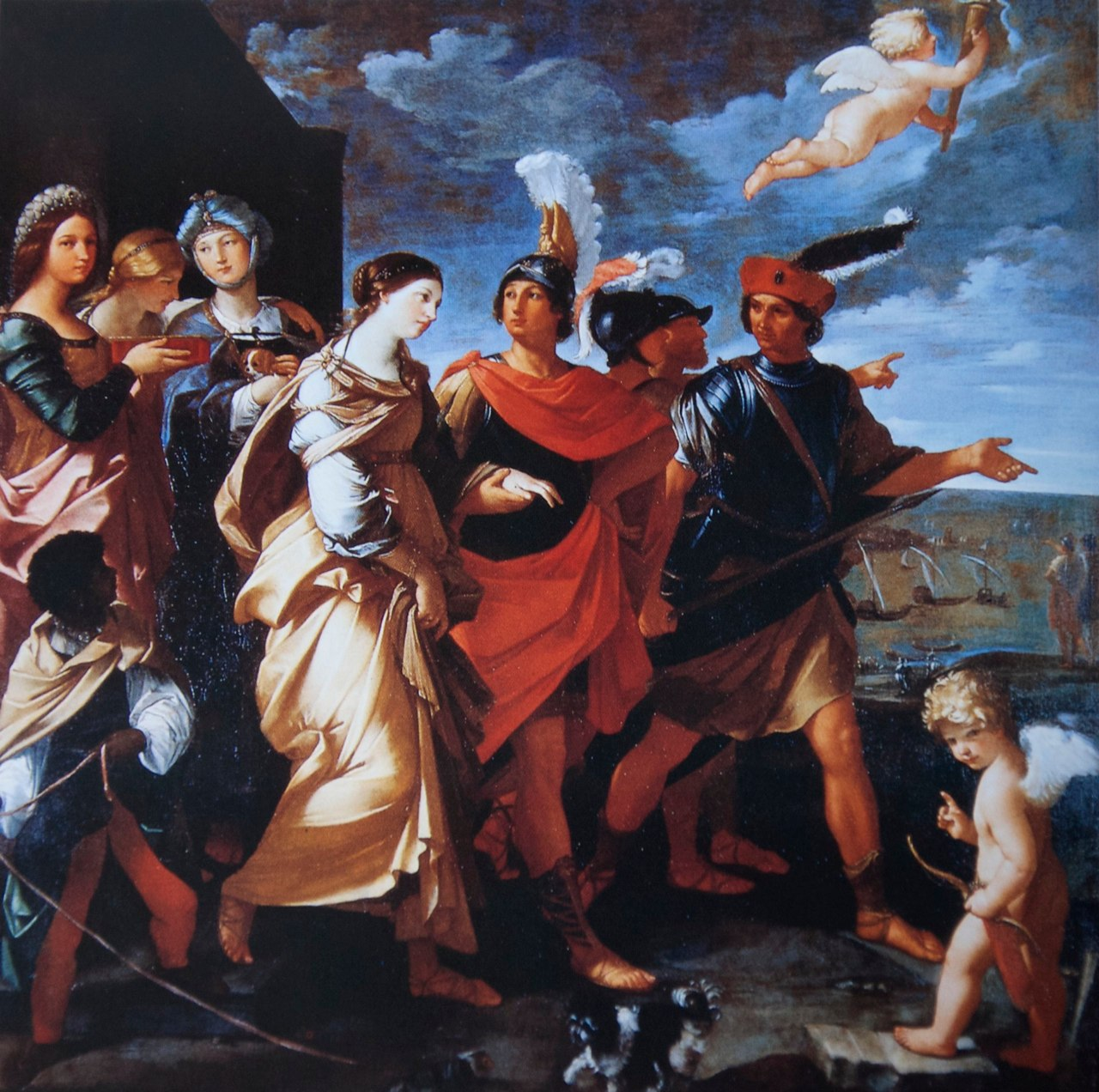
Giacinto Campana (after Guido Reni), Abduction of Helen, c.1631, Galleria Spada, Rome.

Anthony Colantuono and some other art historians argue that Guercino's painting was intended as a pendant to Reni's work, linking their allegories. This would make Abduction a warning to Philip IV, repeated by Urban VIII, about the possible consequences of Spanish expansionism in Italy during the Thirty Years' War, alluding to the Valtellina War and the War of the Mantuan Succession, local conflicts arising from the wider pan-European conflict in Germany and the Netherlands. More specifically, in this interpretation, just as Paris' abduction of Helen caused the Trojan War and the destruction of Paris' fatherland, over-ambitious Spanish aims in Italy could also bring about disaster, making Philip IV not Paris but rather Aeneas, the male figure at the far right pointing towards the sea – Philip was said to be descended both from that mythological character and from Hercules (the pointing figure has an intaglio on his cap showing the Farnese Hercules). This would have made Guercino's work complete Reni's anti-Spanish message, theoretically (had the plan come to fruition) warning Maria de' Medici herself – she was a known appeaser of Madrid, setting her against the policies of her son Louis XIII and his minister Cardinal Richelieu and leading to her downfall, imprisonment in Compiègne and finally to exile. Spada's message from the pope invited her to reflect of the error of trusting in Philip IV's loyalty and that it might lead her into ruin just as Aeneas' betrayal had led to Dido's downfall.

More recent studies have reconsidered the question and come to different conclusions about the two paintings and questioned whether Spada intended to send Maria de' Medici a message. Spada not only ended up keeping Guercino's work but also had a copy made of Reni's work by his pupil Giacinto Campana, which Reni himself then personally re-finished (also still in the Galleria Spada). That copy and Guercino's work were displayed together in a 1632 exhibition at chiesa di Santa Maria di Costantinopoli in Rome, which also included the paintings confiscated from the Sicilian nobleman Fabrizio Valguarnera, who had bought them with the proceeds from a diamond theft, a scandal which was featured in contemporary works by Poussin, Pietro da Cortona and other painters. Some accounts state that the exhibition also included the original version of Reni's Abduction before it was sent to France, though there are doubts on this – the exhibition aimed at selling the works (with Spada's two works this proved unsuccessful) but Reni's Abduction was already spoken for by Maria de' Medici) and those accounts probably confuse Campana's copy with Reni's original.

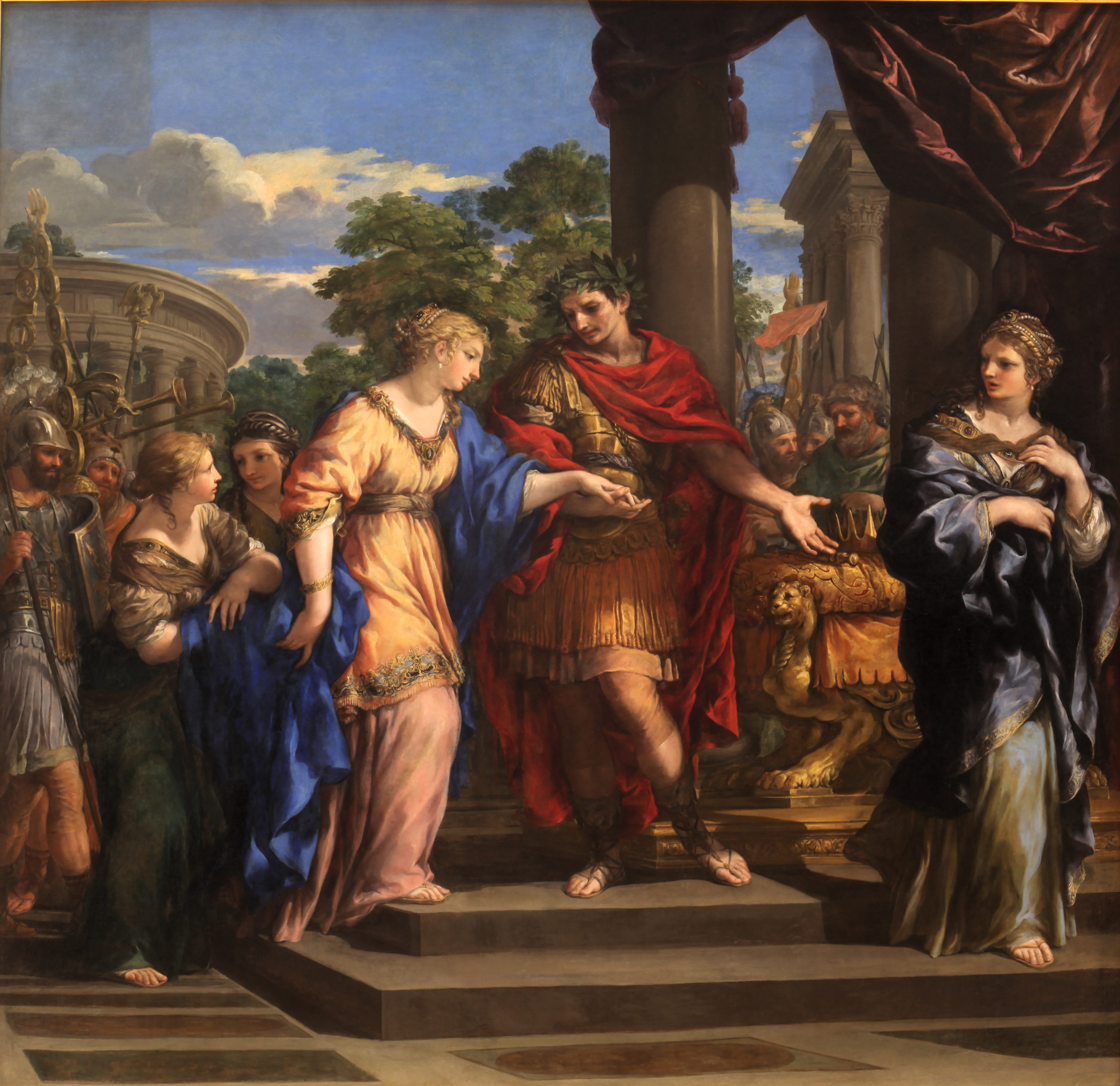
Pietro da Cortona, Caesar Giving Cleopatra the Throne of Egypt, 1637–1643, Musée des beaux-arts (Lyon).

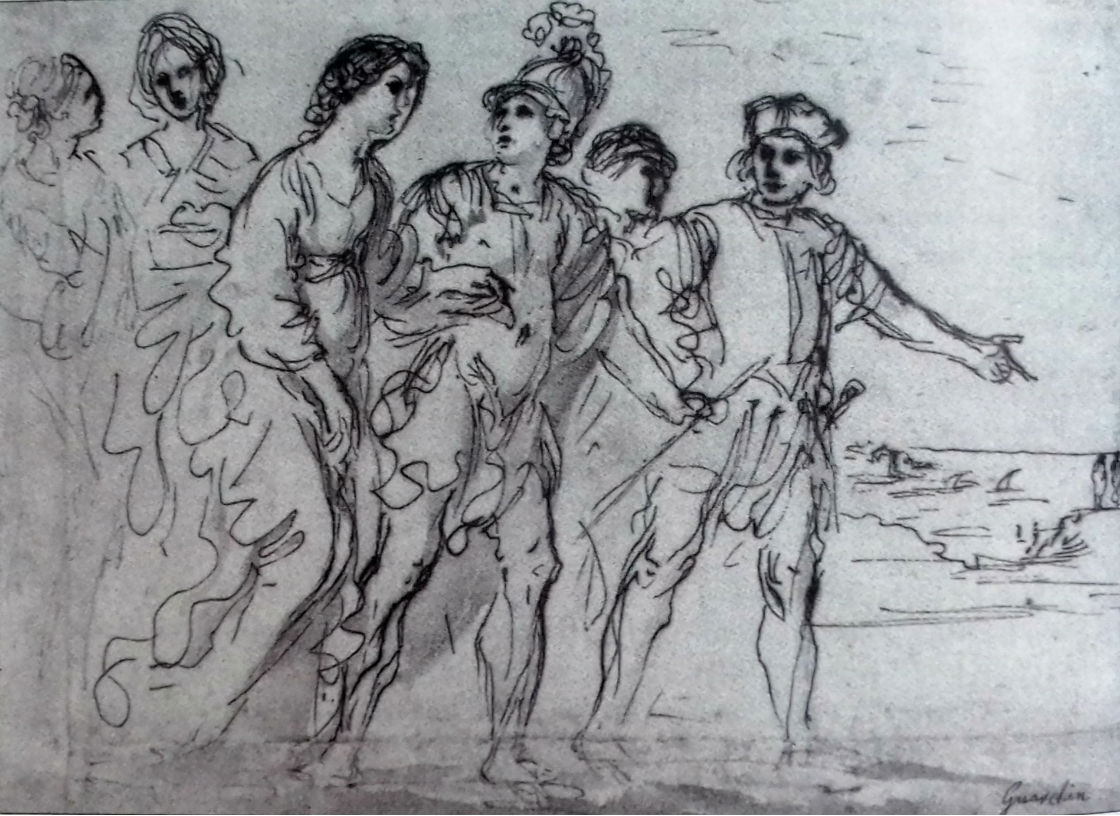
Guercino, Study of 'Abduction of Helen' by Guido Reni, c.1630, Staatliche Graphische Sammlung, Munich

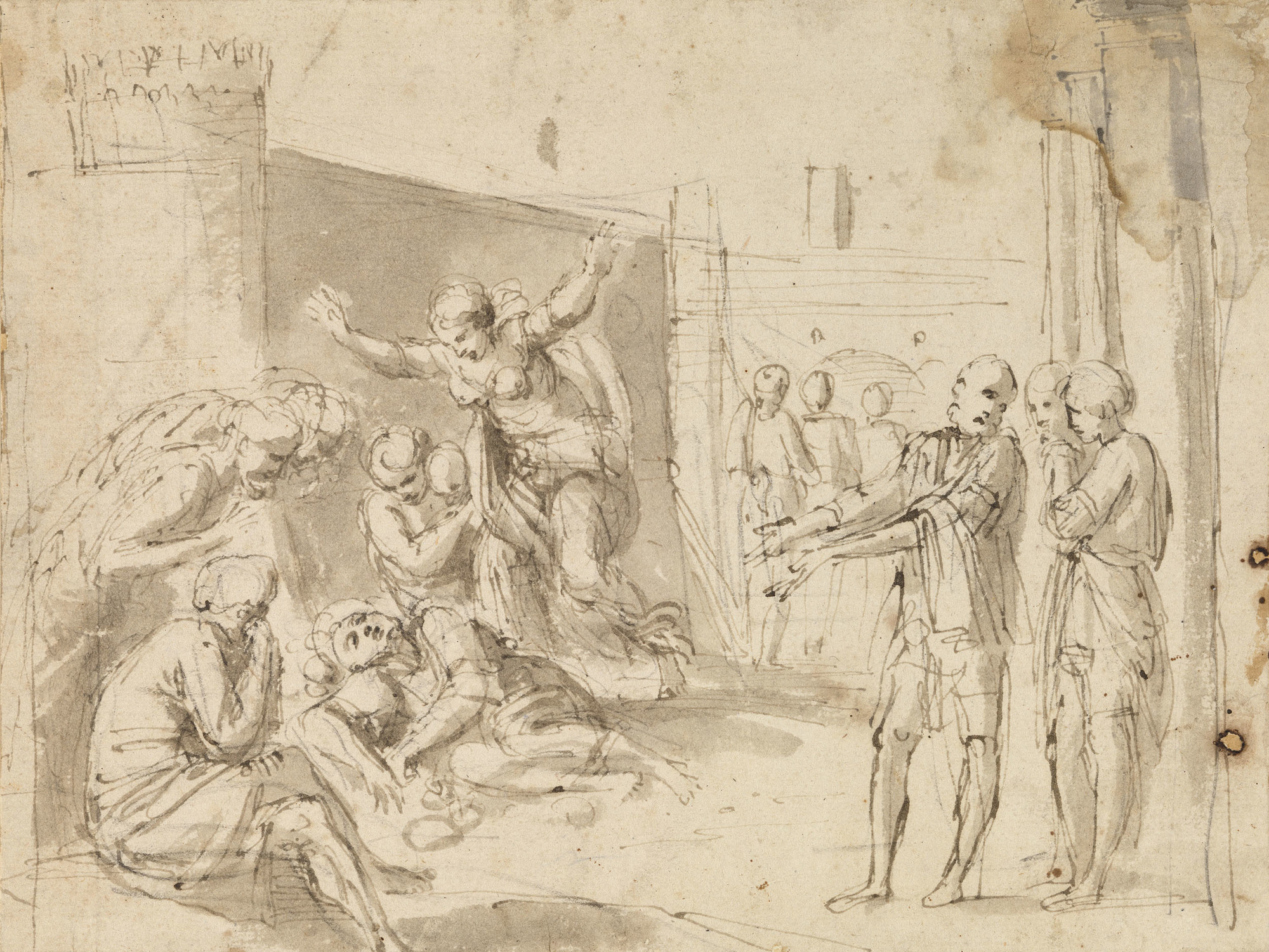
The drawing by Annibale Carracci

According to this alternative account, the idea that both the original and copy of Abduction and Guercino's work were pendants to each other and sending messages to Maria de' Medici only originated later, probably after her death in 1642. and Spada's choice of the death of Dido did not have any deeper meaning or allusion but was simply a motif fashionable at the time (in Bologna alone Annibale Carracci was already painting a work on the subject in Palazzo Zambeccari and students of his school another in Palazzo Fava). At most, it was a motif featuring a queen chosen for a work for a queen. In this scheme Helen – carried far from Sparta – alluded to Maria's exile, whilst Dido's suicide referred to Maria's fall and (after 1642) to her death.

Further proof of this transformation (or rather assumption) of significance may be found in the new pendant painted for Reni's original Abduction. When the latter work reached France but could not be collected by Maria, it was instead taken on by marquess Louis Phélypeaux de La Vrillière, who put it in his now-lost gallery in Paris and commissioned a pendant by Pietro da Cortona showing Caesar Giving Cleopatra the Throne of Egypt. That work shows a deposed queen placed back upon her throne, not as a polemic against Louis and Richelieu but as a prediction of national unity, hoping for a similar rehabilitation for Maria who – for better or worse – had been a major figure in recent French history.

== Description and style ==
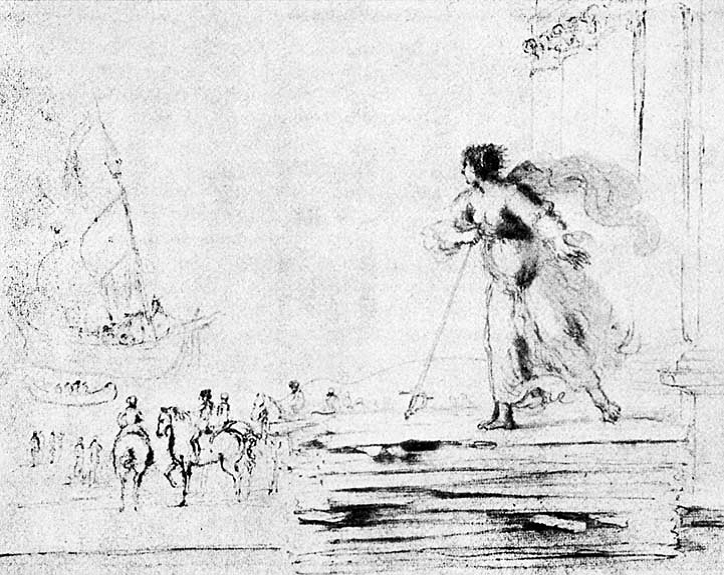
Guercino, Study for the Death of Dido, c.1630, Mahon Collection, London

Whether or not Guercino's work was a formal pendant to Reni's Abduction, it was certainly influenced by it. The first of two preparatory drawings for it, in the former collection of Denis Mahon, shows Guercino's first idea, very different from his final one, with Dido standing on the funeral pyre about to stab herself with Aeneas' sword, with the Trojans standing ready to embark in the background This leads to the theory that when Guercino learned how closely his work was to be shown with Reni's Abduction he heavily modified his treatment to make the two works more congruent, as shown in the second of his preparatory sketches (Staatliche Graphische Sammlung in Munich), which carefully studied Reni's work to create a horizontal multi-figure composition in the foreground, place the marine background in the right and add a putto above (all features of Reni's Abduction). Even so, others point out that there are even clearer similarities than those between Abduction and Dido, namely between Dido and a study by Annibale Carracci for a Martyrdom of Saint Stephen, particularly in the disposition of the bystanders in both.

Guercino chooses the moment of tragedy in the account in Aeneid Book IV where Dido's sister Anna (in red and blue to the left) returns from Aeneas with his final refusal to stay. As yet unaware of Dido's intent to kill herself, Anna turns to her sister and completes the drama with her realisation that Dido has already thrust Aeneas' sword through herself, leaning down to lament with Dido. This is framed by the two groups of Carthagininan soldiers and maidservants to left and right, with Cupid's wings at top right all in black.

The bystanders acting as a chorus, the dramatic dialogue between the sisters and the pathos of the overall work all suggest Guercino is alluding to a play or opera about the queen's tragic death. That impression is underlined by the uninvolved man on the far right who looks towards the viewer, seemingly in the role of the festaiuolo or reveller in Renaissance theatre, a character who stood in a scene without being involved in it and acted as a 'trait d'union' or point of contact between actors and audience.
