= Peter Hausted =

English writer (c. 1605 – 1644)

Peter Hausted (c. 1605 – 20 July 1644), Doctor of Divinity, was an English playwright, poet, and preacher. In his own time, he was notorious as a flamboyant preacher against Puritan and sectarian dissent in the Church of England. He was remembered for the riot that accompanied the 1632 debut of his play The Rival Friends.

== Beginnings ==
Hausted was born at Oundle, in Northamptonshire. He earned an M.A. at Queens' College, Cambridge, and pursued a career in the Church of England. For a time he was the curate at Uppingham in Rutland. Hausted participated in college theatricals as an actor; he was in the cast of the 1631 Cambridge production of Fucus Histriomastix, probably written by Queens' College's Robert Ward.

== Controversies ==
The scandal over The Rival Friends involved a visit by Charles I and Queen Henrietta Maria to Cambridge and the University in March 1632. As part of the entertainment, the University scheduled a performance of Hausted's The Rival Friends, a seven-hour-long play filled with anti-Puritan and anti-sectarian satire. In preparation for the event, the University authorities issued an edict, warning the student body not to indulge in "...any rude or immodest exclamations...nor any humming, hawking, whistling, hissing, or laughing...or any stamping or knocking, nor any such uncivil or unscholarlike or boyish behavior...." And above all, "no tobacco."

The performance that ensued (and curiously, John Milton might have been in the audience) was a theatrical disaster, a near riot in the faces of the King and Queen. Reacting to the disgrace, the University's vice-chancellor Henry Butts committed suicide by hanging himself on Easter Sunday, which was also April Fool's Day.

When The Rival Friends was published later in the year, the title page stated that the play was "Cried down by boys, faction, envy, and confident ignorance, approv'd by the judicious, and now exposed to the public censure, by the author," which gives a taste of Hausted's style.

Hausted's troubles were not confined to the single incident of the 1632 riot. In 1634 he was attacked by a mob at the University church for preaching too wildly against the Puritans.

== Other works ==
In addition to The Rival Friends, Hausted was the author of the Latin play Senile Odium, performed at the University in 1631 and printed in 1633. As a playwright, Hausted has been classed among the Sons of Ben, the followers of the comedic style of Ben Jonson. Like Jonson, Hausted has been noted for his indulgence in "self-praise and invective."

He was also a minor poet and translator; his translation of Raphael Thorius's Hymnus Tabaci, or "Hymn to Tobacco," was published posthumously in 1651 ("Tobacco, King of Plants I well may call, / Others have single virtues, this hath all").

Hausted was a colleague of Thomas Randolph, another "Son of Ben" from Trinity College, Cambridge — though the two were "rival friends" for a time, their conflict rooted in the controversy around Hausted's play. Randolph's The Jealous Lovers had been performed on the same day as The Rival Friends, and had been as great a success as Hausted's had been a failure. Eventually the two patched up their quarrel; Hausted wrote his colleague's epitaph after Randolph's death in 1635.

A Satyre Against Separatists, printed in 1642, has sometimes been attributed to Hausted, but is generally acknowledged to have been written by Abraham Cowley.

== Post mortem ==
Hausted died on 20 July 1644, during the siege of Banbury Castle in the English Civil War. Early critics like Edmund Gosse reported that he died in combat, "shot on the ramparts;" more recent research indicates that he probably died of plague.
