= Giacinto Campana =

Italian painter

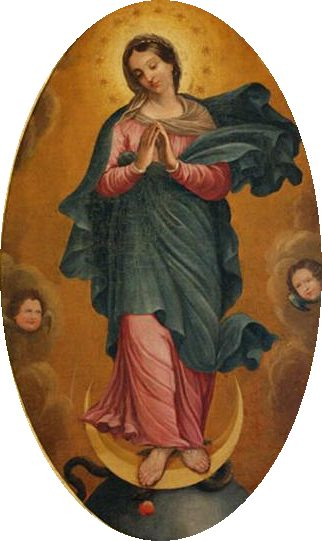
Immaculate Conception of the Blessed Virgin Mary

Giacinto Campana (born c. 1600, Bologna) was an Italian painter of the Baroque period.

He trained first with Francesco Brizio, then with Francesco Albani. He moved to Poland to paint for King Władysław IV Vasa, and died in Poland.

== Sources ==
- Boni, Filippo de' (1852). Biografia degli artisti ovvero dizionario della vita e delle opere dei pittori, degli scultori, degli intagliatori, dei tipografi e dei musici di ogni nazione che fiorirono da'tempi più remoti sino á nostri giorni. Seconda Edizione.. Venice; Googlebooks: Presso Andrea Santini e Figlio. p. 174.
