= The Abduction of Helen (Reni) =

Painting by Guido Reni

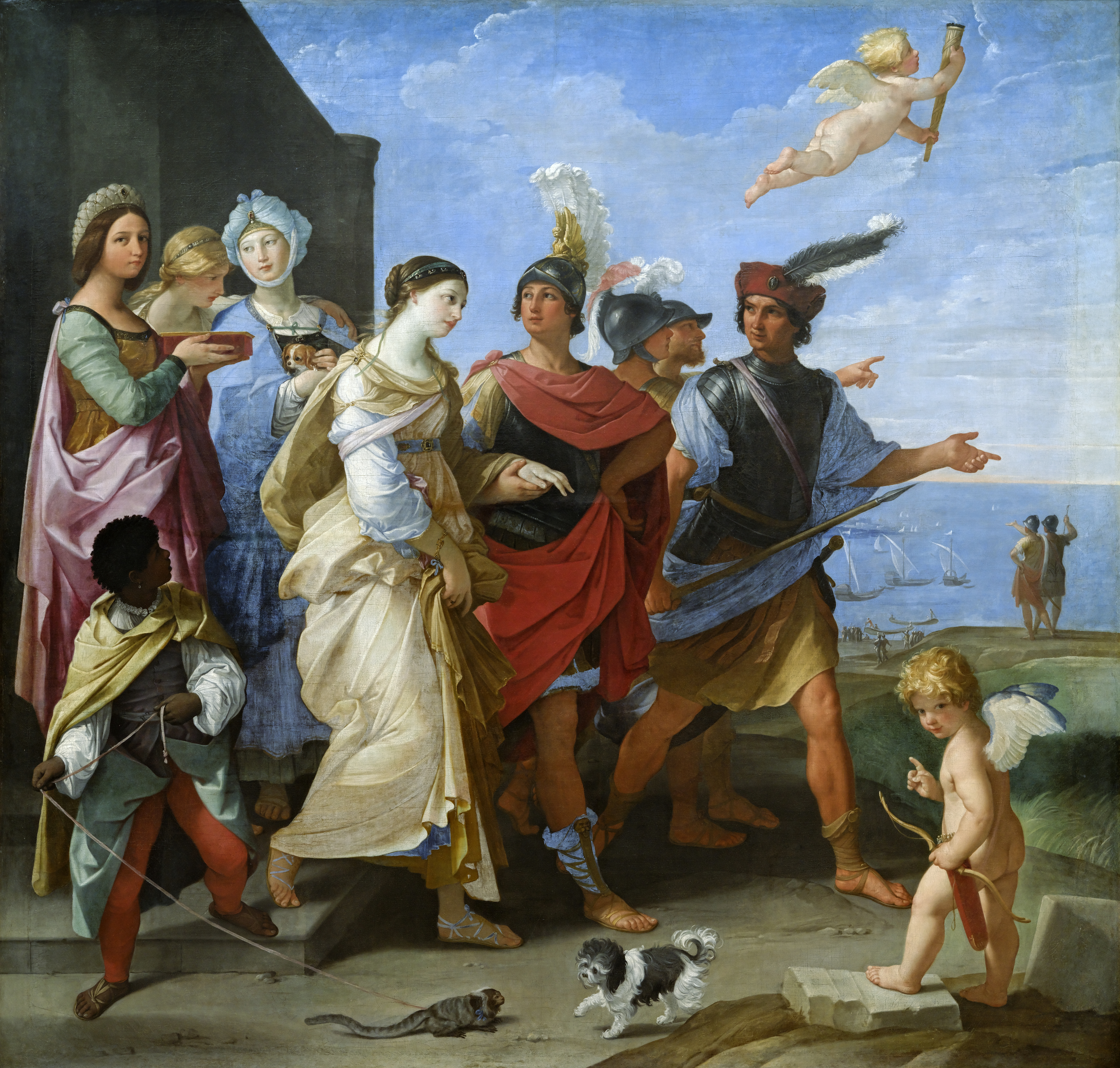
Reni, Rape of Helen, 1628-1629, Louvre, Paris

The Abduction of Helen is a 1628-1629 oil on canvas painting by Guido Reni, now in the Louvre Museum in Paris.

== History ==
In 1627, via his ambassadors in Italy, Philip IV of Spain had ordered from Guido Reni a large canvas showing the rape of Helen of Troy. Like Reni, Cardinal Bernardino Spada was then in Bologna, in his case as papal legate. This allowed him to follow the commission personally, especially since Philip's rank gave it political implications of interest to the papal court. Some art historians suggest that - in this Thirty Years War context - the pro-French Pope Urban VIII even used the work to send a message to his arch-enemy on the Spanish throne. Some have argued that it and Guercino's The Death of Dido were part of a joint allegory directed at Philip IV and Maria by the papal court.

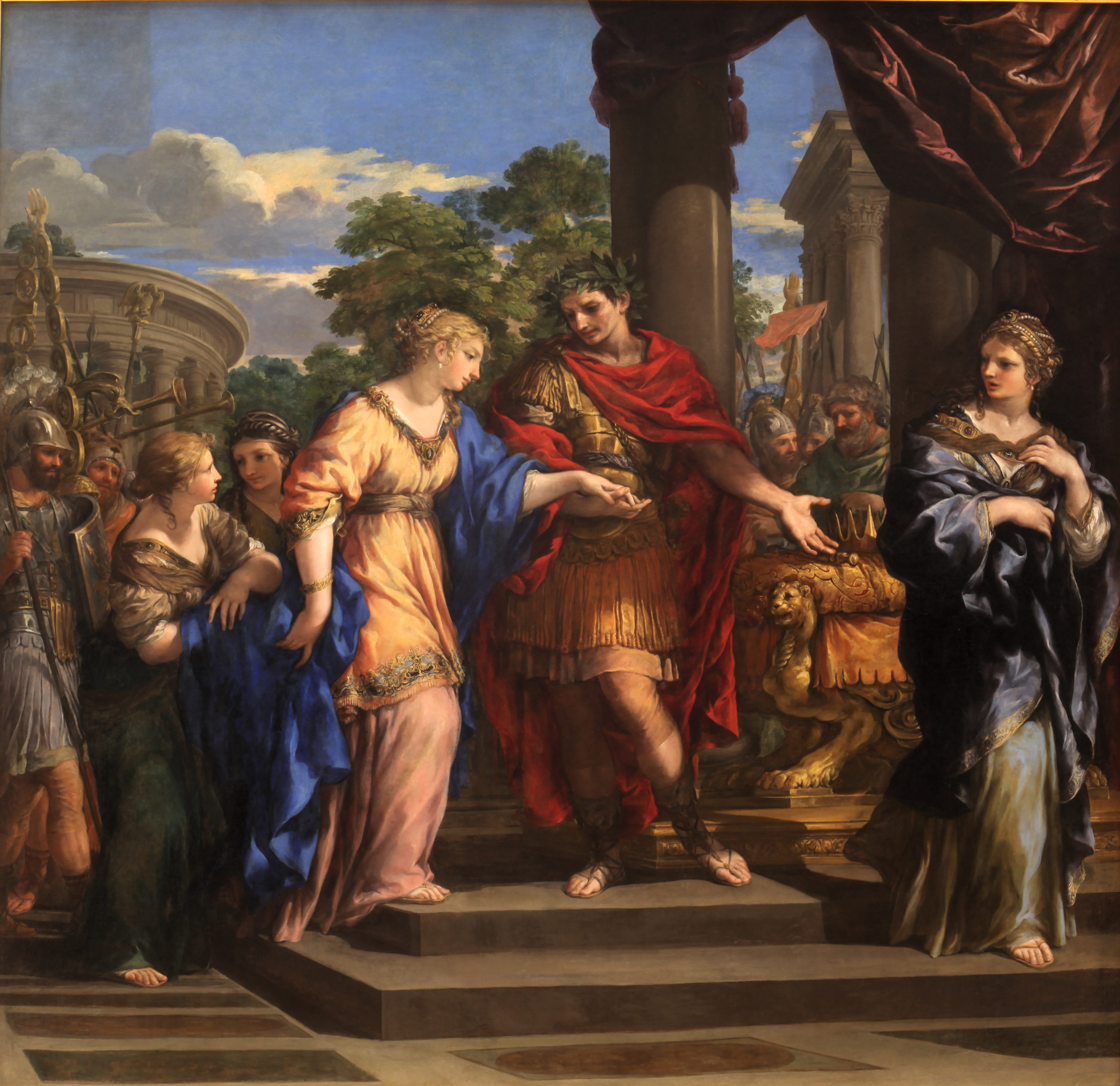
Pietro da Cortona, Caesar Giving Cleopatra the Throne of Egypt, 1637-1643, Musée des beaux-arts (Lyon).

After its completion Reni and the Spanish ambassadors fell out over his payment and the painting went unsold, with Spada taking the opportunity to suggest Maria de' Medici buy it instead. She accepted the suggestion and it thus set off for France. When Abduction reached France but could not be collected by Maria (who had in the meantime fallen from power), it was instead acquired in or before 1654 by Marquess Louis Phélypeaux de La Vrillière, who put it in his now-lost gallery in Paris and commissioned a pendant for it by Pietro da Cortona with the title Caesar Giving Cleopatra the Throne of Egypt. It appeared in a posthumous inventory of his estate and was sold off by his grandson Louis III de La Vrillière (1672-1725) to Louis Raulin Rouillé, controller-general of the posts, whose widow in turn sold it in 1713 to Louis-Alexandre de Bourbon, comte de Toulouse (1678-1737), Louis XIV and Madame de Montespan's legitimised son. It was inherited by the comte's son Louis de Bourbon, duc de Penthièvre (1725-1793) in 1737 and seized upon the French Revolution along with the rest of his collection. Taken to the Louvre, it was first exhibited in the Musée Central des Arts in 1801 and was placed in the château de Maisons-Laffitte for safety during the First World War.
