= Cavalier song =

Jacobean and Carolinian genre of song

Cavalier song is a Jacobean and Carolinian genre of song, a later equivalent to Elizabethan lute song. Many of the surviving examples were part of a large scale lavish court entertainment, the Stuart Masque. The genre is not as widely heard as the lute song, partly due to modern sources for the songs, such as large Musica Britannica volumes being impractical for playing and singing from If playing from the original notation the lute or keyboard player needs to be able to perform from unfigured bass. The period has been neglected by musicologists for some years, because when the songs are played through on the piano they lack substance, and their true worth only emerges through a communicative performance. However, some songs such as Henry Lawes's The Lark, William Lawes' Gather ye Rosebuds, various songs by Thomas Brewer and Nicholas Lanier's The Marigold have found their way into singing anthologies.

Much of this repertoire was recorded and performed by the Consort of Musicke under Antony Rooley.
