= The Broken Heart =

1633 tragedy play by John Ford

The Broken Heart is a Caroline era tragedy written by John Ford, and first published in 1633. "The play has long vied with 'Tis Pity She's a Whore as Ford's greatest work...the supreme reach of his genius...." The date of the play's authorship is uncertain, and is generally placed in the 1625–32 period by scholars. The title page of the first edition states that the play was acted by the King's Men at the Blackfriars Theatre. The text is preceded by the motto "Fide Honor," an anagram for "John Forde," which Ford employs in other of his plays as well. The volume was dedicated to William Lord Craven, Baron of Hampsteed-Marshall.

== Synopsis ==
Set in Classical Greece, the play recounts the story of Amyclas, King of Laconia (or Sparta), his daughter Calantha, and their court. The young Spartan general Ithocles, motivated by pride, interferes with his sister Penthea's intended marriage to Orgilus. Ithocles demands that she marry a greater nobleman, Bassanes. Bassanes proves to be a tyrannical husband, irrational and jealous, who keeps his wife a prisoner. Orgilus pretends a journey to Athens but secretly remains in Sparta in disguise. Ithocles, victorious in battle, recognizes that he has wronged Penthea and Orgilus, and supports a planned marriage between his friend Prophilus and Orgilus's sister Euphrania. Ithocles himself seeks the hand of Calantha, the King's daughter - and she accepts him, instead of her cousin Nearchos, a prince of Argos.

The unhappy Penthea starves herself to death; Orgilus traps Ithocles in a mechanical chair and murders him, just before his planned wedding to Calantha. In the closing scene, Calantha dances at a prenuptial banquet, and keeps dancing as she is informed of the deaths of her father the King, her friend Penthea, and her fiance Ithocles. The dance ended, Calantha, now Queen of Sparta, condemns Orgilus for his murder of Ithocles, appoints Nearchos her heir and successor, and dies of a broken heart.

== Modern productions ==
The Broken Heart remained in obscurity for centuries until it was staged by Laurence Olivier for the first modern production of the play at the Chichester Festival Theatre in 1962. That staging used designs by Roger Furse and music by John Addison. The cast included Olivier in the roles of the Prologue and Bassanes, Keith Michell as Ithocles, Rosemary Harris as Penthea, Joan Greenwood as Calantha, John Neville as Orgilus, André Morell as Amyclas, Alan Howard as Nearchos, Robin Phillips as Prophilus, Polly Adams as Christella, and Gene Anderson as Euphrania.

In 2015 the play was mounted at the Shakespeare's Globe's Sam Wanamaker Playhouse with Owen Teale as Bassanes, Luke Thompson as Ithocles, Amy Morgan as Penthea, Sarah MacRae as Calantha, Brian Ferguson as Orgilus, Patrick Godfrey as Amyclus, Tom Stuart as Prophilus, Joe Jameson as Nearchus, Adam Lawrence as both Phulas and Amelus, and Thalissa Teixeira as Euphrania. The production was directed by Caroline Steinbeis.
