= Oberon, the Faery Prince =

Play written by Ben Jonson

Oberon, the Faery Prince was a masque written by Ben Jonson, with costumes, sets and stage effects designed by Inigo Jones, and music by Alfonso Ferrabosco and Robert Johnson. Oberon saw the introduction to English Renaissance theatre of scenic techniques that became standard for dramatic productions through the coming centuries.

The text of the masque was first published in the initial folio collection of Jonson's works that appeared in 1616.

== The show ==
Oberon was performed on 1 January 1611 at Whitehall Palace, in the Banqueting Hall. Henry Frederick, Prince of Wales, the son and then-heir of James I, took the title role. (Prince Henry had wanted to stage the masque on horseback, but "his father vetoed the Idea.")

The masque was the sixth in the series of extravagant shows that Jonson and Jones produced for the Stuart Court in the Christmas holiday season, a series that had begun with The Masque of Blackness in 1605 and had continued through the previous year's Prince Henry's Barriers (The Lady of the Lake). In Oberon, Jones delivered another installment of the spectacle that the English Court had come to expect. The masque began with a front curtain displaying a map of the British Isles, which was drawn to reveal a large rock or crag, lit by a moon that passed through the sky above. Perched on the crag, surrounded by satyrs and nymphs, an unusually sober and sagelike Silenus prophesied the arrival of the fairy prince, Oberon, who would bestow order and beneficent rule. The nymphs and satyrs danced joyfully at the news.

The crag split open to display a palatial hall, furnished with a throne lit with multi-colored lights. The "Knights Masquers" were revealed, and the Prince of Wales entered, riding in a chariot drawn by two "white bears." (Two polar bears captured in the Arctic in 1609 were kept by Philip Henslowe and Edward Alleyn as part of their bear-baiting operation at the Beargarden, and may have been tame enough in 1611 to use in the staging of Oberon.) The men wore black masks and costumes of silver and gold. The praises of Henry and James were sung by a boys' choir accompanied by ten lutenists, and ten pages in green and silver danced, followed by the dance of the fourteen principal masquers; then Oberon/Henry led his mother Anne of Denmark in the general dancing that concluded the performance.

The masque was coupled with a performance at "barriers," a stylised physical combat (like a joust without horses); but no specific information on that part of the festivity has survived. Apart from that lack, however, the extant documentation on this masque is richer than for many others of the era—which has allowed scholars to study specific aspects of its creation, notably its music.

== Scenery ==
The masque saw Jones's introduction of two techniques of scenery construction to English stagecraft. "Sidewings" are pieces of painted canvas that stand along the sides of the stage, resembling partial backdrops; they can be deployed in multiple pairs arranged for perspective effects. "Shutters" are painted backcloths split down the center, that can be slid in or out from the wings. Shutters, like sidewings, can be deployed in multiple sets; their use allows varied changes of scenic backdrop. (Such scenery was used in masques during the Stuart era; considerations of cost and practicality generally kept scenery out of the professional theatre of Shakespeare and his successors until the Restoration period.)

== Costs ==
Surviving financial records regarding Oberon indicate that the costumes alone cost £1412. The Exchequer accounts show that Jonson and Jones earned their standard fees of £40 each, though Jones received an additional £16 from Prince Henry's household budget; Ferrabosco earned £20 for his music.

== Influences ==
It has been widely recognized that Shakespeare's The Winter's Tale shows the influence of Oberon, necessitating the conclusion that the play was written or at least completed after the January 1611 performance of the masque. The main signs of influence in Shakespeare's play are the bear in III, iii and the dance at the sheepshearing in IV, iv, which resembles the dance of satyrs in the masque. Oberon presents a significant demonstration of the influence that the masques of the era had on the commercial theatre of Shakespeare and his compatriots; "the bears in Mucedorus, Oberon, and The Winter's Tale were all connected...." Thomas Arne and George Colman the Elder also used the work as the basis for their masque The Fairy Prince, which premiered at the Royal Opera House, Covent Garden on 12 November 1771.

== Modern production ==
An extremely rare modern production of Oberon, the Faery Prince was staged in Cleveland, Ohio in 1993, organized by personnel from Case Western Reserve University and Cleveland State University. The production, based on surviving stage designs and music, supplemented with adaptations of Jacobean songs and choreography, was recorded and released on videotape and DVD. Case Western Reserve University also uploaded the video of the production to YouTube in 2020.

== See also ==
- Orgel, Stephen, ed. Ben Jonson: Complete Masques. New Haven, Yale University Press, 1969.
