= Thomas Randolph (poet) =

English poet and dramatist (1605–1635)

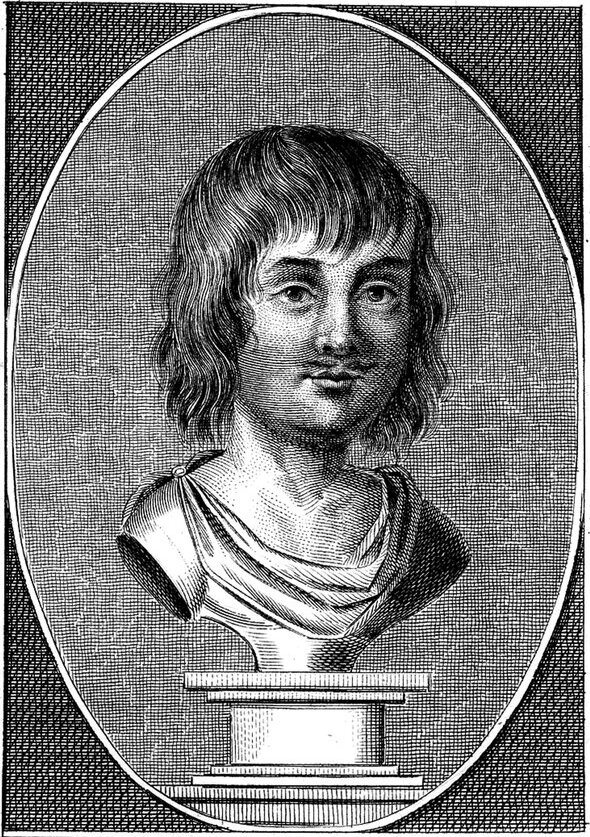
Likeness engraved after the title page of the 2nd edition of Poems

Thomas Randolph (bapt. 15 June 1605 – March 1635) was an English poet and dramatist, recognised by his mentor Ben Jonson as being a promising writer of comedy, and amongst his contemporaries had a reputation as a wit.

== Early life and family ==
Thomas was born at Newnham, Northamptonshire, near Daventry, England, eldest son of William Randolph (1572–1660) and Elizabeth, daughter of Thomas Smith, of Newnham. He was baptized on 18 June 1605. (Note: A few sources list 15 June as his baptismal, not birth, date. However, the majority have it as listed.) William and Elizabeth had two other sons and a daughter. Around 1613 his mother died, shortly after giving birth to Randolph's sister. His father remarried about 1615 to Dorothy, the widow of Thomas West of Cotton End, and daughter of gentleman Richard Lane, of Courteenhall. Her brother was the barrister Richard Lane. William and Dorothy were married two years after the family moved to a house in Little Houghton where his father was steward to Lord Zouche. They had three daughters and four sons. Thomas's half-brother Henry (1623-1673) emigrated to Colonial Virginia, becoming ancestor of the Randolph family of Virginia. He was the uncle of American colonist William Randolph.

== Education ==
Randolph was admitted in 1618 as a King's Scholar to the College of St. Peter, better known as Westminster School, and then Trinity College, Cambridge in 1624 at the age of 18. He was awarded his Bachelor of Arts degree in 1628, promoted to Master of Arts in 1631, and became a major fellow of his college in the same year.

Prior to official publication, Randolph wrote several pieces before entering Westminster, including several epitaphs for people close to the family, the first written when he was 16 in the year 1621. While at Cambridge, he contributed what was probably his first official literary contribution: a poem that was included in a collection celebrating the marriage of King Charles to Princess Henrietta Maria. Around 1626, Thomas' first dramatic production was produced at Cambridge: Aristippus or The Jovial Philosopher. He also revived the tradition of Saltings at Cambridge and his Salting is one of the few that have survived to our day. The revival was repeated the following year by a student one year below Randolph: John Milton. Randolph continued writing throughout his educational career.

== Career ==
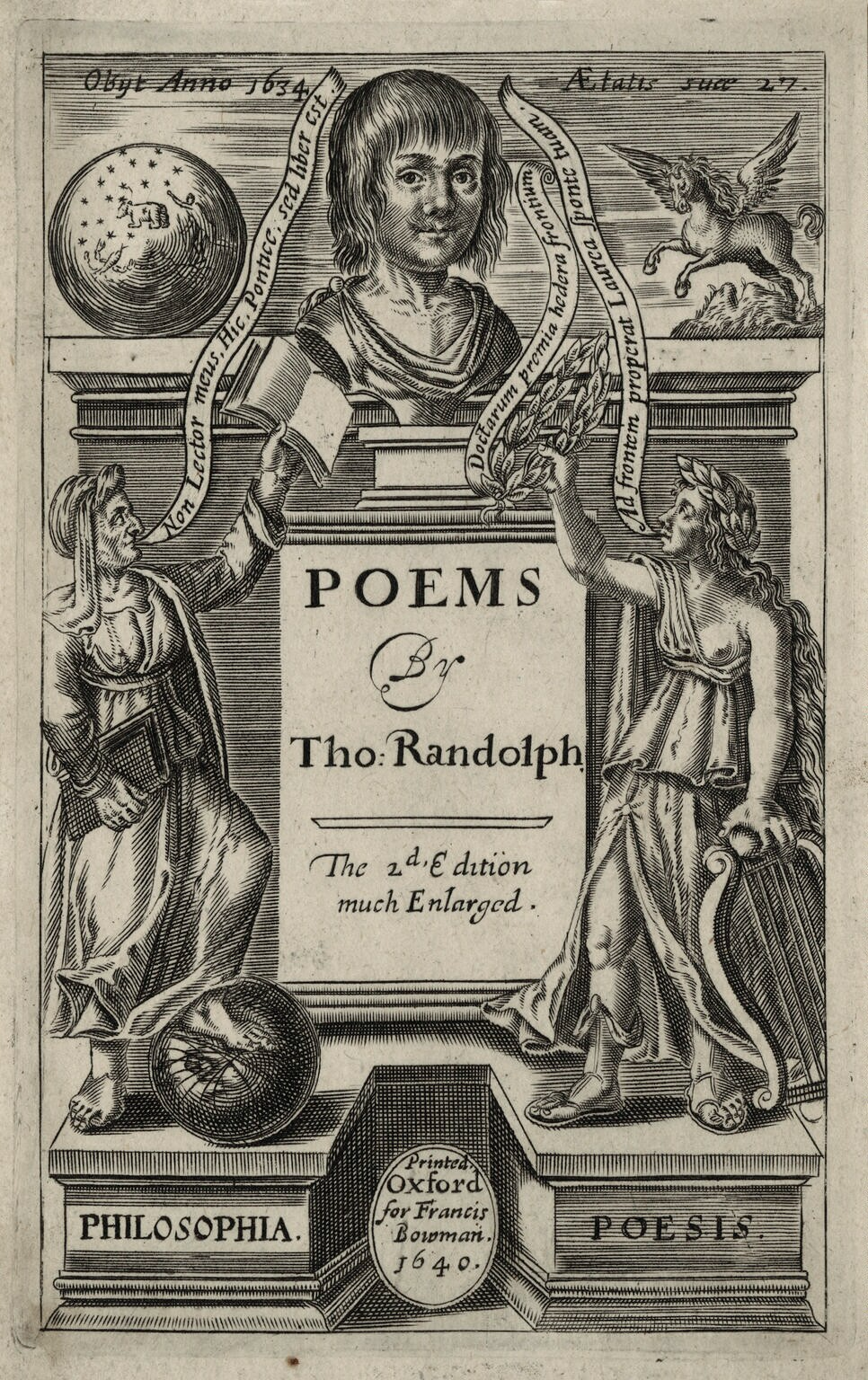
Engraved title page of the 2nd edition of Poems

He soon gave promise as a writer of comedy. Ben Jonson, not an easily satisfied critic, adopted him as one of his "sons." He addressed three poems to Jonson, one on the occasion of Thomas's formal "adoption" as a Son of Ben, another on the failure of Jonson's The New Inn, and the third an eclogue, describing Thomas's own studies at Cambridge. Randolph was one of the most popular playwrights of his time and was expected to become Poet Laureate after Jonson. It was his untimely death at age 29, two years before Jonson's death, that prevented this. After Cambridge, Randolph lived with his father at Little Houghton, Northamptonshire for some time, and afterwards with William Stafford of Blatherwycke Hall, where he died aged 29. He was buried in Blatherwycke church on 17 March 1635 and his epitaph was written by Peter Hausted, the author of The Rival Friends, on his monument, commissioned by Christopher Hatton, 1st Baron Hatton.

Randolph's reputation as a wit is attested by the verses addressed to him by his contemporaries and by the stories attached to his name. His earliest printed work is Aristippus, Or, The Joviall Philosopher. Presented in a private shew, To which is added, The Conceited Pedlar (1630). (Note: These are two separate works: Aristippus, or, The Joviall Philosopher, written circa 1626 and The Conceited Pedlar written in 1627. In 1630, they were published together as one book.) It is a gay interlude burlesquing a lecture in philosophy, the whole piece being an argument to support the claims of sack against small beer. The Conceited Pedlar is an amusing monologue delivered by the pedlar, who defines himself as an "individuum vagum, or the primum mobile of tradesmen, a walking-burse or movable exchange, a Socratical citizen of the vast universe, or a peripatetical journeyman, that, like another Atlas, carries his heavenly shop on shoulders." He then proceeds to display his wares with a running satirical comment.

The drama, The Jealous Lovers, was presented by the students of Trinity College, Cambridge, before the king and queen in 1632. The Muse's Looking-Glass is hardly a drama. Roscius presents the extremes of virtue and vice in pairs, and last of all the "golden mediocrity" who announces herself as the mother of all the virtues. Amyntas, or The Impossible Dowry, a pastoral printed in 1638, with a number of miscellaneous Latin and English poems, completes the list of Randolph's authenticated work. Hey for Honesty, down with Knavery, a comedy, is doubtfully assigned to him. Randolph has been proposed as the author of the anonymous manuscript play, The Fairy Knight, though the attribution has not won much approval from critics.

His works were edited by W. C. Hazlitt in 1875.
