= Cristóbal de Mesa =

Spanish poet and writer

Cristóbal de Mesa (15 October 1556 in Fregenal de la Sierra – 27 September 1633 in Madrid) was a Spanish Mannerist poet and writer. He studied at Salamanca. He befriended poets Fernando de Herrera and Torquato Tasso. In addition to writing epics, he also translated Virgil.

== Works ==
Some of his poems and epics are:

- El patrón de España (1612)
- La restauración de España (1607)
- El valle de lágrimas y diversas rimas (1607)
- Las Navas de Tolosa (1594)
