= Johann Philipp Abelin =

German chronicler

Johann Philipp Abelin was a German chronicler whose career straddled the 16th and 17th centuries. He was born, probably, at Strasbourg, and died there between 1634 and 1637. He wrote numerous histories under the pseudonyms of Abeleus, Philipp Arlanibäus and Gotofredus.

== Publications ==
He worked mainly as a translator for the publishing house of Lucas Jennisius, Matthäus Merian and Friedrich Hulsius in Frankfurt. Some of his works, such as a history of India, proved later to be translations of other works. His own works consisted mainly of compilations of historical records.

=== Own works ===
Abelin produced compilations of contemporary records and letters about the events of the wars of Gustavus Adolphus of Sweden without further historical commentary:

- Arma Suecica, 1631–1634, in 12 parts
- Inventarium Sueciae, 1632

In the same style, his best known work was Theatrum Europaeum, a series of chronicles of the chief events in the history of the world down to 1619, reedited, updated and republished several times, including a translation into Dutch. Its coincidence with the needs and tastes of the time, made it a very popular work. Abelin was responsible for the first two volumes. It was continued by various writers and grew to 21 volumes (1633–1738). However, the main interest of the volumes are the beautiful copperplate engraved illustrations of Matthäus Merian (1593–1650).

=== Derivative works ===
- Historia Antipodum, 1655, a translation of a history of the West Indies
- Archontologia Cosmicum, translation and revision of Petrus d'Avirth's Monde

== Sources ==
- Rochus von Liliencron (1875). "Abelinus, Johann Philipp" . Allgemeine Deutsche Biographie (in German). Vol. 1. Leipzig: Duncker & Humblot. pp. 18–19.
