= Clavis mathematicae =

Mathematics book written by William Oughtred

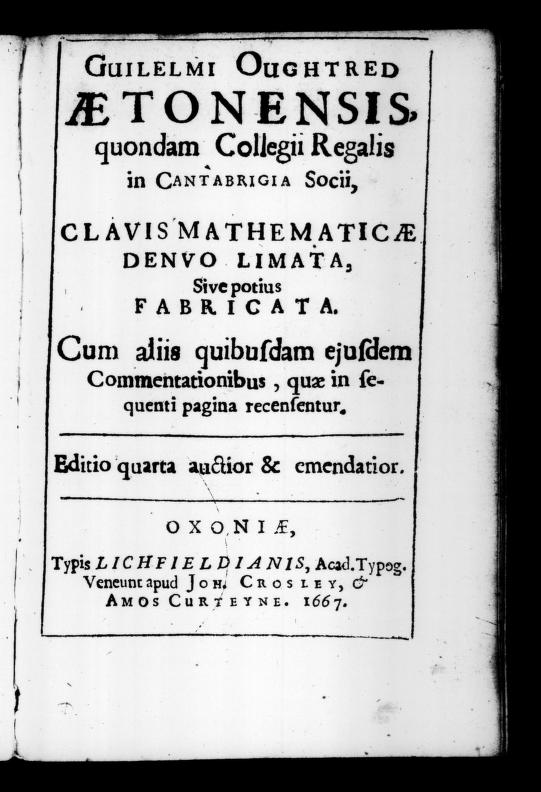
- Author: William Oughtred
- Language: Latin
- Publication date: 1631

Clavis mathematicae (English: The Key of Mathematics) is a mathematics book written by William Oughtred, originally published in 1631 in Latin. It was an attempt to communicate the contemporary mathematical practices, and the European history of mathematics, into a concise and digestible form. The book contains an addition in its 1647 English edition, "Easy Way of Delineating Sun-Dials by Geometry", which had been written by Oughtred earlier in life. The original edition brought the autodidactic Oughtred acclaim amongst mathematicians, but the English-language reissue brought him celebrity, especially amongst tradesman who made use of the arithmetic in their labors. The book is also notable for using the symbol "x" for multiplication, a method invented by Oughtred.
