= The Antiquary (play) =

The Antiquary is a Caroline era stage play, a comedy written by Shackerley Marmion. It was acted in the 1634–36 period by Queen Henrietta's Men at the Cockpit Theatre, and first published in 1641. The Antiquary has been succinctly described as "Marmion's best play."

== Contemporary references ==
The play drew upon several contemporary sources for its inspiration. Antiquarianism and the collection of "rarities" was a growing trend in Marmion's era. Marmion's title character, Veterano, has a habit of staring at a sculpture with a broken nose; this may have been intended as an allusion to Thomas Howard, 21st Earl of Arundel, a famous antiquarian and art collector of the day. Marmion also was influenced by a contemporary controversy: in 1629, King Charles I and his Privy Council developed a scheme to confiscate the collection of the celebrated antiquary Charles Cotton the elder.

== Synopsis ==
Marmion set his play in Pisa (although, with references to the Rialto and the senate, he seems to have been thinking more about Venice). Like some other rulers in folklore and story (Harun al-Rashid being the most famous example), the Duke of Pisa chooses to go about in disguise among his subjects, to observe them and to amuse himself in the process. He witnesses a variety of odd characters, including Petrutio, who has been made vain and conceited by his foreign travels, and Moccinigo, an old man shocked by a courtesan's rejection into pursuing the hand of the 16-year-old Lucretia.

Veterano is an elderly and wealthy collector of antiquities; he denies his nephew Lionell any financial support and spends his money on his supposed treasures. Gullibly, he believes he owns the net in which Vulcan captured Mars and Venus, and "the great silver box that Nero kept his beard in." Lionell, an "ingenious witty gentleman" and a "young knave," cheats his uncle by selling him bogus rarities in disguise. The Duke, in confederacy with Lionell, threatens to confiscate Veterano's collection, since it is too precious to be in the hands of a private citizen; in response, Veterano wills his estate to Lionell.

Lionell places his boy page with Lucretia's parents, Lorenzo and Aemilia. Aemilia develops an infatuation with the boy; when Lorenzo discovers this, he is outraged. Aemilia manages to turn the tables on her husband with Lionell's help: she reveals that the page is a girl (Lionell's sister Angelia) in disguise, and accuses Lorenzo of sneaking his own mistress into their house. A shocked Lorenzo is forced to yield command of his household to his wife.

In addition to Moccinigo, Lucretia is courted by the ardent Aurelio — but she abuses her would-be lover so severely that she converts him into a misogynist. Yet when she learns that Moccinigo plots Aurelio's murder, Lucretia tries to forestall the crime and set things right; she apologises to Aurelio, and he abandons his misogyny as quickly as he adopted it. Aurelio tricks Lucretia into marrying him by trapping her in appearances: he bribes her servant into granting him entry into her apartments, and emerges the next morning to announce that they are married. To save her honour, Lucretia must marry him in fact. (This plot device is used in other plays of the era, from Lording Barry's Ram Alley, c. 1607, to Thomas Killigrew's The Parson's Wedding, 1641.)

Lionell and the Duke get Veterano drunk; in his inebriated state, Veterano claims that his hat was worn by Julius Caesar, his breeches by Pompey the Great, and his eyeglasses by Hannibal. When he falls asleep, they dress the old man in a fool's coat. Waking to find himself so attired, Veterano goes to the Duke to complain – only to find that the "Duke" is his nephew in disguise.

Moccinigo is tricked and cheated into signing his estates over to the newly married Aurelio and Lucretia. The foolish Petrutio is similarly tricked into marrying Lionell's sister Angelia, a young woman he'd formerly courted but neglected. (He believes he's marrying the Duke's sister – and in a sense he is, since the man he thinks is the Duke is actually Lionell.) The real Duke, emerged from concealment at the play's end, exults in the pleasure he's enjoyed and in the fitness of the outcome.

== After 1642 ==
During the Restoration, Thomas d'Urfey borrowed from Marmion's drama to create his Madame Fickle, or the Witty False One (1677). Veterano reappears in different guises in later plays as well, in Samuel Foote's The Nabob (1773) and in John O'Keeffe's Modern Antiquities (1791).

The Antiquary was also admired by Sir Walter Scott; he included it in his collection Ancient British Drama.
