= Shackerley Marmion =

17th-century English playwright

Shackerley Marmion (January 1603 – 1639), also Shakerley, Shakerly, Schackerley, Marmyon, Marmyun, or Mermion, was an early 17th-century dramatist, often classed among the Sons of Ben, the followers of Ben Jonson who continued his style of comedy. He was also a friend and perhaps a protégé of Thomas Heywood.

== Background ==
The playwright's father, Shackerley Marmion (son of a London lawyer and member of a junior line (Note: Banks identified Shakerley's line to be descended from Geoffrey Marmion the younger brother of Philip Marmion, 5th Baron Marmion of Tamworth and cited the College of Arms as evidence.) of the Marmion Barons of Tamworth), held the manor at Aynho in Northamptonshire but was habitually in debt; in time he would pass his debts on to his son. Shakerley Jnr was baptised on 21 Jan 1603 in Aynho church.

After Lord Williams's School at Thame in Oxfordshire, Marmion graduated from Wadham College, Oxford, with an M.A. in July 1624. (During his years at Oxford, his father Shackerley Marmion was forced to sell his estate an Aynho to pay his debts.) Details of his life after university are unclear, though there are intimations of legal troubles, disorderly affairs, dodging creditors. He fought in the Low Countries during this period, apparently under Sir Sigismund Alexander according to Anthony à Wood, and in 1629 was indicted for assaulting one Edward Moore with his sword and wounding the man's head. He was arrested and released on bail, but did not surrender at the next session; further records of the incident have not been found.

== Plays ==
Marmion's first known play was Holland's Leaguer, produced in 1631 at the Salisbury Court theatre and acted six days in succession, "one of the longest known [runs] in the Elizabethan, Jacobean, or Caroline theatre," though perhaps due more to the meagreness of the repertory of Prince Charles's Men than to the play's unusual popularity. Marmion's second play, A Fine Companion, was staged in 1632 or 1633 and published in the latter year, after being performed by the Prince Charles's Men at Salisbury Court Theatre. The Antiquary (c. 1634–36), his third and last play, was acted by Queen Henrietta's Men at the Cockpit Theatre, and published in 1641.

All comedies, Marmion's plays show the influence of Ben Jonson. Marmion adapted Jonsonian comedy to his own preoccupation with Platonic love. And while he is often classified by critics as a limited talent and a figure of at best secondary importance, his knack with satire has frequently been praised.

== Other works ==
Besides his comedies, Marmion wrote a 2000-line verse epic, Cupid and Psyche (1637), a translation and expansion of the Cupid and Psyche story in Apuleius's The Golden Ass in heroic couplets. He also wrote various minor poems, including an elegy on Jonson, published in 1638, titled "A Funeral Sacrifice, to the Sacred Memory of his Thrice-Honored Father, Ben Jonson." Commendatory verses that he wrote for others, or that others wrote for him, associate Marmion with Heywood, Thomas Nabbes, Richard Brome, and the actor Joseph Taylor.

== Last years ==
In 1638 Marmion joined Sir John Suckling's privately organized military incursion against the Scottish Covenanters; but he fell out along the route due to illness and returned in London, where he died the following year.
