= Masque =

Courtly entertainment with music and dance

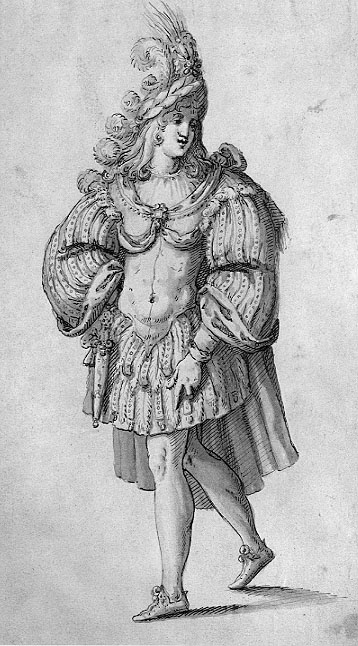
Costume for a Knight, by Inigo Jones: the plumed helmet, the "heroic cuirass" in armour and other conventions were still employed for opera seria in the 18th century.

The masque was a form of festive courtly entertainment that flourished in 16th- and early 17th-century Europe, though it was developed earlier in Italy, in forms including the intermedio (a public version of the masque was the pageant). A masque involved music, dancing, singing and acting, within an elaborate stage design, in which the architectural framing and costumes might be designed by a renowned architect, to present a deferential allegory flattering to the patron. Professional actors and musicians were hired for the speaking and singing parts. Masquers who did not speak or sing were often courtiers: the English queen Anne of Denmark frequently danced with her ladies in masques between 1603 and 1611, and Henry VIII and Charles I of England performed in the masques at their courts. In the tradition of masque, Louis XIV of France danced in ballets at Versailles with music by Jean-Baptiste Lully.

== Development ==
The masque tradition developed from the elaborate pageants and courtly shows of ducal Burgundy in the late Middle Ages. Masques were typically a complimentary offering to the prince among his guests and might combine pastoral settings, mythological fables, and the dramatic elements of ethical debate. There would invariably be some political and social application of the allegory. Such pageants often celebrated a birth, marriage, change of ruler or a royal entry and invariably ended with a tableau of bliss and concord.

Masque imagery tended to be drawn from Classical rather than Christian sources, and the artifice was part of the Grand dance. Masque thus lent itself to Mannerist treatment in the hands of master designers like Giulio Romano or Inigo Jones.

The New Historians, in works like the essays of Bevington and Holbrook's The Politics of the Stuart Court Masque (1998), have pointed out the political subtext of masques. At times, the political subtext was not far to seek: The Triumph of Peace, put on with a large amount of parliament-raised money by Charles I, caused great offence to the Puritans. Catherine de' Medici's court festivals, often even more overtly political, were among the most spectacular entertainments of her day, although the "intermezzi" of the Medici court in Florence could rival them.

=== Dumbshow ===
In English theatre tradition, a dumbshow is a masque-like interlude of silent mime usually with allegorical content that refers to the occasion of a play or its theme, the most famous being the dumbshow played out in Hamlet (III.ii). Dumbshows might be a moving spectacle, like a procession, as in Thomas Kyd's The Spanish Tragedy (1580s), or they might form a pictorial tableau, as one in the Shakespeare collaboration, Pericles, Prince of Tyre (III.i)—a tableau that is immediately explicated at some length by the poet-narrator, Gower.

Dumbshows were a medieval element that continued to be popular in early Elizabethan drama, but by the time Pericles (c. 1607–08) or Hamlet (c. 1600–02) were staged, they were perhaps quaintly old-fashioned: "What means this, my lord?" is Ophelia's reaction. In English masques, purely musical interludes might be accompanied by a dumbshow.

== Origins ==
The masque has its origins in a folk tradition where masked players would unexpectedly call on a nobleman in his hall, dancing and bringing gifts on certain nights of the year, or celebrating dynastic occasions. The rustic presentation of "Pyramus and Thisbe" as a wedding entertainment in Shakespeare's A Midsummer Night's Dream offers a familiar example. Spectators were invited to join in the dancing. At the end, the players would take off their masks to reveal their identities. In 1377, 130 men came "disguisedly apparelled", their faces covered with vizards to entertain Richard II of England.

=== Court masques in England and Scotland ===
In England, Tudor court masques developed from earlier guisings, where a masked allegorical figure would appear and address the assembled company—providing a theme for the occasion—with musical accompaniment. Costumes were designed by professionals, including Niccolo da Modena. Elizabeth of York paid for costumes for "disguysings" in June and December 1502. Minstrels were dressed in white and green Tudor livery. Henry VIII came to Catherine of Aragon's chamber disguised as Robin Hood in January 1510, perhaps causing initial uneasiness, and there was dancing.

Hall's Chronicle explained the new fashion of Italian-style masque at the English court in 1512. The essential feature was the entry of disguised dancers and musicians to a banquet. They would appear in character and perform, and then dance with the guests, and then leave the venue. At the meeting at Lille in October 1513, when the ladies were dancing after a banquet, Henry VIII and eleven other dancers entered "richely appareled with bonettes of gold". At the conclusion of their performance they gave their masque costumes to the audience.

On 1 May 1515, Henry VIII and Catherine of Aragon rode from Greenwich Palace to have breakfast in an arbour constructed in a wood at Shooter's Hill. Catherine and her ladies were dressed in Spanish-style riding gear, Henry was in green velvet. The royal guard appeared in disguise as Robin Hood and his men. There was a pageant chariot or car with Lady May and Lady Flora, followed by a masque and dancing.

According to George Cavendish, in January 1527 Henry VIII came to Cardinal Wolsey's Hampton Court or York Place, by boat "in a masque with a dozen of other maskers all in garments like shepherds made of fine cloth of gold and fine crimson satin paned, and caps of the same with visors", wearing false beards, accompanied with torch bearers and drummers. Their arrival at the palace water gate was announced by cannon fire. The King's part of the entertainment was organised by William Sandys and Henry Guildford. The masquers played a dice game called mumchance before dancing. Edward Hall described similar masques involving the king's disguised appearance.

In the play Henry VIII, by Fletcher and Shakespeare, Wolsey's masques were recalled when Henry in shepherd's disguise meets Anne Boleyn. Anne Boleyn and seven ladies in "maskyng apparel of straunge fashion" performed for Henry VIII and Francis I of France at Calais on 27 October 1532. Some of the costume, supplied by the yeoman of the revels Richard Gibson, was described as "masking gere".

Inventories of masque costume at the court of Henry VIII made when Catherine Howard was queen include lists of "maskyng garmentes" for men and for women. The women's costumes included coifs, partlets, upper garments, kirtles, and a set of "high heads after Dutch fashion of striped lawn".

Masques at Elizabeth I's court emphasized the concord and unity between Queen and Kingdom. A descriptive narrative of a processional masque is the masque of the Seven Deadly Sins in Edmund Spenser's The Faerie Queene (Book i, Canto IV). A particularly elaborate masque, performed over the course of two weeks for Queen Elizabeth, is described in the 1821 novel Kenilworth, by Sir Walter Scott. Queen Elizabeth was entertained at country houses during her progresses with performances like the Harefield Entertainment.

In Scotland, masques were performed at court, particularly at wedding celebrations, and the royal wardrobe provided costumes. At a banquet at the tournament of the Wild Knight and the Black Lady in 1507, the Black Lady came into the hall at Holyroodhouse with Martin the Spaniard who was equipped with an archery bow and dressed in yellow. A cloud descended from the roof and swept them both away.

Performers at a wedding masque at Castle Campbell in 1562 dressed as shepherds. Mary, Queen of Scots, Henry Stuart, Lord Darnley, and David Rizzio took part in a masque in February 1566. Mary attended the wedding of her servant Bastian Pagez, and it was said she wore male costume for the masque, "which apparel she loved often times to be in, in dancings secretly with the King her husband, and going in masks by night through the streets". James VI and Anne of Denmark wore masque costumes to dance at weddings at Alloa Tower and Tullibardine Castle. At Tullibardine, James VI and his valet, probably John Wemyss of Logie, wore taffeta costumes and Venetian masks.

After James and Anne became king and queen of England at the Union of the Crowns in 1603, narrative elements of the masque at their court became more significant. Plots were often on classical or allegorical themes, glorifying the royal or noble sponsor. At the end, the audience would join with the actors in a final dance. Ben Jonson wrote a number of masques with stage design by Inigo Jones. Their works are usually thought of as the most significant in the form. Samuel Daniel and Sir Philip Sidney also wrote masques. The court masque genre frequently introduced encounters with Indigenous peoples of America and new commodities.

William Shakespeare included a masque-like interlude in The Tempest, understood by modern scholars to have been heavily influenced by the masques of Ben Jonson and the stagecraft of Inigo Jones. There is also a masque sequence in his Romeo and Juliet and Henry VIII. John Milton's Comus (with music by Henry Lawes) is described as a masque, though it is generally reckoned a pastoral play.

There is a detailed, humorous, and malicious (and possibly completely fictitious) account by Sir John Harington in 1606 of a masque of Solomon and Sheba at Theobalds. Harington was not so much concerned with the masque itself as with the notoriously heavy drinking at the Court of King James I; "the entertainment went forward, and most of the presenters went backward, or fell down, wine did so occupy their upper chambers". As far as we can ascertain the details of the masque, the Queen of Sheba was to bring gifts to the King, representing Solomon, and was to be followed by the spirits of Faith, Hope, Charity, Victory and Peace. Unfortunately, as Harington reported, the actress playing the Queen tripped over the steps of the throne, sending her gifts flying; Hope and Faith were too drunk to speak a word, while Peace, annoyed at finding her way to the throne blocked, made good use of her symbolic olive branches to slap anyone who was in her way.

Francis Bacon paid for The Masque of Flowers to celebrate the marriage of Robert Carr, 1st Earl of Somerset and Frances Howard, Countess of Somerset. James Hay, 1st Earl of Carlisle, was a performer and sponsor of court masques. He wrote about the tight-fitting costumes, that it was the fashion "to appear very small in the waist, I remember was drawn up from the ground by both hands whilst the tailor with all his strength buttoned on my doublet".

Masques were also performed as private entertainments in country houses. In February 1618, The Coleorton Masque was staged at Coleorton Hall in Leicestershire by Thomas Beaumont. The 14 year old Rachel Fane wrote The May Masque for performance at her parents' mansion Apethorpe in Northamptonshire.

Reconstructions of Stuart masques have been few and far between. Part of the problem is that only texts survive complete; there is no complete music, only fragments, so no authoritative performance can be made without interpretive invention. By the time of the English Restoration in 1660, the masque was passé, but the English semi-opera which developed in the latter part of the 17th century, a form in which John Dryden and Henry Purcell collaborated, borrows some elements from the masque and further elements from the contemporary courtly French opera of Jean-Baptiste Lully.

In the 18th century, masques were even less frequently staged. "Rule, Britannia!" started out as part of Alfred, a masque about Alfred the Great co-written by James Thomson and David Mallet with music by Thomas Arne which was first performed at Cliveden, country house of Frederick, Prince of Wales. Performed to celebrate the third birthday of Frederick's daughter Augusta, it remains among the best-known British patriotic songs up to the present, while the masque of which it was originally part is remembered by only specialist historians.

== Legacy ==
The most outstanding humanists, poets and artists of the day, in the full intensity of their creative powers, devoted themselves to producing masques; and until the Puritans closed the English theatres in 1642, the masque was the highest art form in England. But because of its ephemeral nature, not a lot of documentation related to masques remains, and much of what is said about the production and enjoyment of masques is still part speculation.

== 17th- and 18th-century masques ==
While the masque was no longer as popular as it was at its height in the 17th century, there are many later examples of the masque. During the late 17th century, English semi-operas by composers such as Henry Purcell had masque scenes inset between the acts of the play proper. In the 18th century, William Boyce and Thomas Arne, continued to utilize the masque genre mostly as an occasional piece, and the genre became increasingly associated with patriotic topics. Acis and Galatea (Handel) is another successful example. There are isolated examples throughout the first half of the 19th century.

== Later masques ==
With the renaissance of English musical composition during the late 19th and early 20th century (the so-called English Musical Renaissance), English composers turned to the masque as a way of connecting to a genuinely English musical-dramatic form in their attempts to build a historically informed national musical style for England. Examples include those by Arthur Sullivan, George Macfarren, and even Edward Elgar, whose imperialistic The Crown of India was the central feature at the London Coliseum in 2005. Masques also became common as scenes in operettas and musical theatre works set during the Elizabethan period.

In the 20th century, Ralph Vaughan Williams wrote several masques, including his masterpiece in the genre, Job, a masque for dancing which premiered in 1930, although the work is closer to a ballet than a masque as it was originally understood. His designating it a masque was to indicate that the modern choreography typical when he wrote the piece would not be suitable. Vaughan Williams' protégé Elizabeth Maconchy composed a masque, The Birds (1967–68), an "extravaganza" after Aristophanes.

Constant Lambert also wrote a piece he called a masque, Summer's Last Will and Testament, for orchestra, chorus and baritone. His title he took from Thomas Nashe, whose masque was probably first presented before the Archbishop of Canterbury, perhaps at his London seat, Lambeth Palace, in 1592.

== List of notable masques ==
=== 17th-century masques ===
- Chloridia
- Christmas, His Masque
- Comus (John Milton)
- Cupid and Death
- The Fairy-Queen
- The Fortunate Isles and Their Union
- The Golden Age Restored
- The Gypsies Metamorphosed
- The Hue and Cry After Cupid
- Hymenaei
- The Lady of May
- Lord Hay's Masque
- The Lords' Masque
- The King's Entertainment at Welbeck
- London's Love to Prince Henry
- Love Freed from Ignorance and Folly
- Love Restored
- Love's Triumph Through Callipolis
- Love's Welcome at Bolsover
- Luminalia
- Mercury Vindicated from the Alchemists
- Neptune's Triumph for the Return of Albion
- Oberon, the Faery Prince
- Pleasure Reconciled to Virtue
- Salmacida Spolia
- Tempe Restored
- Tethys' Festival
- The Masque of Augurs
- The Masque of Beauty
- The Masque of Blackness
- The Masque of the Inner Temple and Gray's Inn
- The Masque of Queens
- The Memorable Masque of the Middle Temple and Lincoln's Inn
- The Shepherd's Paradise
- The Sun's Darling
- The Triumph of Beauty
- The Triumph of Peace
- The Vision of Delight
- The Vision of the Twelve Goddesses
- The World Tossed at Tennis
- Time Vindicated to Himself and to His Honours

=== 18th-century masques ===
- Albion; or, The Court of Neptune
- Albion Restor'd
- Alfred
- Apollo and Daphne
- Beauty and Virtue
- Britannia
- Britannia and Batavia
- Calypso; a masque
- The Comick Masque of Pyramus and Thisbe
- Comus
- The Death of Dido
- The Druids, a masque
- The Fairy Favour
- The Fairy Festival
- The Fairy Prince
- The Festival
- The Genius of Ireland version 1
- The Genius of Ireland version 2
- The Happy Nuptials
- The Judgement of Hercules
- The Judgement of Paris
- Love and Glory
- The Masque of Hymen
- The Masque of Neptune's Prophecy
- The Masque of Orpheus and Euridice
- The Masque of Solon
- The Nuptials
- The Nuptial Masque
- Pan and Syrinx
- Peleus and Thetis: A Masque
- Presumptuous Love: A Dramatick Masque
- Shakespeare's Jubilee, a Masque
- The Statute, a Pastoral Masque
- The Syrens, a masque
- The Triumph of Peace
- Telemachus
- The Triumphs of Hibernia
- Venus and Adonis
