= Basil Spence =

Scottish architect (1907–1976)

Sir Basil Spence
- Born: Basil Urwin Spence; 13 August 1907; Bombay, Bombay Presidency, British India
- Died: 19 November 1976 (aged 69); Yaxley, Suffolk, England, UK
- Education: Edinburgh College of Art
- Occupation: Architect
- Practice: Basil Spence & Partners
- Buildings: Coventry Cathedral; Hyde Park Barracks; New Zealand parliament extension

Sir Basil Urwin Spence, OM OBE RA (13 August 1907 – 19 November 1976) was a Scottish architect, most notably associated with Coventry Cathedral in England and the Beehive in New Zealand, but also responsible for numerous other buildings in the Modernist/Brutalist style.

== Training ==
Spence was born in Bombay, Bombay Presidency, British India, the son of Urwin Archibald Spence, an assayer with the Royal Mint. He was educated at the John Connon School, operated by the Bombay Scottish Education Society, and was then sent back to Scotland to attend George Watson's College in Edinburgh from 1919 to 1925. He enrolled at Edinburgh College of Art (ECA) in 1925, studying architecture, where he secured a maintenance scholarship on the strength of the "unusual brilliance" of his work. He won several prizes at the college, and meanwhile carried out paid work drawing architectural perspectives for practising architects including Leslie Grahame Thomson, Reginald Fairlie and Frank Mears.

In 1929–1930, he spent a year as an assistant, along with William Kininmonth, in the London office of Sir Edwin Lutyens, whose work was to have a profound influence on Spence's style, where he worked on designs for the Viceroy's House in New Delhi, India. While in London he attended evening classes at the Bartlett School of Architecture under A. E. Richardson. Returning to ECA in 1930 for his final year of studies, he was appointed a junior lecturer, despite the fact that he was still a student. He continued to teach at ECA until 1939.

== Early career ==
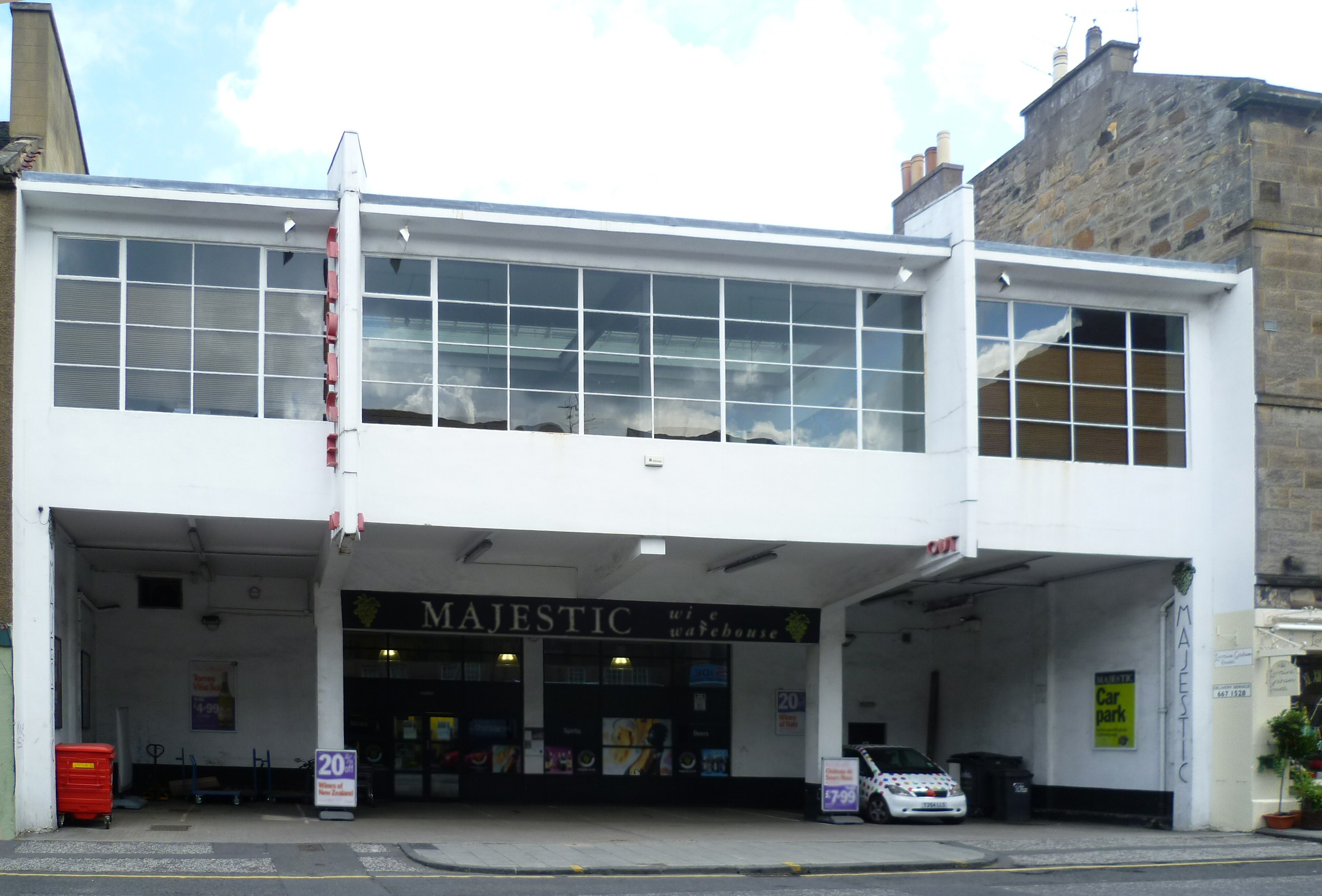
Southside Garage in the art deco style

After graduating in 1931, Kininmonth and Spence set up in practice together, based in a room within the office of Rowand Anderson & Paul (at that time having Arthur Forman Balfour Paul as sole partner), in Rutland Square, Edinburgh. The practice was founded on two residential commissions which Kininmonth had obtained that year. Spence also received commissions to illustrate other architects' work, including the Southside Garage, on Causewayside, Edinburgh, in an Art Deco style (although credited to Spence his name appears nowhere on the official warrant drawings and only appears as a signature on the artist's perspective).

In 1934 Spence married, and the Kininmonth & Spence practice merged with Rowand Anderson & Paul. Balfour Paul died in 1938, leaving Kininmonth and Spence in charge of the renamed Rowand Anderson & Paul & Partners. Spence's work was now concentrated on exhibition design, including three pavilions for the 1938 Empire Exhibition in Glasgow, and country houses.

The first two of these, Broughton Place at Broughton near Biggar, and Quothquan in Lanarkshire, were executed in traditional Scottish styles at the client's request. The third was entirely modern. Gribloch was designed for John Colville, grandson of the founder of Colville's Iron Works, and his American wife. It was designed in a modernist Regency style, with assistance from Perry Duncan, an American architect hired by the Colvilles when Spence was too busy with exhibition work to progress the project.

== Army service ==
In 1939, Spence was commissioned as a second lieutenant into the Camouflage Training and Development Centre of the British Army. He was initially based at Farnham in Surrey. His work included, prior to D-Day, the design of a counterfeit oil terminus at Dover as part of the Operation Fortitude deception plan for the Normandy landings. Spence subsequently took part in the D-Day landings in 1944. He was demobilised in September 1945, having reached the rank of major and been mentioned in despatches twice.

== Postwar career ==
Spence returned to Rowand Anderson & Paul & Partners briefly, before setting up his own practice, Basil Spence & Partners, with Bruce Robertson. He was awarded an OBE in 1948 for his work in exhibition design, work which he continued with the Sea and Ships Pavilion for the 1951 Festival of Britain. That year he opened a London office, moving there permanently from 1953. A second office was opened in 1956 at Canonbury, which became the creative hub of the practice. Spence was External Professor of Architecture at the University of Leeds from 1955 to 1957 and from 1958 to 1960 he was the President of the Royal Institute of British Architects.

Basil Spence & Partners were responsible for the redevelopment and extension of the University of Glasgow's Kelvin Building, which houses its School of Physics and Astronomy. The project was carried out in three phases. The first, 1947–1952, added a new lecture theatre and housed a synchrotron. Teaching laboratories and another lecture theatre were added in the second phase, which was finished in 1959. A third phase was completed in 1966 and included a museum to showcase Lord Kelvin's old experimental apparatus. Some of this is still on display in the Kelvin Building today, with other items having been moved to form part of an exhibit at the Hunterian Museum and Art Gallery.

=== Coventry Cathedral ===
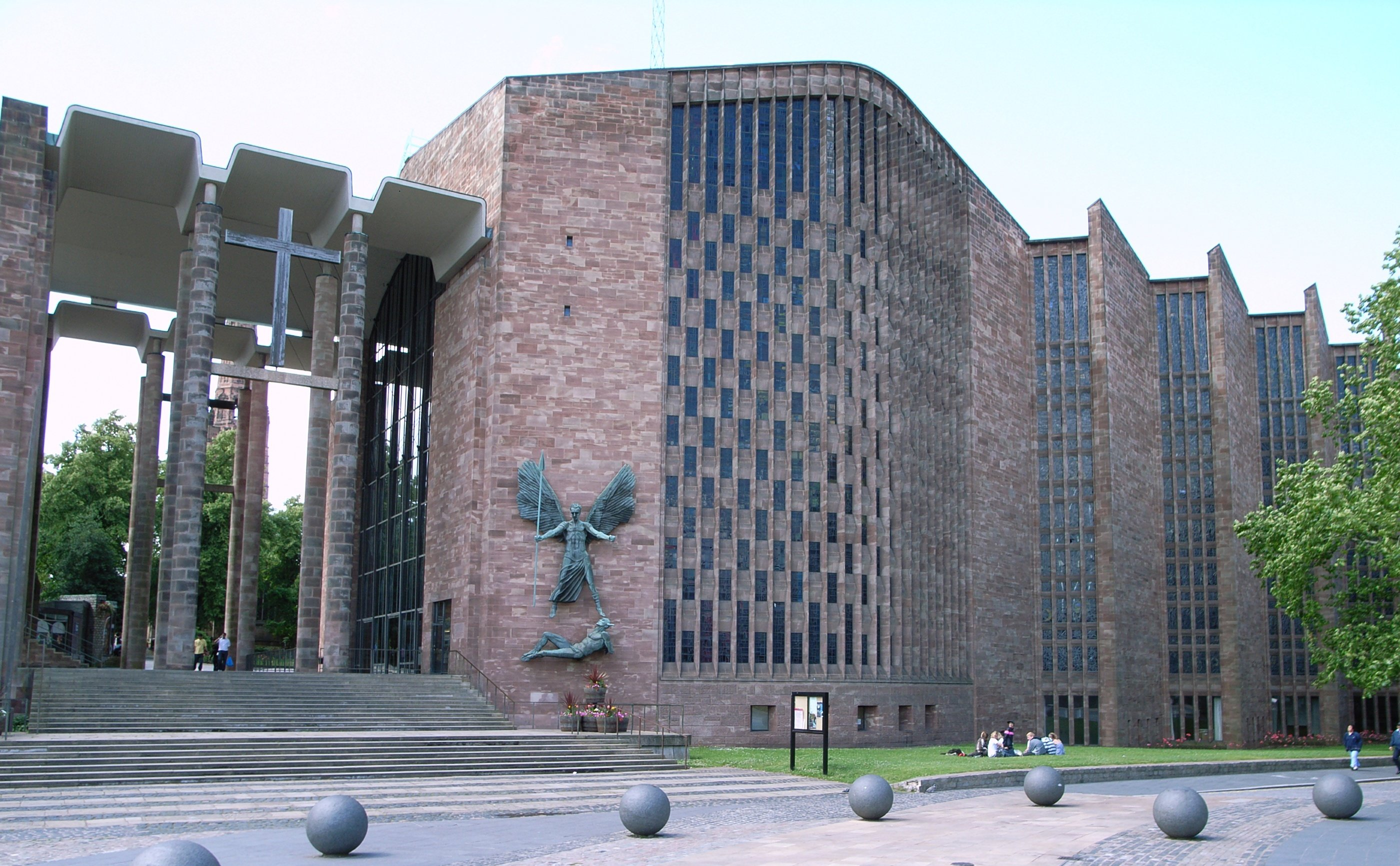
Coventry Cathedral (1956–1962)

On 14 November 1940, Coventry's Anglican Cathedral was extensively damaged by German bombing, a year into World War II.

In 1944, Sir Giles Gilbert Scott submitted a design proposal to rebuild the cathedral but this was rejected by the Royal Fine Arts Commission. In 1950, a competition was launched to find the most suitable design from a Commonwealth of Nations architect. Over 200 entries were received, and Spence's radical design was chosen. Work began in 1956 and the structure was completed in 1962. Spence was knighted in 1960 for his work at Coventry, while the cathedral was still being built.

On 23 February 2012 the Royal Mail released a stamp featuring Coventry Cathedral as part of its "Britons of Distinction" series.

=== Later work ===
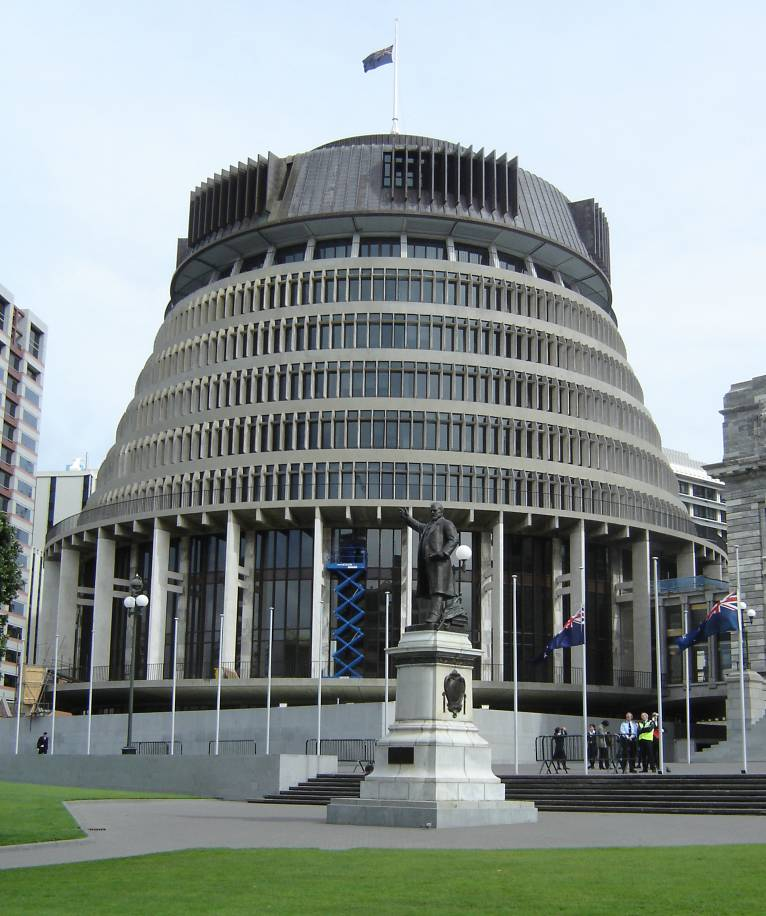
The New Zealand Parliament's executive wing, the Beehive

In 1959, Spence secured two important commissions, for the British Embassy in Rome (completed 1971), and for the Hyde Park Cavalry Barracks in London (completed 1970). He designed the high-rise Hutchesontown C social housing in Glasgow. These replaced notorious slum tenements in the Gorbals area of the city. A dense concentration of social deprivation in the area, coupled to poor execution meant these developments developed many problems, and they were demolished by explosives in 1993, with the accidental loss of one life.

Spence was responsible for contextual modernist buildings on The Canongate in Edinburgh, near the new Scottish Parliament and in view of Holyrood Palace, named Canongate Flats and listed in 2008. Other work in the 1960s included the concept design for the executive wing of the New Zealand Parliament Buildings in Wellington, nicknamed "The Beehive", and Abbotsinch Airport (now Glasgow Airport).

In 1960, Spence designed Mortonhall Crematorium in Edinburgh's Braid Hills area (based on the same angled fin concept as found at Coventry Cathedral). He provided architectural treatments for the elevations of Trawsfynydd nuclear power station, inaugurated in Snowdonia, north Wales, in 1968.

Also in 1964, with support from the Nuffield Foundation, the University of Southampton built a theatre on its campus. Spence worked closely with Sir Richard Southern as consultant for the interior design and layout of the theatre.

The Spence practice was rearranged in 1964, with the Canonbury office being renamed Sir Basil Spence OM RA, and the second London office Spence Bonnington & Collins. The Edinburgh office was also renamed for its partners, Spence Glover & Ferguson. From 1961 to 1968, Spence was Professor of Architecture at the Royal Academy.

Through the 1970s, Spence continued to work on public and private commissions, universities and offices including Aston University Library and Management Centre. His last work was for an unexecuted cultural centre for Bahrain, which he worked on during illness in 1976. Some of his final commissions were built after his death; for example, his design for the new Glasgow Royal Infirmary was completed in 1981.

Spence died in November 1976 at his home at Yaxley, Suffolk and was buried at nearby Thornham Parva.

His practice, Spence, Ferguson and Glover, continued until 1992 when it was disbanded.

== Assessment ==
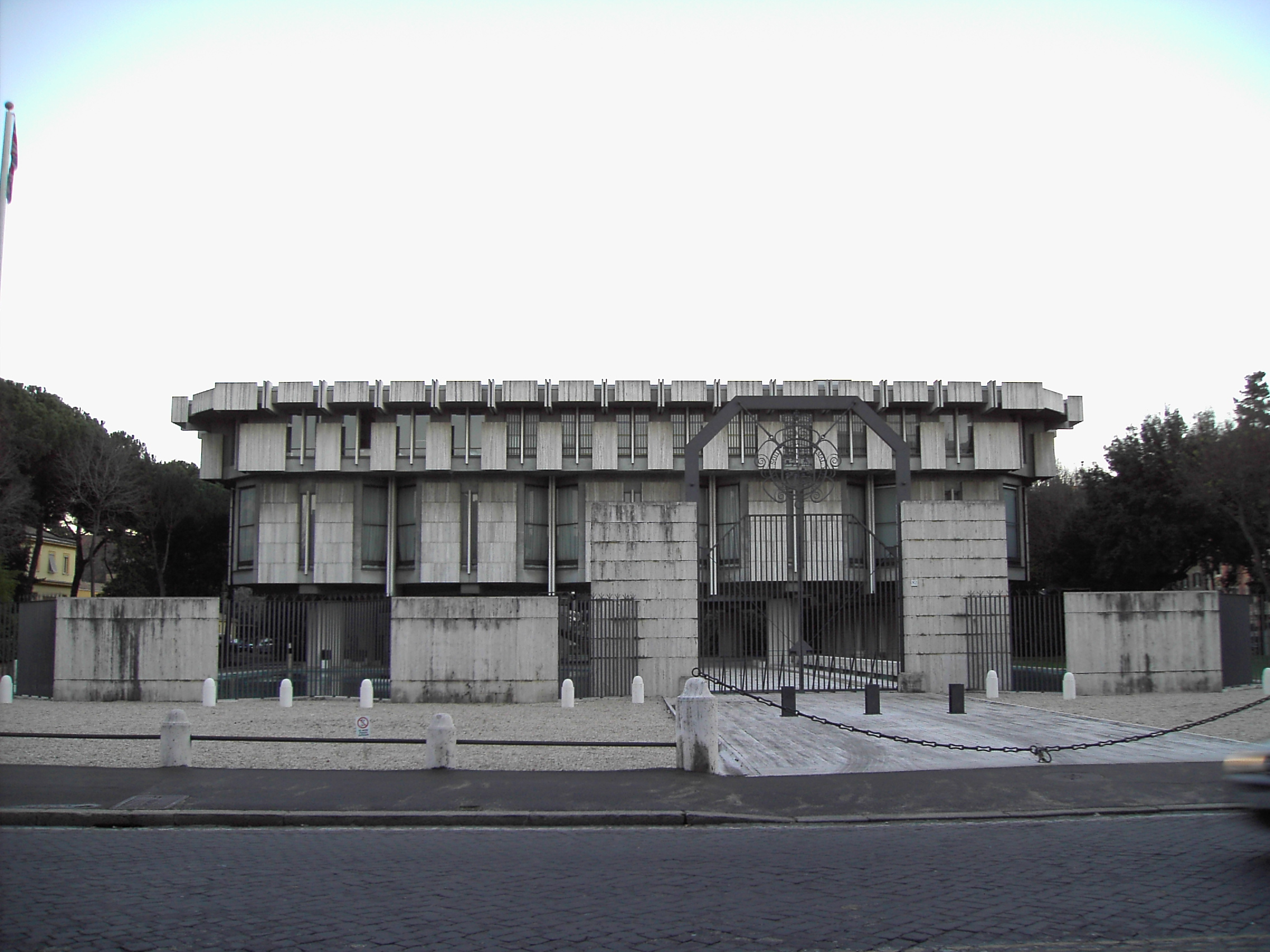
The Embassy of the United Kingdom, Rome

In 2004, following the bequest of Spence's drawings and office papers, the Sir Basil Spence Archive project was begun by the Royal Commission on the Ancient and Historical Monuments of Scotland (RCAHMS; now part of Historic Environment Scotland). A centennial exhibition Basil Spence Back to the Future was organised in Edinburgh, Coventry and London in 2007-8. In 2006, he was the subject of a BBC Scotland documentary, Rebuilding Basil Spence, which revised his place in 20th-century British architecture and asked why he had been for so long overlooked. In 2012, the book Basil Spence Buildings and Projects was published by the Royal Institute of British Architects (RIBA) as the culmination of the RCAHMS archive project and the work of an Arts and Humanities Research Council research project led by Louise Campbell of Warwick University.

In 1993 Spence's Hutchesontown C complex was listed by the international conservation organisation DoCoMoMo as one of Scotland's sixty key monuments of the post-war years, in the same year as it was demolished.

In August 2010, English Heritage recommended that the Spence-designed Sydenham School be given Grade II listed status: the building was due to be demolished to make way for a new building. However the government's decision was that the school was not of sufficient merit to warrant listing.

== List of projects ==
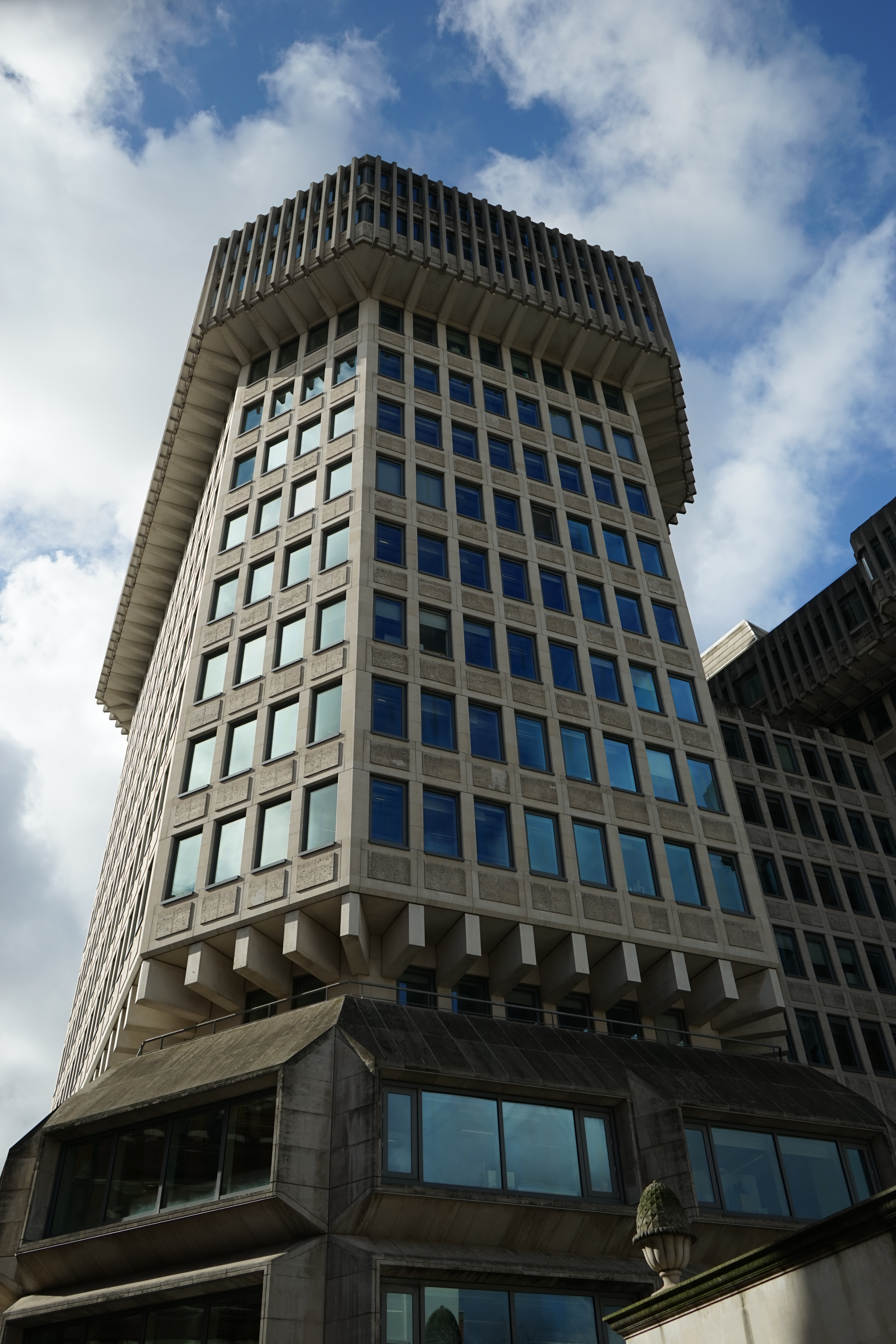
50 Queen Anne's Gate, London, completed 1976

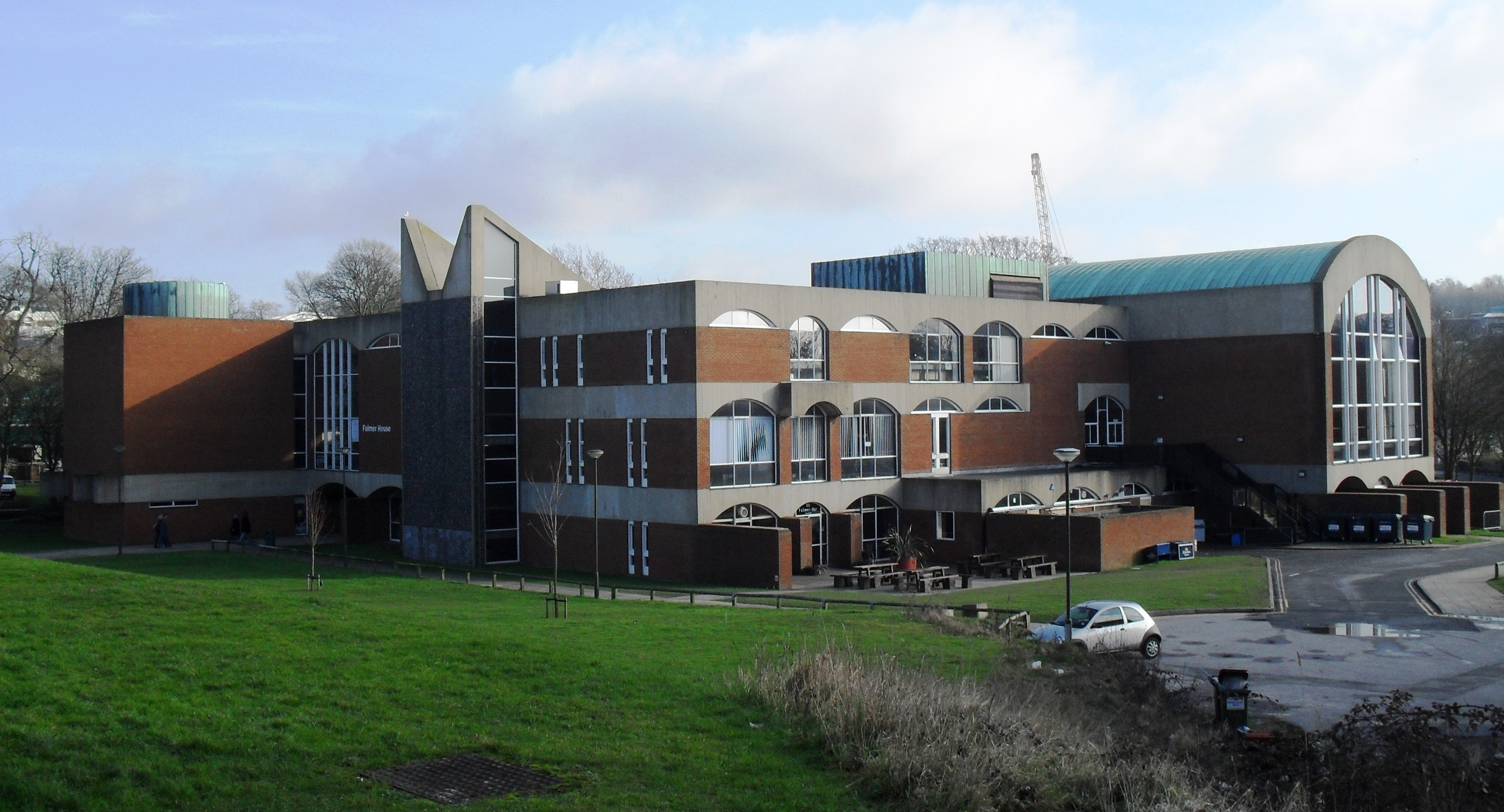
Falmer House (Grade I listed), part of the University of Sussex campus, 1962

- Broughton Place (country house in the style of a 17th-century Scottish tower house in Broughton, Peeblesshire with decorative reliefs by architectural sculptor Hew Lorimer) (1938)
- Dinnington High School, Rotherham. House bases and block complex (c. 1954)
- Gribloch (country house near Kippen, Stirling) (1938–39)
- Kilsyth Academy, Kilsyth (opened 1954, designed 1930)
- St Ninian and St Martin Church, Whithorn, Wigtownshire. (unrealised)
- Sea and Ships Pavilions for Festival of Britain (1951)
- Duncanrig Secondary School, East Kilbride, Greater Glasgow (1953)
- Basildon Town Centre is a planned town centre developed during the creation of the town of Basildon, Essex.
- Bannerfield Housing Estate, Selkirk, Scottish Borders, 1947-1962
- St Paul's Church, Wordsworth Avenue, Sheffield
- Sydenham School, Sydenham, London (1956)
- Agricultural Science Building, University of Nottingham, Sutton Bonington campus (1956–58)
- The churches of St Oswald, Tile Hill – St Chad, Wood End – St John the Divine, Willenhall. Built simultaneously in Coventry (1957)
- Thurso High School Thurso, Scotland (1957)
- The Chadwick Physics Laboratory (1957–9), University of Liverpool
- St. Hugh's Church, Eyres Monsell Estate, Leicester (1955–58)
- Campus development plan at the University of Nottingham (1957–60) including Chemistry Building, Physics and Mathematics Building, Mining and Fluid Mechanics Laboratory, Pope Building, Coates Building
- St Catherine of Siena, Richmond in Sheffield (1959)
- Thorn EMI House, 5 Upper St. Martin's Lane, London (1959) (Spence's original exterior was demolished in the 1990s; reborn as Orion House with a full-height floor plate addition and re-skinned elevations. A 60-foot-tall (18 m) metal sculpture by Geoffrey Clarke for the original façade (incorporating allusions to electric lamp filaments) has been remounted onto the added lift and service riser.)
- Great Michael Rise and Laverockbank Crescent, social housing developments in Newhaven, Edinburgh
- Erasmus Building, Friars Court, Queens' College, Cambridge (1959–1960)
- Froude Building, Highfield Campus, University of Southampton (1959–1966)
- 9 and 10 St Andrew Square, Edinburgh (1956–62)
- Swiss Cottage Leisure Centre (originally 'Swimming Baths'), London (1962–4) (demolished in 1999)
- Swiss Cottage Library (1962–1964), Grade II Listed Building since 1997.
- Spence House, near Beaulieu, Hampshire (designed 1961, for Spence's own use and listed Grade II)
- Coventry Cathedral, completed 1962
- The initial campus design at the University of Sussex (1960s) including Falmer House (1962, now a Grade I listed building)
- Hutchesontown C flats, Gorbals, Glasgow (1962 – demolished in 1993)
- Physics Building, Streatham Campus, University of Exeter
- Herschel Building, Newcastle University (1962)
- Nuffield Theatre, Highfield Campus, University of Southampton (1964)
- St Aidan's College, University of Durham (1964)
- The Beehive, the executive wing of the New Zealand Parliament Buildings Wellington, New Zealand (1964)
- Worshipful Company of Salters Hall, 1976. Spence died weeks before opening.
- Trawsfyndd Nuclear Power Station (1965)
- Edinburgh University Main Library
- Glasgow Airport (1966) (Spence's original façade was covered over in 1989 when an extension was built to house new check-in desks. The original structure can now be seen only from the check-in hall, departure gates and runway.)
- British pavilion, Expo 67 (1967)
- St Matthew's Church, Southcote, Reading (1967)
- Newcastle Central Library (1968) – demolished in 2007
- 65 – 103 Canongate, social housing developments in The Canongate, Edinburgh
- Civic Centre, Sunderland (1970) - demolished in 2022
- Hyde Park Barracks, London (1970)
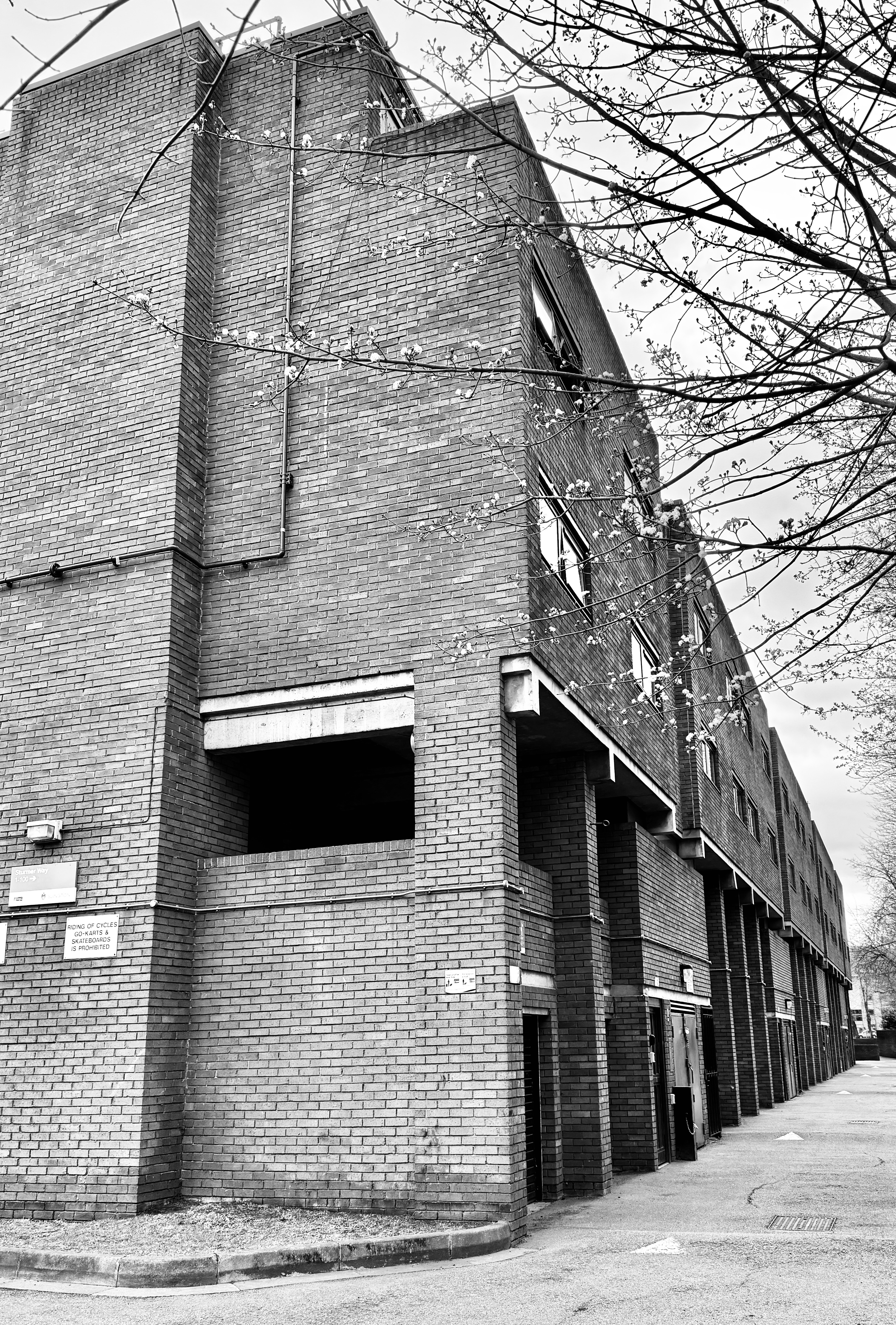
  Sturmer Way, Islington, completed 1970
- Sturmer Way, London (1970)
- British Embassy, Rome (1971)
- Glasgow Royal Infirmary redevelopment – Phases 1 & 2 (1971–82) – now known as the Queen Elizabeth Building and University Block
- Kensington and Chelsea Town Hall (1972–6), including chambers, offices, and public areas
- Aston University Library (1975) (Sir Basil Spence, Glover and Ferguson). Extended and remodelled in 2010
- 50 Queen Anne's Gate (the former Home Office building), London (1976)
- The Sydney Jones Library (1976) at the University of Liverpool

== See also ==
- Buildings and architecture of Brighton and Hove
- Category:Basil Spence buildings
