= APRS =

APRS may refer to:

- Action to Protect Rural Scotland
- Association of Professional Recording Services
- Automatic Packet Reporting System, amateur radio instant messaging and telemetry protocol
- Annual percentage rates (APRs)
