= Canongate Flats =

Brutalist Edinburgh residential development

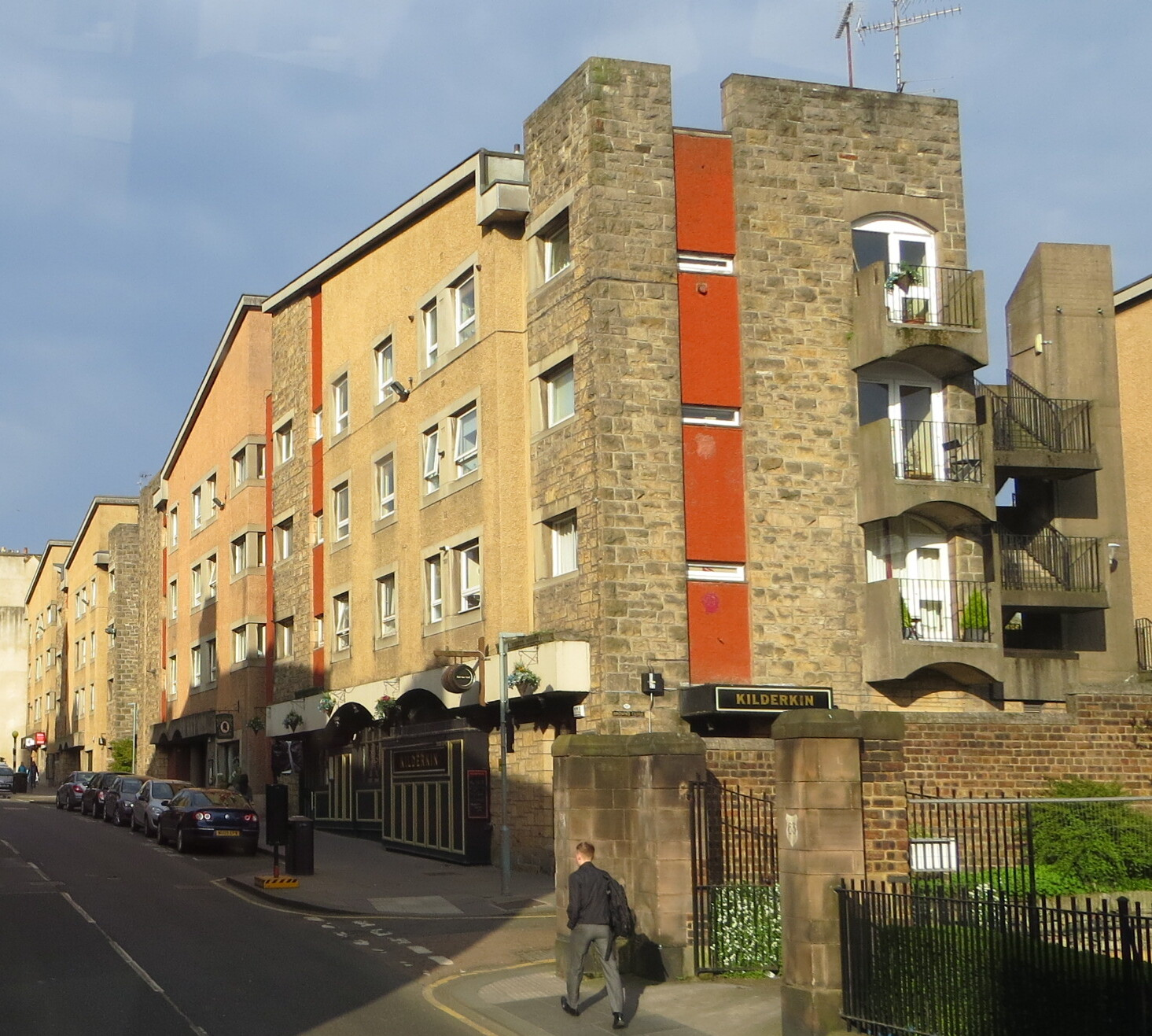
- Canongate Flats from Canongate looking west

- Shown in Edinburgh
- 55.95213°N 3.17730°W
- Location: East end of the Royal Mile, Edinburgh

History
- Built: 1969

Site notes
- Area: Canongate
- Architect: Sir Basil Spence
- Architectural style: Brutalist architecture

Listed Building – Category B
- Official name: 65-71 (odd nos) and 97-103 (odd nos) Canongate, including 1-3 (inclusive nos) Brown's Close, Edinburgh
- Designated: 26 September 2008
- Reference no.: LB51172

The Canongate Flats are a primarily residential development in Old Town, Edinburgh, designed by Scottish architect Basil Spence, and completed in 1969. There are 30 flats and 4 commercial premises over three buildings in the contextualist scheme, which belongs to the tradition of Brutalist architecture.

The Canongate Flats development has been Category B listed since 2008, on the statutory register of buildings of special architectural or historic interest, as maintained by Historic Environment Scotland. It is one of the 850 buildings worldwide to be profiled in the Phaidon Press' Atlas of Brutalist Architecture.

== Background ==
The flats were built as part of national initiatives to expand and improve the housing stock in the decades after the Second World War. Older tenements in Scotland were a particular focus and the Canongate Flats development was intended as a replacement for slums that were cleared in 1960, including the 17th-century Golfers Land tenement.

Basil Spence's firm, Sir Basil Spence, Glover & Ferguson, were given this commission by Edinburgh Corporation in April 1959 and it took 10 years to complete. The architects based this Edinburgh project on their earlier work on Hutchesontown C in Glasgow, but there were some key differences. The Canongate Flats are in the city centre, integrated into the surrounding buildings and this commission was smaller in scope and size. The development consists of 3 blocks, each 4 stories high, with the ground floor given over to commercial premises and a pub. The flats were a mix of studio, one and two bedroom apartments.

== Architectural components ==
Canongate Flats consists of three blocks. The two larger buildings face on to the north side of Canongate itself (shown in the design as blocks I on the west side and II on the east); with a smaller block III, to the northern rear of block II, and which looks over Brown's Close. There is a gap between the two Canongate blocks I and II, to accommodate the entrance for the 18th-century Canongate manse building.

The three blocks feature a bold and informal collection of materials. This includes monopitched roofs, lime-coated harled and rubble wall finishes, a mix of horizontal and vertical window types, projecting segmental and arched ground‑floor canopies. There are cubic concrete balconies positioned on the side and rear elevations. The staircases are integral to the design, but exterior and prominent. Many of these features were first deployed in Hutchesontown C. The properties' external display remains close to Spence's original design.

The overall effect both confronts and integrates to the surroundings. There is a sense of rhythmic movement along this modernist section of Canongate. The ground floor has a series of vaulted openings, allowing pedestrians to see the historic neighbouring buildings. There is a rear landscaped courtyard accessible by the vaults and Brown's Close.

The original files, letter, photographs and drawings created by Sir Basil Spence, Glover & Ferguson were held by the Royal Commission on the Ancient and Historical Monuments of Scotland and now by Historic Environment Scotland's archives and library in John Sinclair House in Edinburgh.

== Harry Younger Hall ==
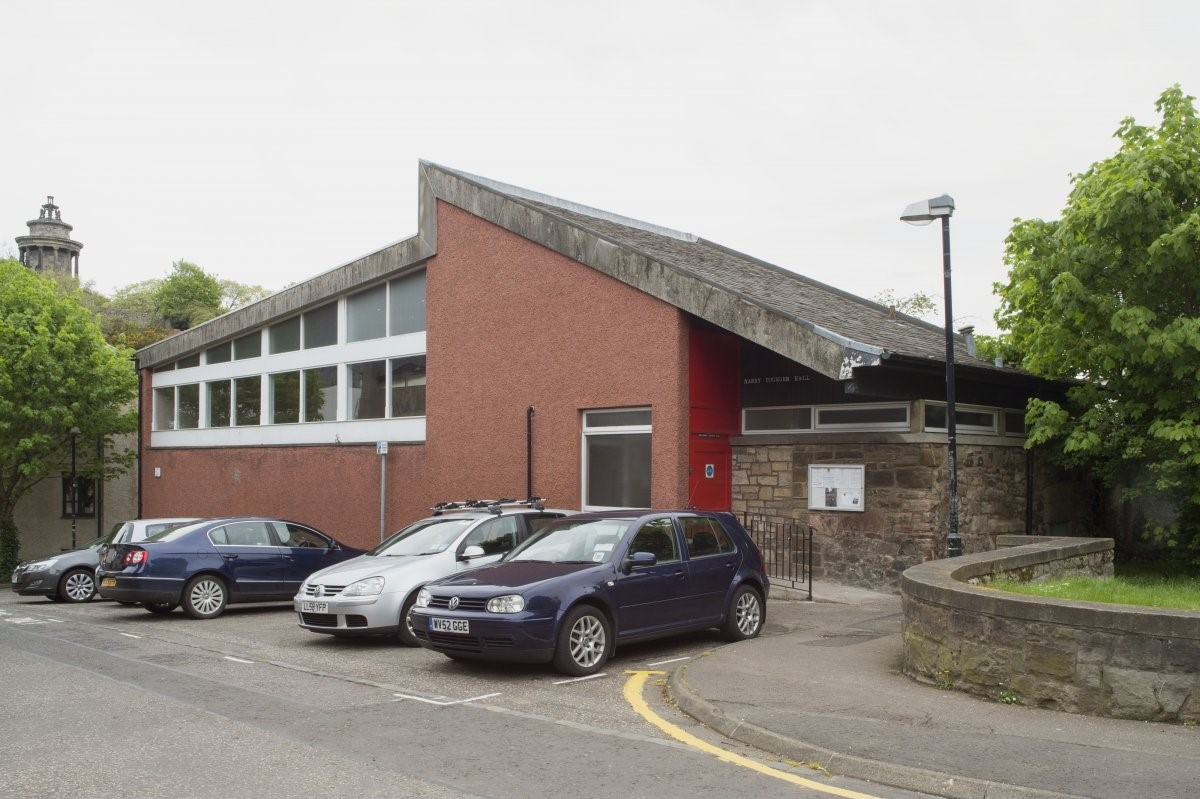
Harry Younger Hall

Behind Block I and the manse is the Harry Younger Hall, completed in 1968. This was also designed by Sir Basil Spence, Glover & Ferguson, however it is not currently listed. It was named after a member of the Younger family whose brewery used to dominate this end of Edinburgh, and who in 1940 was killed in action during World War II. It was originally the gym associated with the local church's Boys Club, and at the time of the commission it was listed as the Boys Club Gym. It now serves as a more general church hall. Spence designed it to complement the flats, and consequently it has a red-harled front, and the roof has a pitching that relates to the flats. It also incorporated a short section of the wall for the former tenement buildings that were cleared for the flats' development in the early 1960s.

== 2020 redevelopment ==
The flats were updated in a major project in 2020 to improve energy efficiency and to add better protection from the rigours of the Scottish weather.

== See also ==
- List of Brutalist structures
