= Reid Memorial Church =

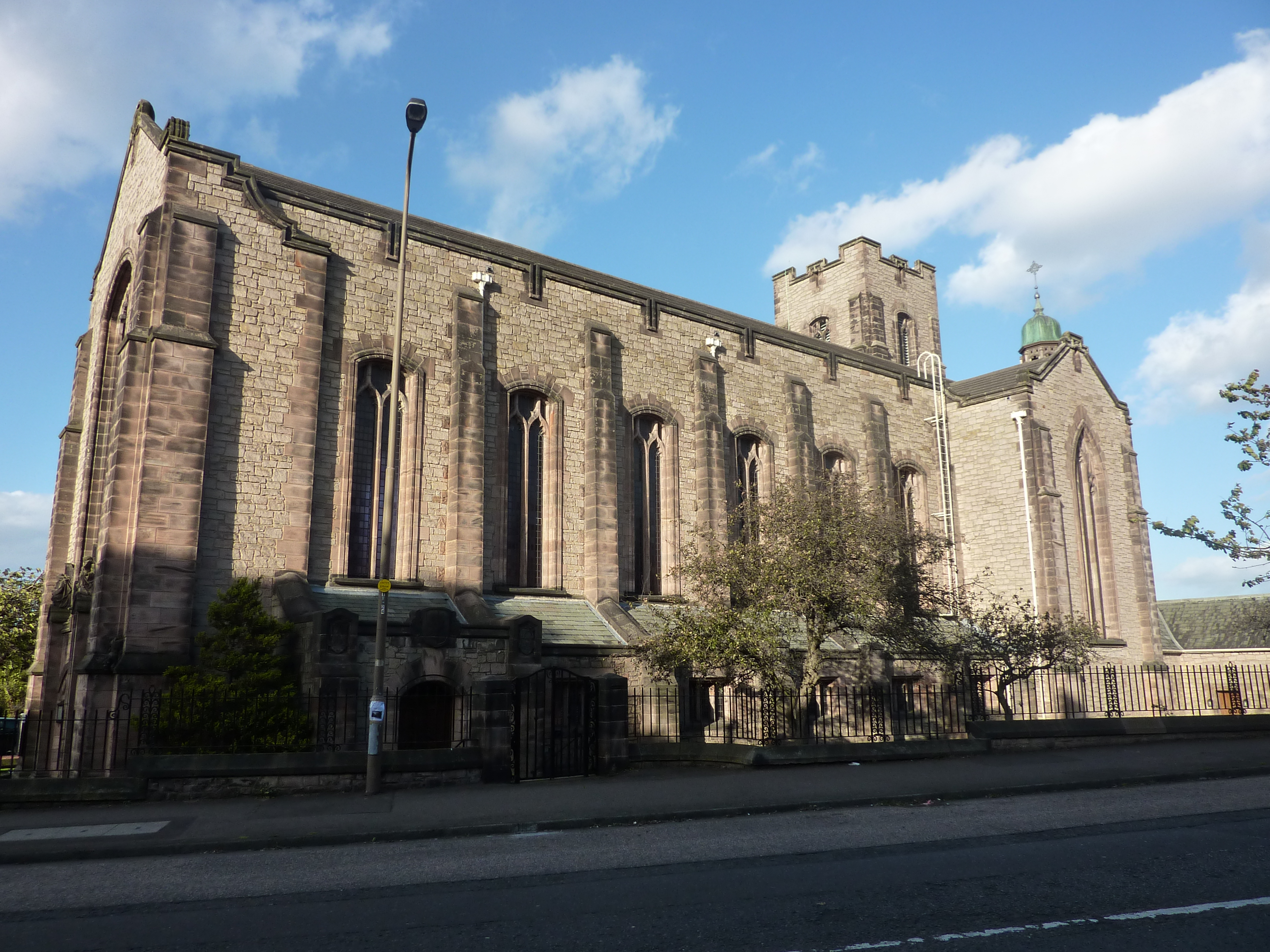
- Reid Memorial Church
- 55.9265°N 3.1849°W
- Location: Blackford, Edinburgh
- Country: Scotland
- Denomination: Church of Scotland
- Website: www.reidmemorial.org.uk

History
- Founded: January 1935

Architecture
- Heritage designation: Category A listed building
- Designated: 12 December 1974
- Architect: Leslie Grahame Thomson

The Reid Memorial Church is a church building in Edinburgh, Scotland, located in the Blackford area on the south side of the city. It was a congregation of the Church of Scotland (in the Presbytery of Edinburgh and West Lothian). On 1 January 2026 its congregation united with that of Marchmont St Giles Church in Marchmont, and is now known as Blackford and Grange Parish Church. Church Services are held in the Reid Hub on the third Thursday of each month at 2pm.

The Reid buildings will be sold by Church of Scotland. There is a group called Reid For The Community which is trying to buy the church for the benefit of the local community.

== History ==
After growing resentment within the Church of Scotland about the appointment of ministers by the patron of a church, the Disruption of 1843 led to the Free Church of Scotland. Among the ministers seceding was Dr. Robert Gordon, formerly of St Giles', and he became the first minister of the "Free High" congregation. After he died in 1853, he was succeeded by Robert Rainy, who was minister until 1862, and then followed by other eminent preachers and scholars. The United Free Church of Scotland was formed in 1900 when the Free Church combined with the United Presbyterian Church, which rejoined the Church of Scotland in 1929.

William Reid was a successful Edinburgh businessman during the 19th century, and when he died in 1889 he left his wealth to his four sons. The last son, William Crambe Reid, died without heirs in 1921 after inheriting the wealth of his brothers, and bequeathed his estate to the United Free Church to build a church in memory of his father, but the reunion of the churches had taken place before construction started. There already being an abundance of churches in the south side of Edinburgh, the Presbytery of Edinburgh moved the congregation of the Free High Church attached to the New College at the top of The Mound into the new building, as their building was to be used for the expansion of the activities of the College.

It was dedicated on 3 January 1935, and the first Sunday service, on 6 January, was officiated by Rev. J Marshall Robertson.

On 11 June 2019 the Rev. Alex McAspurren was inducted as minister of both Craigmillar Park Church and Reid Memorial Church, the two churches having been linked by the Presbytery of Edinburgh the previous year.

The final service as the 'Reid Memorial Church' took place on Sunday 28th December 2025. The congregation united with that of Marchmont St Giles Church to form the Blackford and Grange Parish Church, meeting in the church at Marchmont.

In October 2026, a local group called The Reid for the Community announced that it was exploring the possibility of buying the building for community uses, including for music, arts, clubs and "events for every generation".

== Details ==
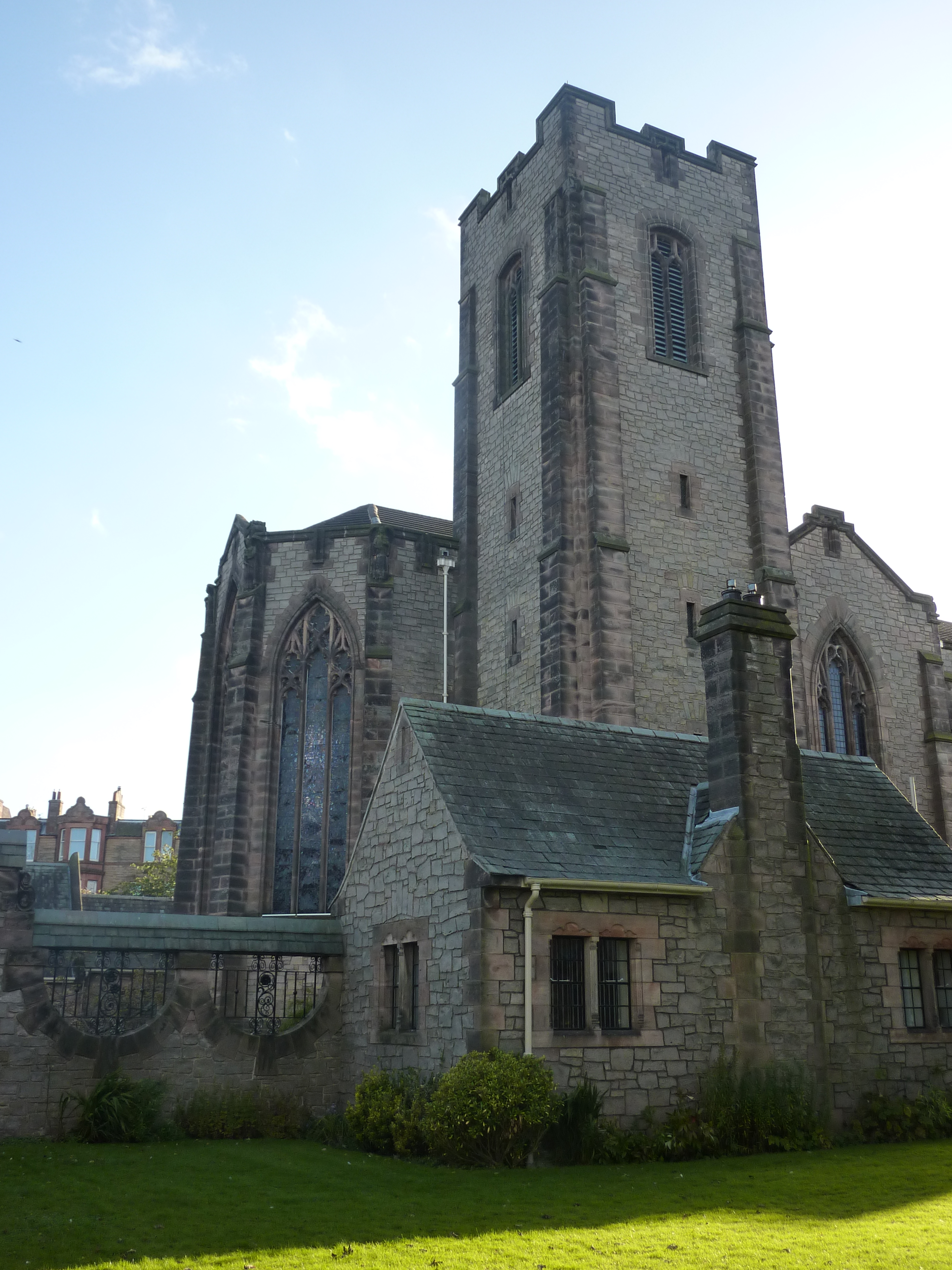
The tower to the south-east, with the cloister area below

The church was designed by Leslie Grahame Thomson and built between 1929 and 1933. It is in an Arts and Crafts Gothic style, replicating mediaeval churches with cathedral-like proportions and layout.

It consists of a cruciform with side aisles and a square tower to the south-east. To the east of this main section is a cloister court, around which are arranged vestries, the session house, a hall and the church officer's house. The windows along the side are decorated with tracery and there are flanking buttresses that travel above the height of the windows. The three windows of the chancery are decorated with stained glass by James Ballantine, depicting the Nativity, Crucifixion and Ascension.

The Church is located in a triangular area between West Savile Terrace to the north, and Blackford Avenue to the south, a steep hill that rises above it. It was protected as a category A listed building on 12 December 1974.

== Organ ==
The organ was built by Rushworth and Dreaper and has been carefully maintained by the Trustees of Reid Memorial Church.
