= Isabella Mears =

British physician, medical missionary and translator (1853–1936)

- Born: Isabella Bartholomew; 20 December 1853; Abercorn, West Lothian, Scotland, UKGBI
- Died: 11 November 1936 (aged 82); Inveresk, Midlothian, Scotland, UK
- Education: London School of Medicine for Women
- Occupations: Physician; medical missionary; translator
- Spouse: William Pope Mears (m. 1879; died 1901)
- Children: 4, including Frank Mears

Isabella Mears (née Bartholomew; 20 December 1853 – 11 November 1936) was a British physician, medical missionary and Chinese language translator. Part of the first wave of female physicians of the Victorian era, Mears worked as a medical missionary in Fujian from 1890 to 1893. Upon returning to Scotland Mears co-founded the Woodburn Sanatorium in 1895, one of the countries earliest tuberculosis sanatoriums.

== Early life and education ==
Mears was born Isabella Bartholomew in Abercorn, West Lothian to James Bartholomew, a farmer, and Jane Bartholomew (née Ford). By 1871, Mears was working as a governess and later trained as a teacher. Wanting to undertake missionary work, Mears was advised by Colin S. Valentine to pursue medical training in preparation.

In 1875, Mears enrolled at the newly founded London School of Medicine for Women. Mears obtained experience at Elizabeth Garrett Anderson’s New Hospital for Women, in dispensary work at Seven Dials, and later at the Royal Free Hospital after it opened its wards to female students. Mears completed midwifery training in Dublin and earned the LM credential in London.

In 1879, Mears married the physician and lecturer William Pope Mears. Upon her husband's appointment as a anatomist at the Durham University School of Medicine, the couple moved to Newcastle. In 1881 she obtained the L.K.Q.C.P.I. qualification in Ireland, one of the few professional pathways available to women, and became the twenty-fifth woman listed in the British Medical Register.

== Career ==
=== Missionary work ===
In 1890, Mears and her husband joined the Church Mission Society (CMS) and were sent on the South China Mission to Fujian, Fuzhou. By 1894, CMS employed 27 medical missionaries worldwide; Mears was the only female on this list.

Both Isabella and William Mears published letters in CMS periodicals during and after their missionary tenure describing their medical work, evangelism and encounters with local Chinese religious practices. Mears worked closely with Powers on medical treatment and Christian education of the local patient population. They assisted with women’s wards, outpatient wards, dispensary work, and the training of local students who were affiliated with the Fuh-Chow medical mission.

The family’s work in China ended in 1893 due to William Mears’s deteriorating health. After their return to England, he remained active in CMS affairs.

=== Edinburgh ===
The family settled in Edinburgh for the education of their children. In 1895, Mears established Woodburn Sanatorium in Morningside, Edinburgh. She was inspired to open the sanatoria after a visit to the Nordrach Clinic in Germany established by Otto Walther. Woodburn was one of the earliest Scottish facilities dedicated to open-air treatment of pulmonary tuberculosis, and the facility was part of a larger trend of smaller, open-air sanatoria opening across England and Scotland at the time inspired by Walther's Nordrach. Mears’ husband died in 1901, and she operated the sanatoria until she retired in 1922.

Mears continued to translated Chinese religion and philosophy in Scotland. She published several works on Chinese classical philosophy, including a 1916 translation of Tao Te Ching and a 1931 book Creative Energy which included a preliminary translation of the Yih King.

== Personal life ==
In 1879, Mears married the physician and lecturer William Pope Mears. The couple had four children, including the architect Sir Frank Charles Mears.

On 11 November 1936, Mears died in Inveresk, Midlothian (present-day East Lothian) aged 82.

== Bibliography ==
- Laozi (1916). Tao Te Ching. Translated by Mears, Isabella. Edinburgh: William McLellan.
- Mears, Isabella; Mears, Louisa E. (1931). Creative Energy: Being an Introduction to the Study of the Yih King, Or Book of Changes, with Translations from the Original Text. London: J. Murray.
