= Gorbals =

Area in the city of Glasgow, Scotland

Coordinates: 55.84861°N 4.25222°W

Gorbals: Scottish Gaelic: Gort a' bhaile
- Location within Glasgow
- Area: 0.83 km^{2} (0.32 sq mi)
- Population: 6,030 (2015)
  - Density: 7,265/km^{2} (18,820/sq mi)
- OS grid reference: NS 59100 64000
- Council area: Glasgow City Council
- Lieutenancy area: Glasgow
- Country: Scotland
- Sovereign state: United Kingdom
- Post town: GLASGOW
- Postcode district: G5
- Dialling code: 0141
- Police: Scotland
- Fire: Scottish
- Ambulance: Scottish
- UK Parliament: Glasgow East
- Scottish Parliament: Glasgow Shettleston

The Gorbals is an area in the city of Glasgow, Scotland, and former burgh, on the south bank of the River Clyde. By the late 19th century, it had become densely populated; rural migrants and immigrants were attracted by the new industries and employment opportunities of Glasgow. At its peak during the 1930s, the wider Gorbals district (which includes the directly adjoined localities of Laurieston and Hutchesontown) had risen in population to an estimated 90,000 residents, giving the area a very high population density of around 40,000/km^{2}.

Redevelopment after the Second World War has taken many turns, and the area's population is substantially smaller in the 21st century. The wider Gorbals area was once home to 16 high-rise public housing apartment blocks built in the 1960s and 1970s; now only four remain standing in the Waddell Court area of the Gorbals after the 2025 demolition of the 24 storey Caledonia road high rise flats.

== Meaning of placename ==
The name is first documented in the 15th and 16th centuries as Gorbaldis, and its etymology is unclear. It may be related to the Ecclesiastical Latin word garbale ('sheaf'), found in the Scots term garbal teind ('tenth sheaf'), a tithe of corn given to a parish rector. The taking of garbal teind was a right given to George Elphinstone in 1616 as part of his 19-year tack ('lease'). The place name would therefore mean 'the Sheaves'. The name is similar to a Lowland Scots word gorbal ('unfledged bird'), perhaps a reference to lepers who were allowed to beg for alms in public. Gort a' bhaile ('garden of the town') conforms with certain suggestions made by A. G. Callant in 1888, but other interpretations are also popular.

The village of Gorbals, known once as Bridgend, being at the south end of the bridge over the Clyde towards Glasgow Cross, had been pastoral with some early trading and mining. Thanks to the inventions of James Watt and others, the Industrial Revolution resulted in a major expansion of Glasgow during the nineteenth century.

In 1846 the city absorbed Gorbals. It then had a population of some 3,000. Many adults worked in cotton spinning and weaving factories, ironworks, and engineering. Increasingly in the 19th and 20th centuries, the area attracted numerous rural migrants from the surrounding countryside, including the Scottish Highlands, and immigrants from Ireland, Italy, Eastern and Central Europe, who found jobs to meet the needs of industrial capital.

== History ==
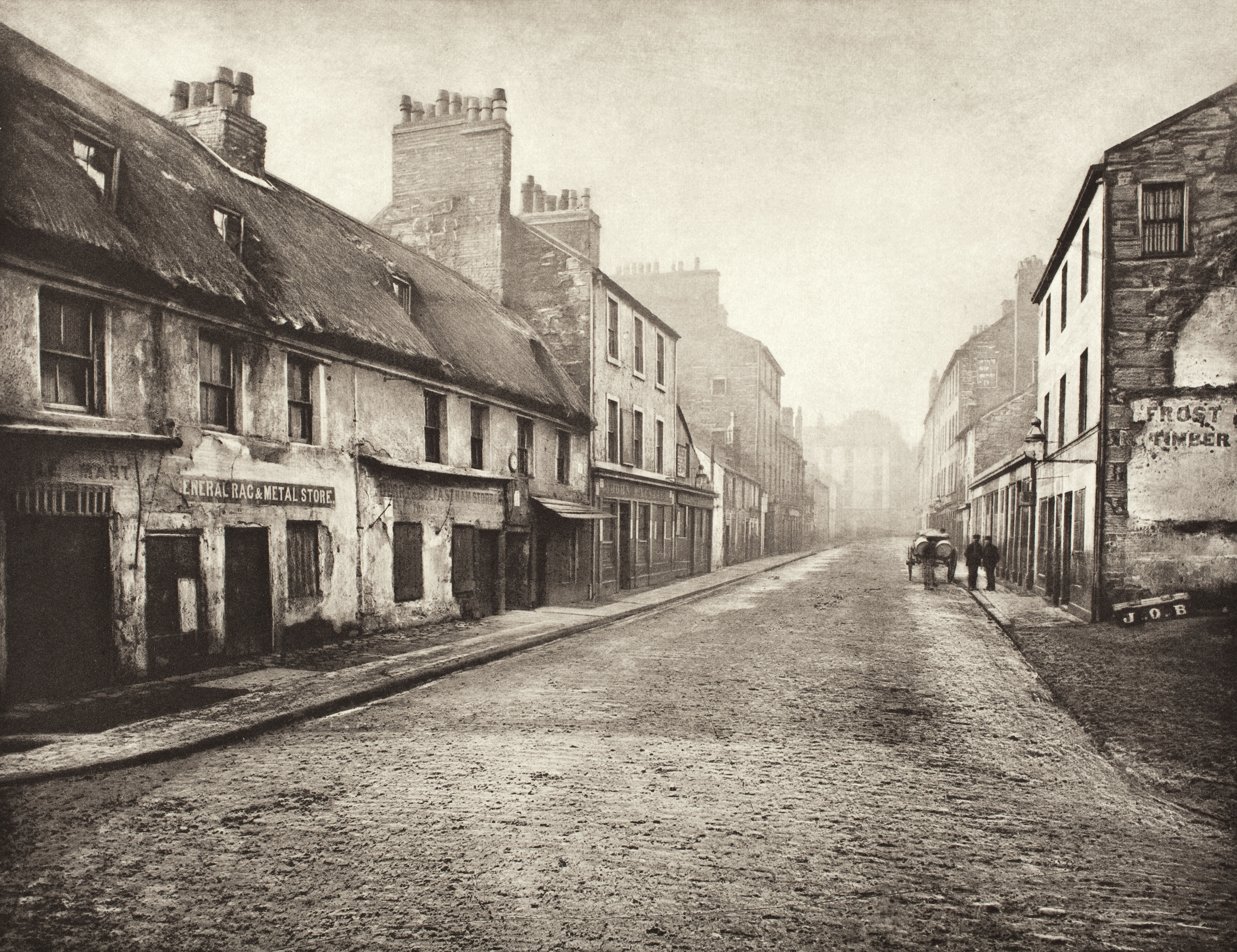
Main Street, Gorbals, looking south, 1868 by Thomas Annan

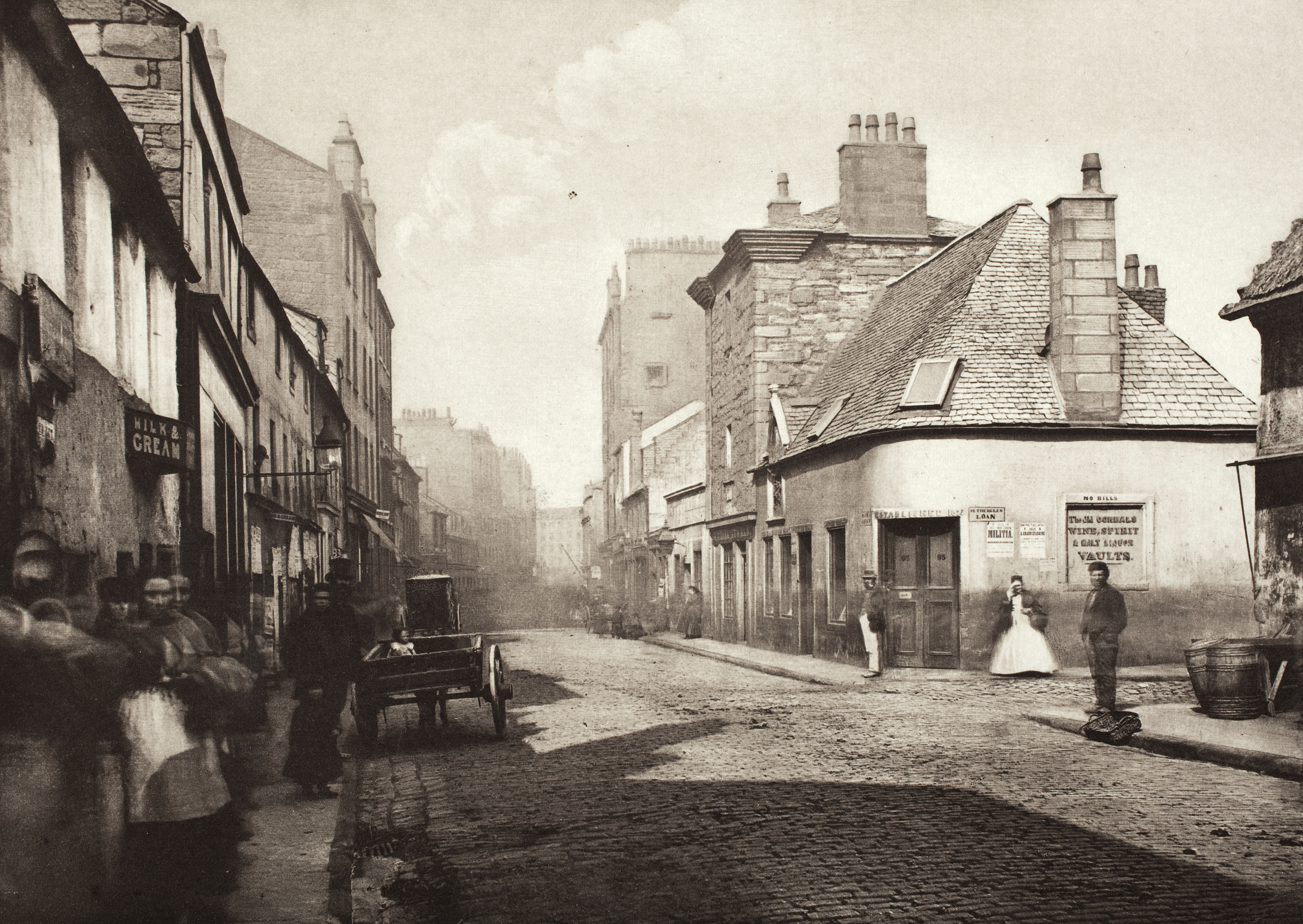
Main Street, Gorbals. Looking north, also 1868 by Thomas Annan

Govan parish was one of the oldest possessions of the church in the region. The merk land of "Brigend and Gorbaldis" is referred to in several sources. The village of Brigend was named after the bridge which Bishop William Rae had built in 1345 over the River Clyde; it lasted until the 19th century.

Lady Marjorie Stewart of Lochow was said to have had a hospital built for lepers and dedicated to St Ninian in 1350, although this year is contested by current historians' estimates dating her life and activities. The lands on which the hospital was built were named St Ninian's Croft. They were later incorporated into Hutchesontown.

After the Protestant Reformation, in 1579 the church granted the land for ground rents (feued the land) to Sir George Elphinstone, a merchant who was Provost of Glasgow (1600–1606). The barony and regality of the Gorbals was confirmed in 1606 by a charter of King James VI, which vested Elphinstone's son, also named George, and his descendants. These powers descended to Sir Robert Douglas of Blackerstone, who in 1650 disponed (legally transferred) the Gorbals to Glasgow's magistrates for the benefit of the city, the Trades' House, and Hutchesons' Hospital. The magistrates from then on collected the rents and duties and divided them: one fourth to the city, one fourth to the Trades' House, and the remaining half to Hutchesons' Hospital.

In 1790 the lands were divided into lots for development; the city acquired the old feus of Gorbals and Bridgend, and also the Kingston portion of the Barony of Gorbals. The Trades' House obtained a western section; and the remaining section lying to the east and south was allocated to Hutchesons' Hospital. The Hutcheson's Trust sub-feud a portion of their lands to an ambitious builder, James Laurie. (His grave, along with those of many other builders of Gorbals, is marked with well-carved masons' implements, indicating his Master status. The gravestones are visible at the Burial Ground, established in 1715 and now called the Gorbals Rose Garden). Laurie built the first house in St Ninian Street in 1794.

The districts are now known as the Gorbals, Laurieston, Tradeston, Kingston and Hutchesontown. The Little Govan estate, including a small village of the same name, were replaced by the eastern parts of Hutchesontown and Oatlands.

By the late 19th century, The Gorbals was a successful industrial suburb, and attracted many Protestant and Catholic immigrants from Ireland, especially from Ulster (in particular from County Donegal), and Italy, as well as Jewish immigrants from the Russian Empire and Eastern Europe. At one time most of the Jews in Scotland resided in this area. Industrial decay and over-population overwhelmed the area, which became a centre of poverty in the early 20th century. Gorbals railway station opened on 1 September 1877. Changes in the area meant a decrease in business, and it closed to passengers permanently on 1 June 1928.

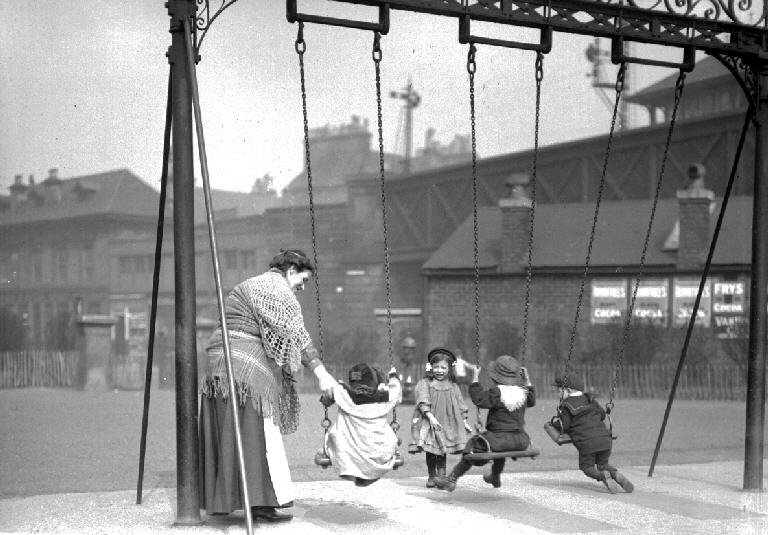
Main Street, Gorbals, 1911

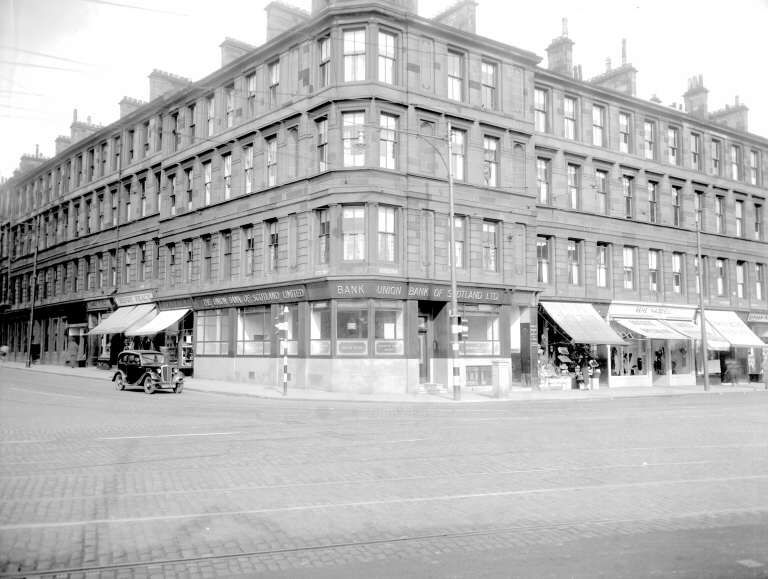
Eglinton Street, Gorbals, 1939

In the 1870s, the City Improvement Trust cleared away the old Gorbals village and redeveloped the area to form the new Gorbals Cross, at the same time developing new workers' tenements around the former Oatlands Square.

Much of the early Gorbals village was replaced by modern tenements in the street grid system being adopted in the city centre and notably in the south side, including neighbouring Tradeston, Kinning Park and Hutchesontown. Along the riverside the classical terraces of Laurieston had taken shape.

By 1914, the population of Gorbals and Hutchesontown was working locally and in commerce in the city centre, factories and warehouses nearby of carpetmaking, garment making, food manufacturing, ironworks, chemical works, railways, docks, shipping, construction and engineering. The area supported some 16 schools, 15 churches, three synagogues, swimming baths and libraries, and a range of picture-houses, dance halls and two theatres. One theatre, the Royal Princess, has survived as the Citizens Theatre today.

Of the suburb's 19,000 houses, 48% were now classed as overcrowded. To remedy over-crowding and lack of modern facilities for water and sanitation within houses, local authority housing was started in the 1920s on new areas being brought in by the city's expansion of boundaries. The combination of redevelopment and loss of industrial jobs resulted in the population of Gorbals and Hutchesontown falling by 21% between 1921 and 1951. By 1964 there were 12,200 houses.

As took place in London and other major cities, in the post-war planning of the 1950s, Glasgow Corporation joined with other authorities in deciding to demolish much sub-standard housing of inner districts including Gorbals and Hutchesontown. Families were dispersed to new outlying housing estates such as Castlemilk, in overspill agreements with New Towns such as East Kilbride. Other families were rehoused within the area but in huge, concrete, multi-storey towers. These changes broke up many close-knit communities, adding to the residents' distress. The Corporation identified 29 Comprehensive Development Areas (CDAs), where the only solution was complete destruction of all existing housing and rebuilding from scratch. The Gorbals became the largest, and best known of all the CDAs since it was used as a testing ground for some of the housing schemes which were planned for other areas of the city.

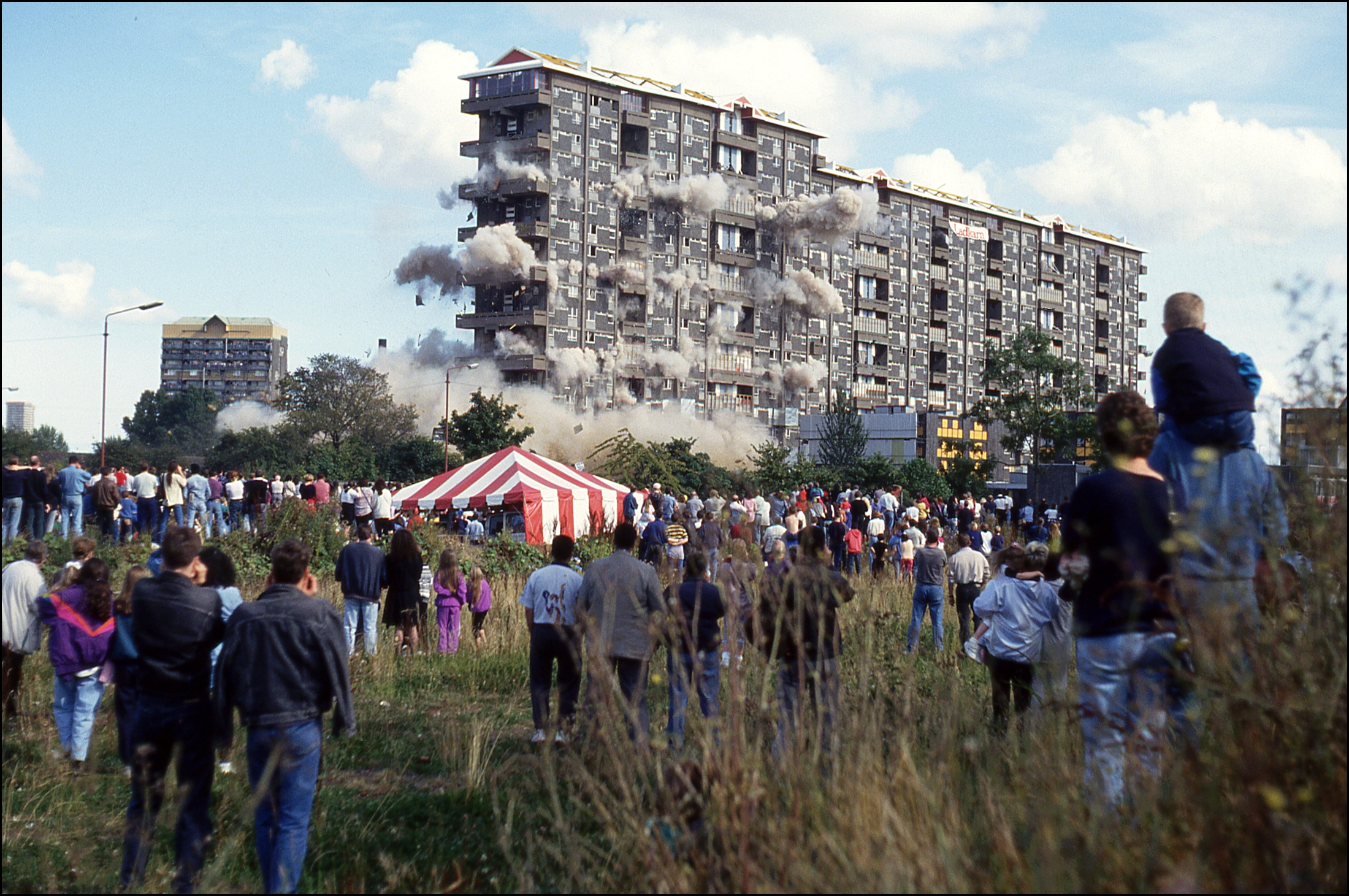
The Queen Elizabeth Square flats were demolished in 1993.

Glasgow Corporation's replacement of old, outdated and crowded housing with new high-rise towers of social housing in the 1960s greatly improved some physical conditions but had adverse social consequences. Lack of awareness of the effects of concentrating families resulted in poor design. The low-quality construction of the concrete, 20-storey flats led to various social and health problems among the residents. Many of the blocks developed mould and structural problems. Their designs prevented residents from visually controlling their internal and external spaces, adding to issues of social dysfunction. The Queen Elizabeth Square flats, designed by Sir Basil Spence, were demolished in 1993 to make way for a new generation of housing development.

In 2004, Glasgow Housing Association announced plans to demolish more of the decaying high-rise blocks, and to comprehensively refurbish and re-clad others. Two of the Area D blocks (Caledonia Road), as well as the entire Area E (Sandiefield) and Laurieston (Stirlingfauld / Norfolk Court) high-rise estates, were demolished between 2002 and 2016. In 2025, the two remaining tower blocks of the Area D estate were demolished, meaning that the Area B or "Riverside" estate, designed by Robert Matthew, contain the only high rise blocks left in the wider Gorbals area. New housing has been developed at lower density,

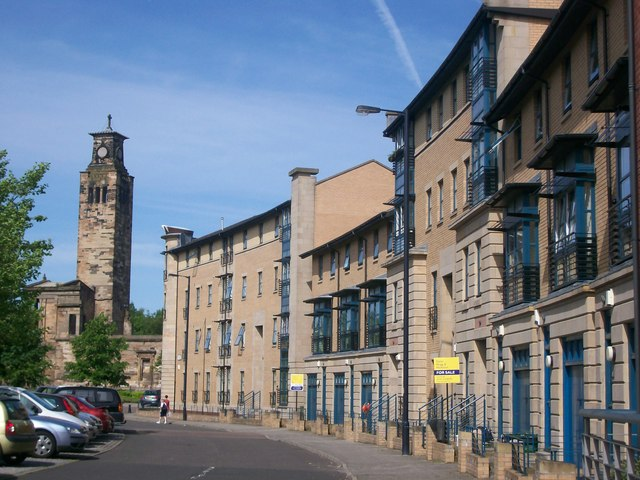
Alexander Crescent, Gorbals, in 2011, with Caledonia Road Church tower in background

Since the late 20th century, much of the area, particularly Hutchesontown, was comprehensively redeveloped for a third time. It has included a mix of private (market rate) and social housing, with design elements to encourage residents' and public safety. Earlier phases of this recent redevelopment tended toward yellow-brick reinterpretations of traditional tenements, in a post-modern style. The neighbouring Govanhill district to the south (whose residents observed the demolition/modernisation in nearby areas such as the Gorbals and Pollokshaws with suspicion and successfully opposed the same fate befalling their homes, although they faced other challenges to improve their living conditions) offers some reminder of how the district used to look prior to its redevelopment. The tenement buildings faced directly onto the street, connecting the residents to the community. Since the late 1990s, some neighbourhoods have been redeveloped as terraces of tenements in that style.

More recent phases, planned by Piers Gough, have employed noted modern architects such as Page/Park, Elder & Cannon and CZWG, resulting in more bold and radical designs. Innovative street plans and high-quality landscaping have been added, incorporating many pieces of public art. The Gorbals Leisure Centre opened in January 2000. The number of shopping facilities in the area is on the rise. In 2005, fire destroyed the Catholic Church of Blessed John Duns Scotus as a result of a fallen candle. The church was restored and reopened for worship in September 2010.

After much of the Hutchesontown area of the Gorbals was improved, the urban and social-regeneration program expanded into the neighbouring Laurieston area to the west.

In the early 2000s, a local heritage group started a campaign to reinstate the Gorbals Cross fountain, aided by people attracted to the group's Facebook page, known as Old Gorbals Pictures (Heritage Group). The group have discovered that a copy of the original fountain was installed on the Caribbean island of Saint Kitts and Nevis. They are working to engage professional help to digitally scan this object to allow for the manufacture of 'Gorbals Cross, No 3', to be installed in a new development near to where it originally stood.

Since 1945, the Citizens Theatre has been based in the area at the former Royal Princess's Theatre, an historic Victorian building. The area also has a local newspaper Local News for Southsiders. The area is served by Bridge Street and West Street subway stations and numerous bus routes.

One of the few buildings to survive the mid-20th century redevelopment is a pub called The Brazen Head, located at the northern end of Cathcart Road. Formerly a railway pub known as the Granite City, much of its clientele is Celtic F.C. supporters. They have been associated with Irish Republicanism. Nearby is the architectural masterpiece of the Caledonia Road Church, a Category A-listed mid-Victorian structure with remaining walls and tower designed by Alexander "Greek" Thomson.

== Historical maps ==
A large selection of historical maps of the Gorbals is available from the National Library of Scotland.

== Notable natives and residents ==
- Jimmy Boyle (b. 1944), convicted criminal, novelist and sculptor
- Ian Brady (1938–2017; born in the Gorbals and named Ian Duncan Stewart); notable as the Moors murderer.
- Frank Bruno, a notable boxer, moved to the Gorbals in 2012 to live with his partner.
- Lawrence Chaney (b. 1996), drag queen and winner of the second series of RuPaul's Drag Race UK
- Paddy Connolly (b. 1970), football player and coach
- Owen Coyle (b, 1966), football player and manager
- Paddy Crerand (b. 1939), football player and MUTV pundit (Celtic and Manchester United)
- Tommy Docherty (1928–2020), football player and manager (Celtic, Preston North End, and Chelsea)
- Dame Carol Ann Duffy (b. 1955), Poet Laureate of the UK from 2009 to 2019
- Hannah Frank (1908–2008), artist and sculptor
- Ralph Glasser (1916–2002), psychologist and economist, writer of a three-volume autobiography, beginning with Growing up in the Gorbals
- Alex Harvey (1935–1982), musician
- William Haughey, Baron Haughey (b. 1956), businessman and philanthropist
- Alexander Watson Hutton (1853–1936), a teacher and sportsman; considered the father of Argentine football, as he established teams there
- Lorraine Kelly (b. 1959), television presenter, journalist and actress
- Helena Kennedy (b. 1950), Labour member of the House of Lords
- John Kurila (1941–2018) footballer who played briefly for Celtic F.C. as well as playing for Northampton Town and other English and Canadian clubs.
- Sir Thomas Lipton (1848–1931), grocery mogul, founder of Lipton's Tea, and perennial contender for the sailing world's America's Cup.
- Benny Lynch (1913–1946), boxer, became the British, European and World Flyweight Champion.
- Gerry McAloon (1916–1987), football player with Brentford F.C., Wolverhampton Wanderers F.C., Celtic F.C. and Belfast Celtic F.C.
- Michael McGurk (1958–2009), born here and moved to Australia, where he became a businessman; he was murdered outside his Sydney family home.
- Gerry McLauchlan (b. 1989), formerly resident of Bishopbriggs, former footballer with Brechin City and Ayr United
- John Maclean (1879–1923), socialist politician; stood for election in the area in the 1918 general election.
- Frank McLintock (b. 1939), football player and pundit (Arsenal)
- John Martyn (b. 1948), musician
- Robert Millar (b. 1958), cyclist, the first English-speaking wearer of the "King of the Mountains" jersey in the Tour de France (1984)
- Allan Pinkerton (1819–1884), born and raised here; he achieved fame in the United States by establishing Pinkerton's detective agency.
- William "Jock" Ross (b. 1943), the founder of the Australian outlaw Comanchero Motorcycle Club.
- Phil (b. 1937) and Derek Shulman (b. 1947), born here, these brothers became musicians; performed with the 1970s British progressive rock band Gentle Giant.
- John Spencer (Scottish footballer) (b. 1970), football player and manager
- Joe Yule (1892–1950), stage comedian and father of actor Mickey Rooney

== Representation in other media ==
- Robert McLeish's play The Gorbals Story (1946) is set there. Originally produced by the Glasgow Unity Theatre, it was adapted as a 1950 film by the same name.
- "The Jeely Piece Song" – a song written by Adam McNaughtan and sung by Matt McGinn (Scottish songwriter) among others uses humour to express profound change in the area's way of life.

== See also ==
- Glasgow tower blocks
- Southern Necropolis, a burial ground in the Gorbals
