= Leslie Grahame Thomson =

Scottish architect (1896–1974)

Leslie Grahame Thomson Macdougall
- Born: 14 August 1896
- Died: 4 June 1974 (aged 77)
- Education: Edinburgh College of Art
- Occupation: Architect
- Practice: Leslie Grahame Thomson & Connell, Leslie Grahame-Thomson & Associates
- Buildings: Reid Memorial Church, Edinburgh

Leslie Grahame Thomson FRIBA ARSA FRIAS (14 August 1896 – 3 June 1974) was a Scottish architect, the son of Patrick Thomson, the department store proprietor. Born in Edinburgh he was educated at Merchiston Castle School and commenced his architectural training at Edinburgh College of Art under Sir George Washington Browne and John Begg. Thomson was articled to Sir Robert Lorimer and admitted ARIBA on 14 February 1927.

In 1927 Thomson set up his own architectural practice, with Frank James Connell becoming his business partner in 1937. The partnership with Connell was dissolved at the start of the Second World War during which Thomson taught at Edinburgh College of Art.

Thomson was joint secretary of the Action to Protect Rural Scotland with Sir Frank Mears, President of the Edinburgh Architectural Association 1949–1951, and President of the Royal Incorporation of Architects in Scotland 1953–1955.

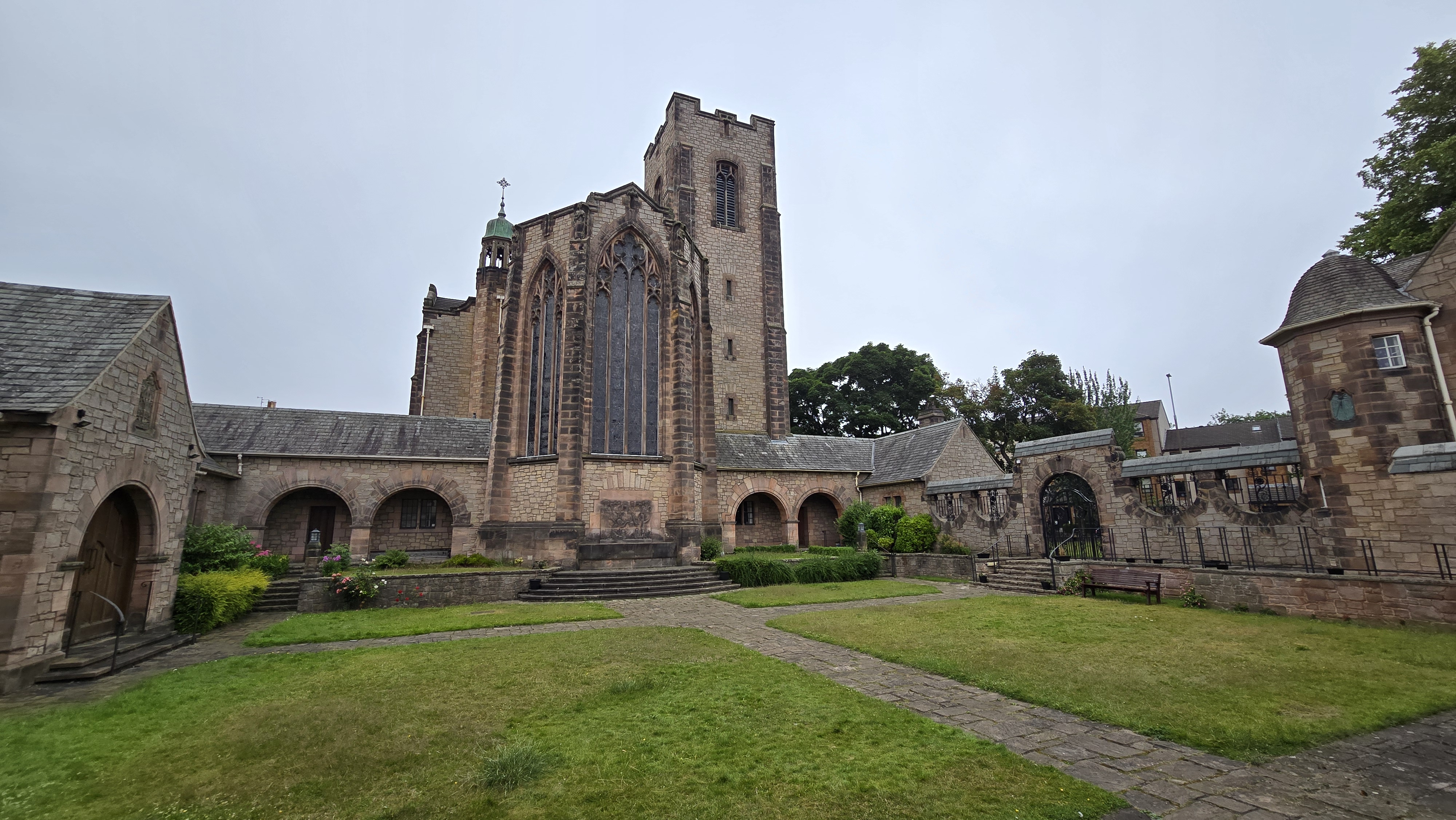
Reid Memorial Church, Edinburgh

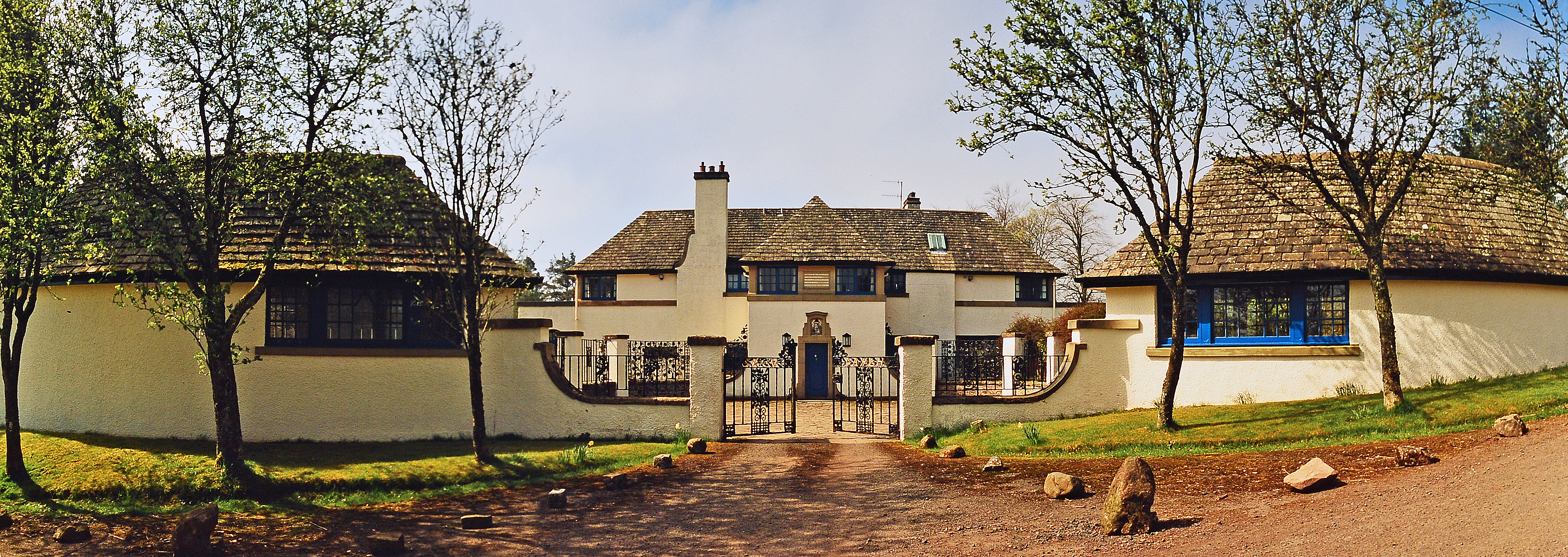
Srongarbh, West Linton

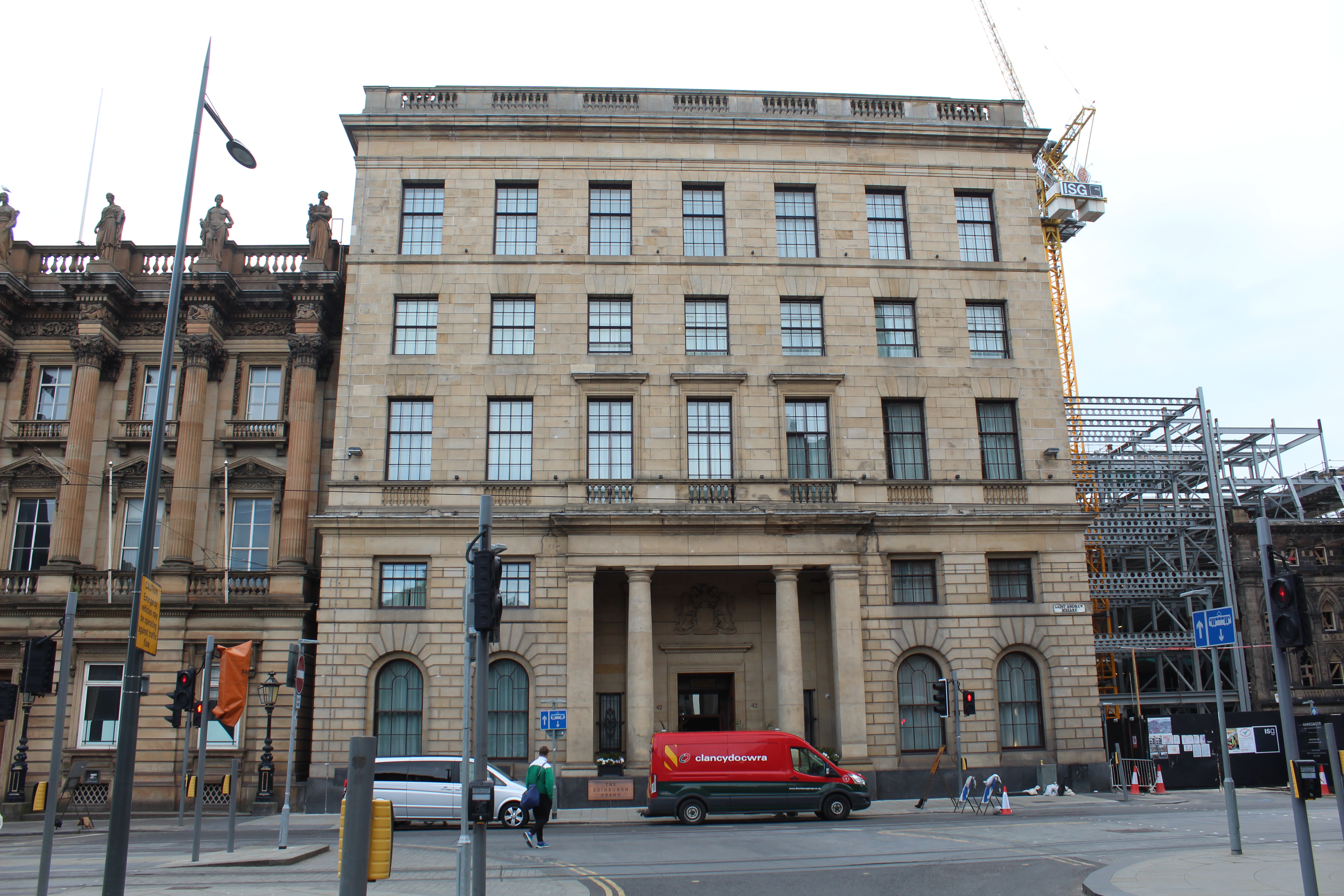
National Bank of Scotland, Edinburgh

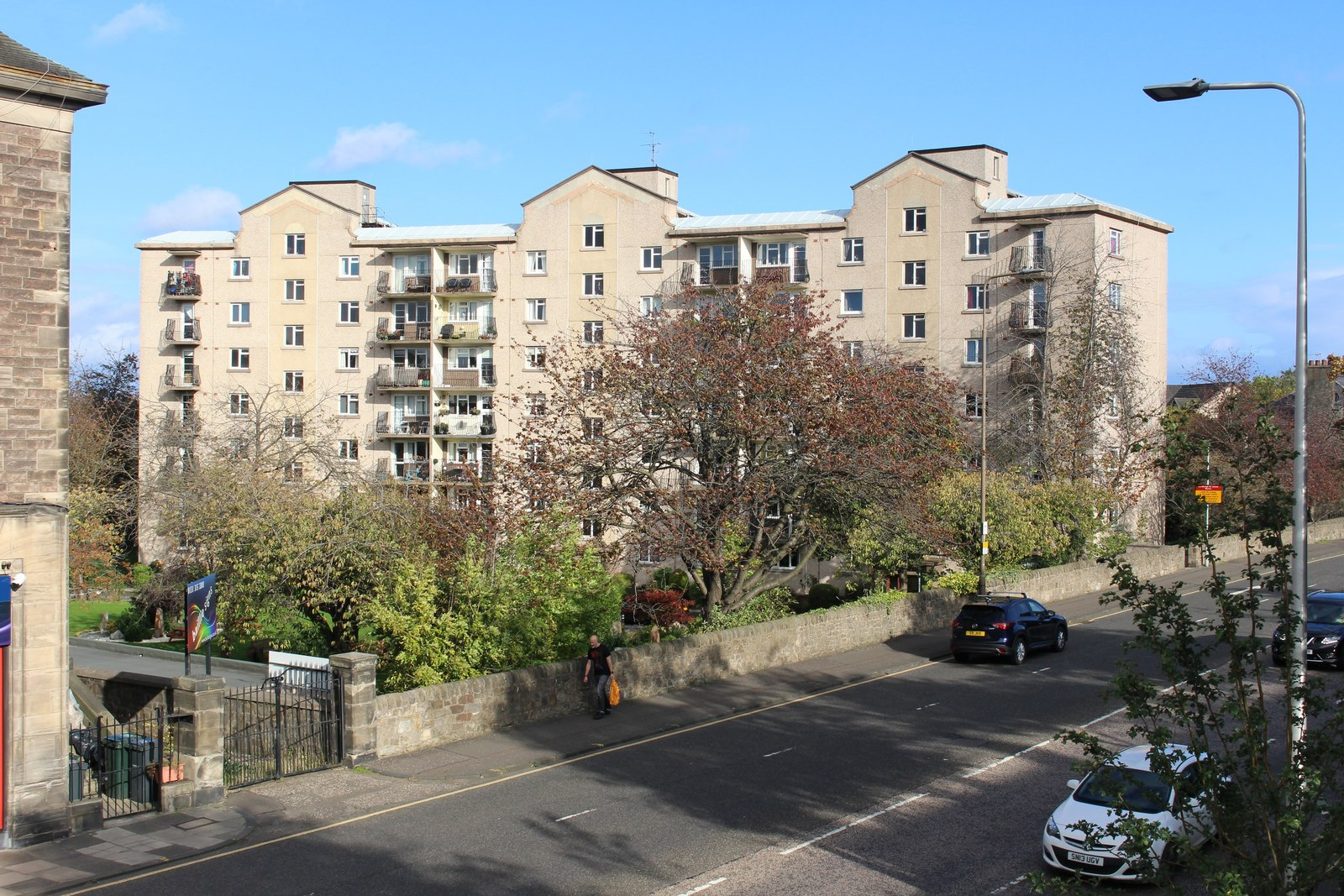
Maidencraig Court, Edinburgh

When his second wife, Coline Helen Elizabeth MacDougall, became Clan Chief of Clan MacDougall in 1953 he took the surname of MacDougall. He died at Dunollie, Oban.

== Notable Buildings ==
- Reid Memorial Church, Edinburgh (1929)
- Srongarbh, West Linton (1934)
- Isobel Fraser Home of Rest, Inverness (1936)
- National Bank of Scotland, Edinburgh (1936)
- Fairmilehead Parish Church, Edinburgh (1937)
- Caledonian Insurance Company, Edinburgh (1938)
- Maidencraig Court, Edinburgh (1950)
- Moncur Memorial Church, Stronsay (1953)
- Ulva House, Isle of Ulva (1955)
- Christ Church Dunollie, Oban (1957)
