= Association of Professional Recording Services =

APRS
- The Association of Professional Recording Services
- Headquarters: Kent, England
- Location: United Kingdom
- Website: http://aprs.co.uk

The Association of Professional Recording Services (APRS) is a trade association for the audio industry in the United Kingdom.

== Overview ==
The APRS is present within the British audio industry and lobbies on behalf of their members for a positive working environment. Their members are involved in many aspects of the audio field, including recording studios and post-production houses. They provide education and training, as well as record production, audio engineering and manufacturing. The APRS also has relationships with other organisations and industry bodies synchronizing with their members interests.
