= Hutchesontown C =

Architectural structure in Glasgow City, Scotland

Coordinates: 55.848°N 4.246°W

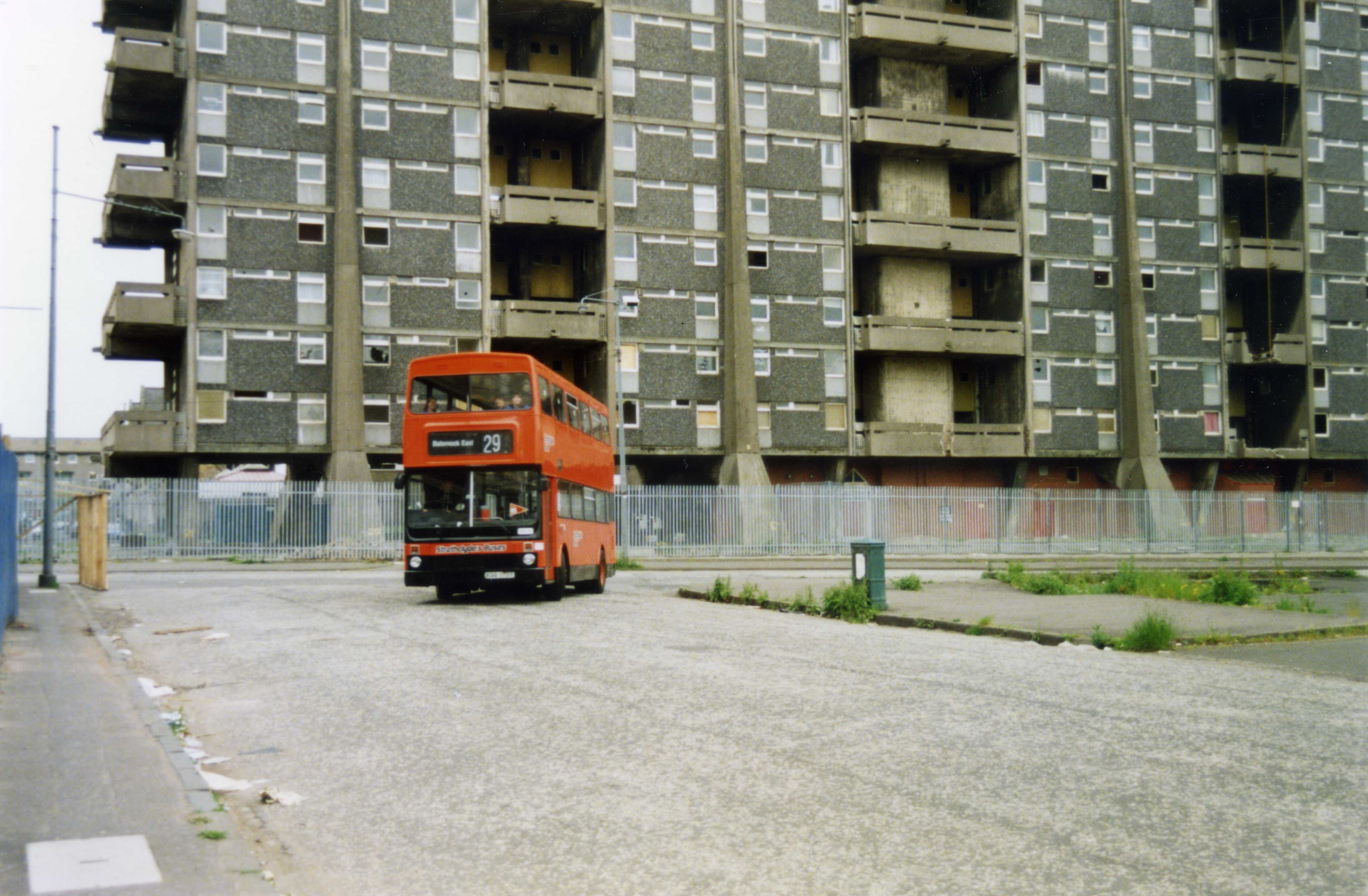
- Interactive map of the Hutchesontown C area

General information
- Status: Demolished
- Architectural style: Brutalist
- Location: Gorbals, Glasgow, Scotland
- Opened: 1962
- Demolished: 1993
- Client: Glasgow Corporation

Design and construction
- Architect: Basil Spence

Hutchesontown C was a Comprehensive Development Area (CDA) of an area of Hutchesontown, a district in the city of Glasgow, Scotland. Its centrepiece were two Brutalist 20-storey slab blocks at 16-32 Queen Elizabeth Square, designed by Sir Basil Spence and containing 400 homes. Acclaimed by architects and modernists, the flats became riddled with damp and infestations, which could not be cured even with a major renovation in the late 1980s. They were demolished in 1993, with the demolition contractor using twice the amount of explosive necessary to destroy the building, killing a female spectator in the process.

== Design ==
The aim was to replace 62 acres (25 hectares) of slums in Hutchesontown with new low and high rise housing, schools and shops. The development consisted of five phases – A through E – each designed by a different architect. Sir Basil Spence and his assistant Robert Matthew were assigned their site in a series of meetings at the Department of Health for Scotland in late 1957 and 1958. After going independent from Spence and forming his own practice, Matthew later designed the adjacent Area B or "Riverside" estate which opened in 1964, and unlike Area C, has survived to the present day. The main block was split into three sections, A, B and C – with two service shafts containing lifts and staircases serving the tower. The dwellings were designed so that each flat had a dual front and rear aspect – with the bedrooms and living room on opposite sides, and the flats were accessed from a corridor on odd numbered floors, with a short staircase either going "up" or "down" from corridor level.

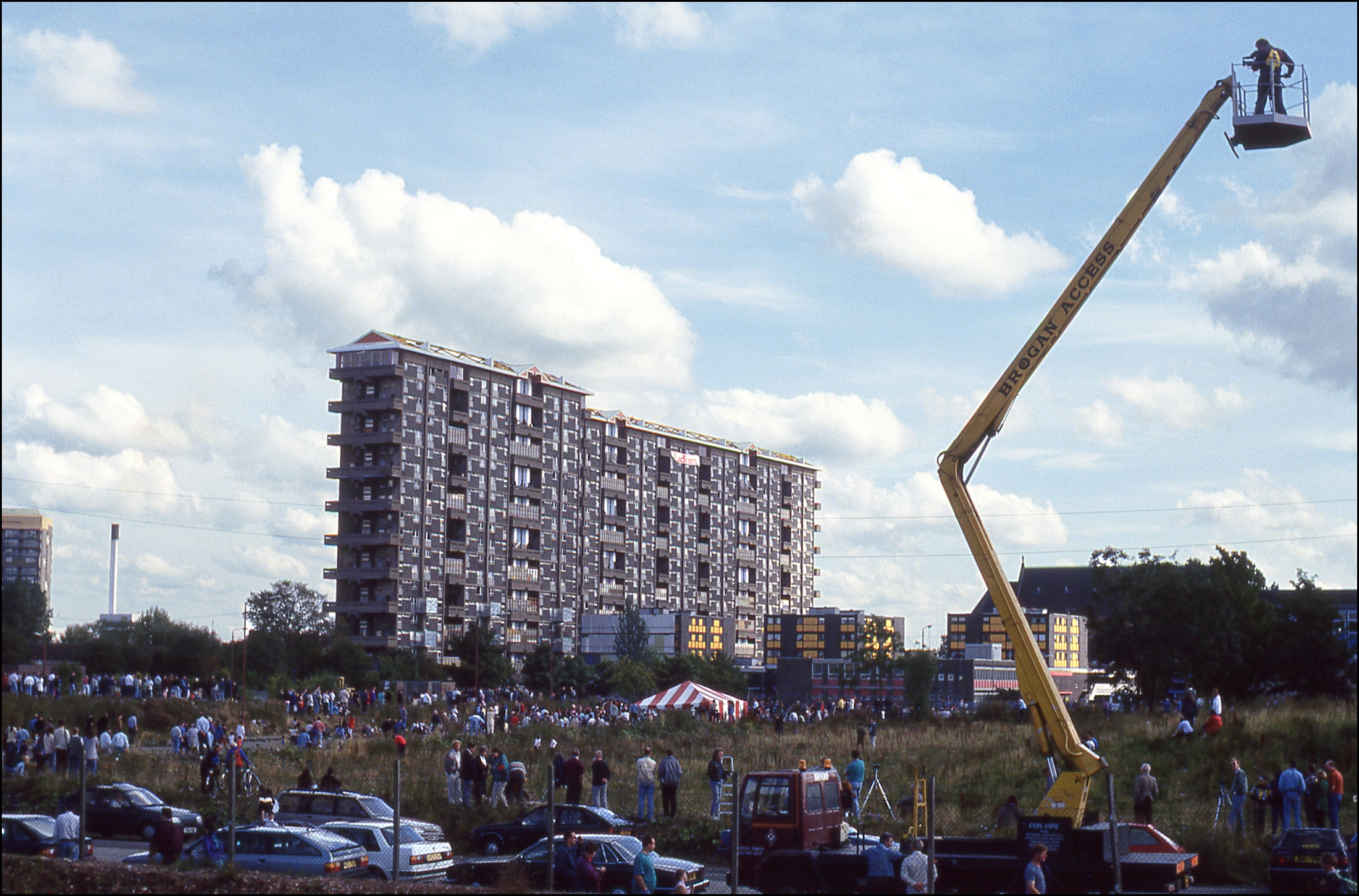
16-32 Queen Elizabeth Square, moments before demolition

Hutchesontown C was commissioned in 1959, with Spence receiving assistance from a project architect, Charles Robertson. Spence and Robertson, partly inspired by Le Corbusier's Brutalist maisonette blocks in Marseille, designed two "colossal, rugged 20-storey slabs" featuring inset communal balconies. In revealing the design, Spence said to the Glasgow Corporation's Housing Committee that "on Tuesdays, when all the washing's out, it'll be like a great ship in full sail", a reference to Glasgow's shipbuilding heritage. He hoped to revive working-class life of the tenement back green. His remarks helped break down resistance to tall blocks among the councillors.

== Construction ==
Although Spence began work in 1960 at about the same time as constructors George Wimpey began work on their three 20-storey blocks in the Royston area of Glasgow, George Wimpey's Royston 'A' flats were ready for occupation before Spence had finished his foundations. Queen Elizabeth II unveiled a commemorative plaque on the base of the block on 30 June 1961. The Scottish Office normally set a ceiling on costs of housing at £2,800 per dwelling, but Spence was allowed to exceed it; Robertson recalled that the width of some flats was reduced by half an inch in order that their cost came down to below £3,000 per flat. The Glasgow Corporation and the Housing committee under David Gibson made an exception to their normal demand for speed and output in housing schemes on the project. The construction work was undertaken by Holland & Hannen and Cubitts (Scotland) Ltd, and the buildings were finally ready for occupation in 1965.

== Problems ==
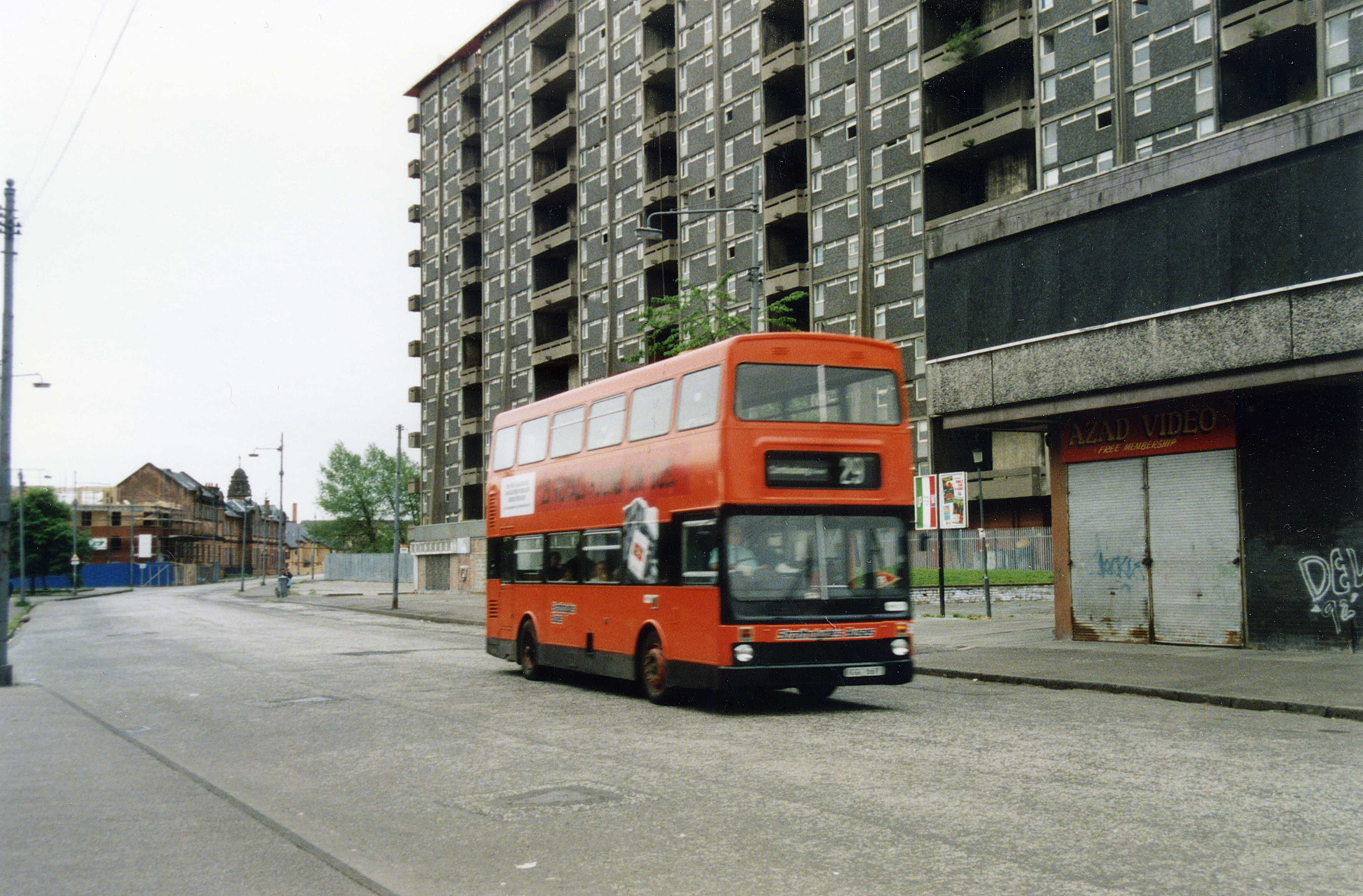
Queen Elizabeth Flats in 1993

The blocks were popularly known as 'Hutchie C' and nicknamed 'The Hanging Gardens of the Gorbals' in reference to the large balconies arranged in groups of four throughout the building. For the first ten years the building was reasonably popular with its inhabitants, particularly in comparison with the conditions they had endured in the dilapidated tenements, although the reality of the 'ship in full sail' was that washing frequently blew away when hung out at such heights, while doors and windows were also subject to wind damage. Tenants and pedestrians also complained of high winds near the base of the buildings (caused by the venturi effect – common when tall buildings are grouped closely together) which were reportedly strong enough to literally "lift you off your feet". However, life in the building proved to be less popular over time because the maintenance required for such a large and complex structure had been underestimated from the beginning. By November 1976, the local MP Frank McElhone, councillors and Scottish Office officials, attended a meeting called by the Laurieston and Hutchesontown Tenants' Associations, which pressed for a solution to the problems of damp and fungus in the buildings, water running down the walls and water beetles lodging in children's clothing. Several tenants had been following a rent strike for a year to get action from Glasgow District Council. The future of the blocks was a major issue in the 1982 by-election in the Glasgow Queen's Park burgh constituency, which covered the site.

The persistent dampness, coupled with the attendant problems of vandalism and the uncompromising design, meant that by the 1980s the complex had become a by-word for all that was worst in public sector housing. In 1987 and 1988, the City Council undertook a major renovation, adding a sloping white roof with pediments, placing bright blue cladding around the exteriors of lift shafts, and enclosing the by-then unusable balconies in conservatories.

== Demolition ==
Despite the work, the dampness problem was not solved. In early 1993 the council found that £15–20 million needed to be spent to make the flats habitable and the remaining tenants were decanted in preparation for demolition. The modernist architectural conservation organisation DoCoMoMo protested at the decision and applied to Historic Scotland to have the buildings listed and preserved; they included the blocks as one of Scotland's key modernist monuments.

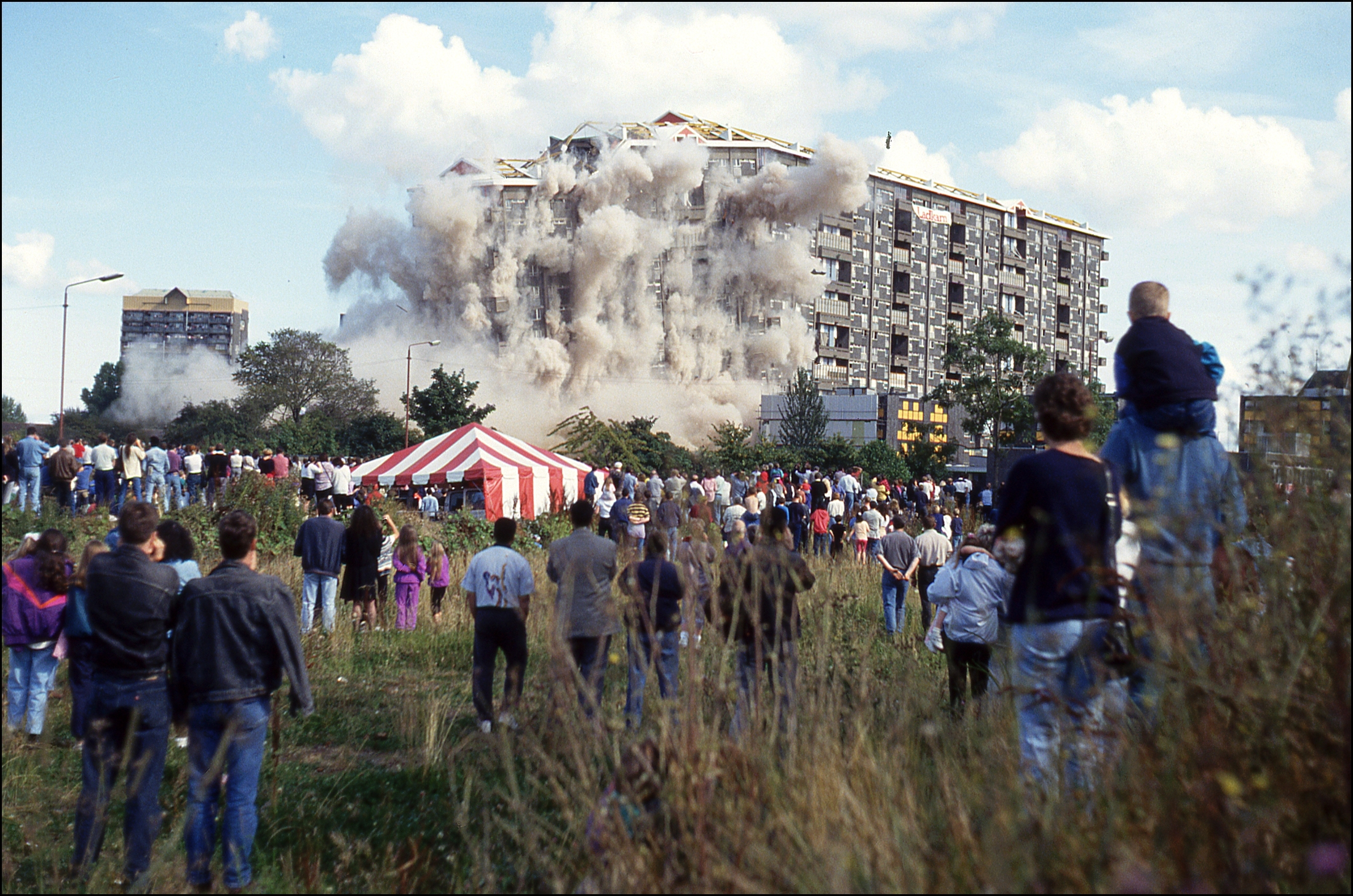
Demolition of 16-32 Queen Elizabeth Square

On Sunday 12 September 1993, Glasgow District Council (now Glasgow City Council) invited local people and the media to witness the 'blowdown' of the blocks at noon. The public viewing area was placed too close to the building and debris hit the crowd, killing 61-year-old Helen Tinney who lived locally and injuring four others. Miles Glendinning and Stephen Muthesius's book Tower Block published the following year expressed the hope that it might also have "dealt a fatal blow to that most conspicuous ritual of Anti-Modernism–the demolition of tower blocks as public theatre". The inquiry into the accident revealed that the demolition contractor had used twice the amount of explosive necessary to fell the structures – no explosive demolition of a tower block was carried out in Glasgow for another nine years, partly as a consequence.

== Posthumous reputation ==
The Royal Institute of British Architects' book about Spence's life and work, Basil Spence: Buildings and Projects, published in 2012, remarks that in hindsight, Hutchesontown C diverged sharply from Spence's other mass-housing projects and that there is a debate about whether his attempt to design a building with a "forceful, metaphoric character" was appropriate for mass housing. The book complains about the "indignant media cacophony" which accompanied debates about Hutchesontown C before it was demolished.

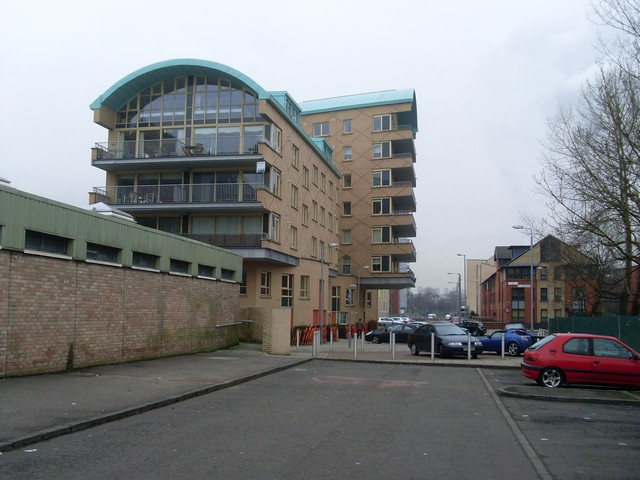
The design features of Queen Elizabeth Gardens echo the buildings it replaced

The buildings were viewed by contemporary critics (along with other flagship high rise estates in Glasgow such as Red Road) as monuments to the mistakes of the city's post-war housing renewal policy, and despite their demolition over 30 years ago they retain some notoriety. An exhibition at Gorbals Library paying tribute to Spence in early 2008 was heavily criticised by a former local Councillor, who noted that the blocks had become known as 'Alcatraz'.

Low rise housing no greater than eight storeys high now occupies the site and was constructed in the 2010s. One of the blocks is named "Queen Elizabeth Gardens" and has distinctive end balconies as an architectural homage to the original Spence towers.

== See also ==
- Housing in Glasgow
- List of tallest voluntarily demolished buildings
- List of Brutalist structures
