= Frank Mears =

Scottish architect and planner (1880–1953)

Sir Frank Mears
- Born: 18 July 1880; Tynemouth, Northumberland, England
- Died: 25 January 1953; Christchurch, New Zealand
- Occupation: Architect Planner
- Movement: Town and Country Planning
- Spouse: Norah Geddes

Sir Frank Charles Mears PPRSA FRSE LLD (11 July 1880 – 25 January 1953) was an architect and Scotland's leading planning consultant from the 1930s to the early 1950s.

== Life and work ==
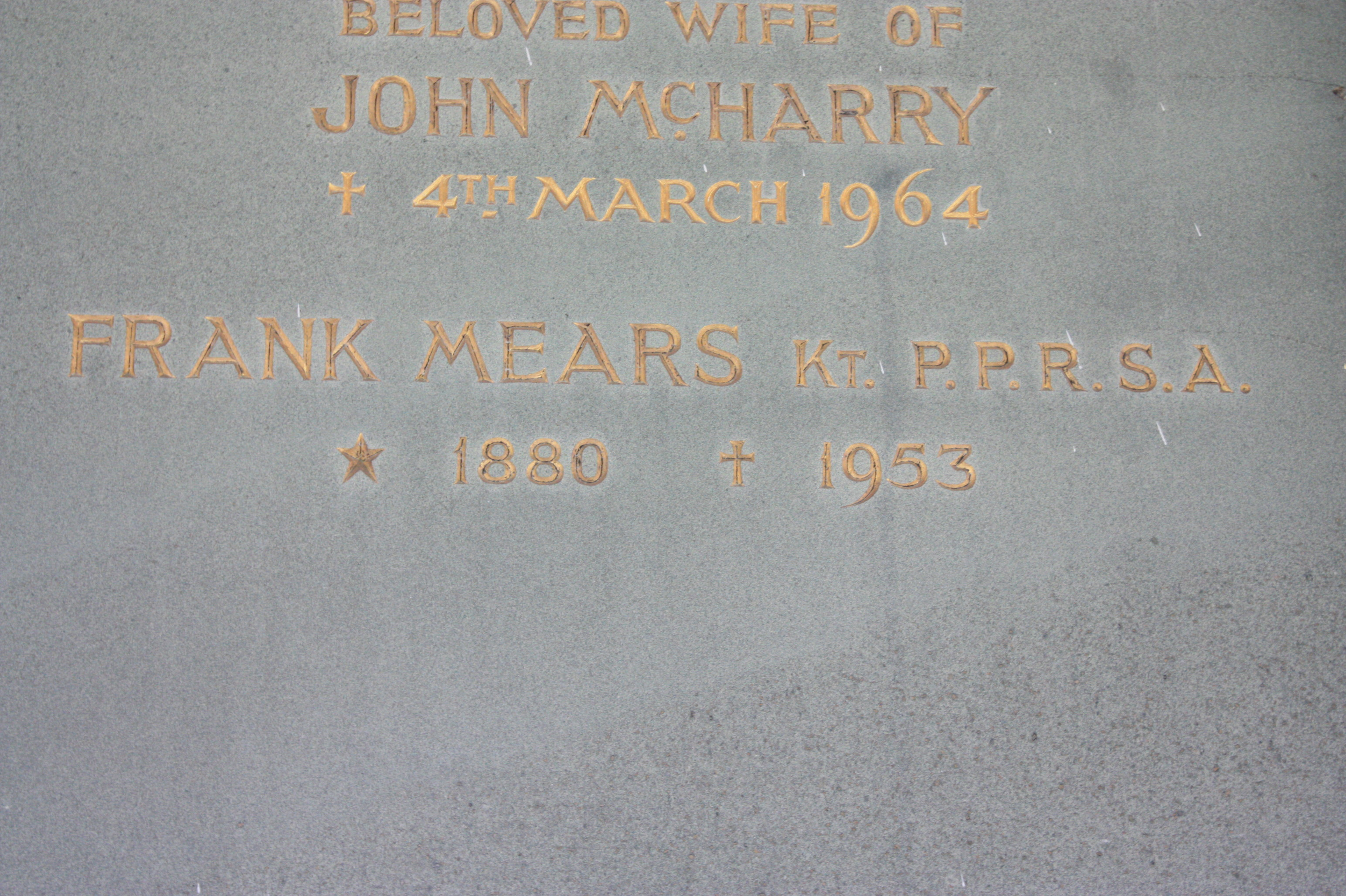
Memorial tablet to Frank Mears, Warriston Crematorium

Born in Tynemouth he moved to Edinburgh in 1897 when his father, Dr William Pope Mears (1855–1901), was appointed to a lecturing post in the Anatomy Department of Edinburgh University. His mother, Isabella Mears (née Bartholomew; 1853–1936), was one of the first licensed physicians in Scotland and an early Taoist author. The family lived at Woodburn House on Canaan Lane in the Morningside district of Edinburgh.

He trained as an architect, initially under Hippolyte Blanc (1896–1901), and then, in 1903, under Robert Weir Schultz (1860–1951). In 1906, after tours of England and the Continent, he returned to Scotland and worked under Ramsay Traquair (1874–1952). In 1908 he became an assistant to the pioneer planner Patrick Geddes (1854–1932), working on the Civic Survey of Edinburgh for the first ever Town Planning Exhibition (1910).

He worked with Geddes and his daughter Norah on the creation of a Scottish National Zoological Garden 1913–14 which became Edinburgh Zoo. In 1915 he married Norah Geddes, making Patrick Geddes his father-in-law.

In World War I he served with Geddes' son Alasdair in the Kite Balloon section of the Royal Flying Corps and, importantly, invented the modern parachute (and quick release buckle) whilst serving as a Major in this role.

Mears taught architecture at Edinburgh College of Art on a part-time basis from 1918. In 1925, he began lecturing on planning and, in 1932, founded a one-year postgraduate diploma course in Town and Country Planning.

He was elected an Associate of the Royal Scottish Academy in 1936, became full academician in 1943 and served as its President 1944–1950. The University of Edinburgh conferred an honorary doctorate (LLD) on him in 1945, and he was made a Knight Bachelor in the 1946 New Year Honours. He also advised the Department of Health on Housing in Scotland.

Frank Mears died in Christchurch, New Zealand whilst visiting his son, Kenneth Patrick Geddes Mears (1916–2001). His body was returned to Edinburgh for cremation. A memorial plaque is placed to his memory on the south side of Warriston Crematorium above a plaque to his other two sons both of whom died young: Alastair Mears (1918-1939) and John M. Mears (1921–1949).

== Hebrew University of Jerusalem ==
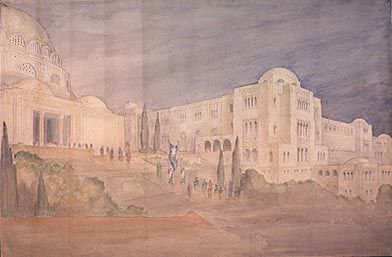
The Great Hall of the Hebrew University of Jerusalem, sketch by Frank Mears

In 1919, Patrick Geddes was engaged by the World Zionist Organization to prepare a scheme for the Hebrew University of Jerusalem. Frank Mears worked as his assistant, translating his ideas into plans and architectural drawings. Between 1925 and 1929, Mears worked with the Jerusalem-based architect, Benjamin Chaikin, on designs for specific university buildings, including the Einstein Institute of Mathematics and the David Wolffsohn Library.

== Greater Dublin reconstruction ==
Before the war, Mears had assisted Geddes with the mounting of the Cities and Town Planning Exhibition in Dublin and he subsequently worked with Dublin Corporation and the Irish Local Government Board on a number of schemes for garden villages in various parts of the city. Between 1922 and 1924, in the aftermath of the Irish Civil War, he prepared plans for civic renewal and the accommodation of new national institutions on behalf of the Greater Dublin Reconstruction Movement.

== Monuments and memorials ==
In the course of his career, Mears prepared a number of schemes for monuments and memorials. With Ramsay Traquair he prepared schemes for a memorial to Edward VII & I at the foot of the Canongate (1911) and the completion of the National Monument on Calton Hill (1912). In 1919 he submitted a proposal for a Scottish National War Memorial as Via Sacra following the line of Johnston Terrace on the southern slope of the Edinburgh Castle Rock. In 1926, Mears was engaged to prepare a scheme for a National Memorial to David Livingstone at Livingstone's birthplace in Blantyre. A series of relief tableaux and a World Fountain were devised in collaboration with the sculptor, Charles d'Orville Pilkington Jackson. In 1950, Mears worked with his partners, H.A. Rendel Govan and Robert J. Naismith, and Pilkington Jackson on the design for the monument to his old regiment, the Royal Scots, in Princes Street Gardens, Edinburgh.

== Rural development ==
Mears was keenly interested in rural issues and in 1926 he played a key role in the establishment of the Association for the Preservation of Rural Scotland (APRS). He was critical of the insensitivity of the Ministry of Transport's proposal to drive a modern trunk road through Glencoe and, in response to representations by the APRS, the Ministry agreed to face its engineering works in Glencoe in local stone and to respect the local land form in its designs for road improvements throughout the Highlands. In 1930, Mears and Charles Denny Carus-Wilson were appointed consultant architects for five new road bridges on the A82: over the River Kiachnish (1932) between North Ballachulish and Fort William; and over the River Oich and at Invergarry (1932), at Invermoriston (1933) and at Fort Augustus (1935) in the Great Glen. In 1935, Mears was appointed consultant architect for a new crossing of the River Dee at Allenvale in Aberdeen, to relieve congestion on the historic Brig o Dee upstream. Work began on his design for a three-span reinforced concrete bridge faced in Kemnay granite in 1938 and the new crossing was opened as the George VI Bridge in 1941.

In 1932, Mears and Leslie Grahame Thomson prepared model designs for rural houses on behalf of the APRS. 71 cottages to their design were built in Roxburghshire. Mears also prepared plans and designs for a number of housing schemes in Peebles, including developments at Neidpath Road (1935) and Connor Street (1936). In 1933, Mears and Carus-Wilson were engaged to design the Lucy Sanderson Cottage Homes, an early sheltered housing development in Galashiels.

Towards the end of his career, Mears addressed the problem of rural depopulation in its most acute form in a strategy for the planning and redevelopment of the County of Sutherland. In a plan strongly influenced by Frank Fraser Darling's Preliminary Report on the West Highland Survey (1948), he advocated a strategy based on the regeneration of the crofting economy through measures such as land rehabilitation, tenure reform, investment in agriculture, forestry and fishing, and the encouragement of small rural industries based on indigenous resources.

== The development of Edinburgh ==
In 1931 he prepared a "Plan for Edinburgh" and in 1935 founded the first Town Planning course at the Edinburgh College of Art whilst Head of the School. Drawing on the work he had undertaken for the Civic Survey of Edinburgh, he wrote a number of articles on the planning of medieval settlements and the development of Edinburgh from Roman times.

== Central and South-East Scotland ==
In 1943, Mears was asked to prepare a regional plan for catchments of the Rivers Forth and Tweed. His Interim Report on Population Trends in March 1945 identified sharply contrasting challenges in the two catchments. Future developments indicated in the Report of the Scottish Coalfields Committee at the end of 1944 suggested that, in anticipation of a large increase in population, the problem in the Forth Basin would be to find sites for a number of large new communities without overwhelming existing towns, while avoiding as far as possible good agricultural land and areas liable to subsidence. In the Tweed Valley the problem was not so much one of "town" planning as of discovering ways of arresting the decline in population by the provision of improved housing and social facilities where these were lacking, and by the introduction of balancing industries to supplement those of agriculture and weaving. The Regional Plan for Central and South-East Scotland, one of three major regional plans for Scotland's post-war reconstruction, was published in 1948.

== Greenock redevelopment ==
In 1940, Mears was appointed planning consultant to the Corporation of Greenock. In a plan entitled Greenock: Portal of the Clyde (1947) he argued that the scale and character of future housing development, social facilities and services should reflect the industrial potential offered by the town's strategic location on the Firth of Clyde. Patrick Abercrombie's Clyde Valley planning team had identified a serious deficiency of open spaces in the lower part of the town. Mears proposed redevelopment at lower densities, the creation of new industrial areas and the accommodation of the displaced population in a constellation of new neighbourhoods laid out in the Kip Valley on American Parkway lines to create a "federal Garden City". He also prepared layouts and designs for council housing in Greenock and a scheme for the redevelopment of part of the town centre which had been badly damaged by wartime bombing. His work in the burgh was the subject of a documentary film entitled Greenock Plans Ahead (1948), directed by the photographer Hamilton Tait and narrated by Frank Phillips.

== University of Glasgow ==
In 1951, Mears submitted proposals for the expansion and redevelopment of the University of Glasgow. His scheme involved a major expansion to the north of University Avenue into Hillhead, with new buildings arranged around a system of courts and quadrangles and linked by tree-lined footpaths.

== Projects ==
Mears was employed across Scotland and was also involved in significant projects in Ireland and Palestine:

- Master plan and designs for new buildings for the Hebrew University of Jerusalem (1919–1929)
  - The David Wolffsohn University and National Library, Hebrew University, Jerusalem. Design by Patrick Geddes, Frank Mears and Benjamin Chaikin, inaugurated on 15 April 1930.
  - The Einstein Institute of Mathematics, Wattenberg Hall, Hebrew University, Jerusalem. Design by Frank Mears and Benjamin Chaikin, inaugurated on 31 October 1928.
- Greater Dublin Reconstruction (1922–1924)
- The Scottish National Memorial to David Livingstone (1926–1935)
- New road bridges on the A82 (1930–1935)
- Proposals for Central Edinburgh (1931)
- Rural house designs for the APRS (1932)
- Housing schemes in Peebles (1932–1935)
- The Lucy Sanderson Cottage Homes in Galashiels (1933)
- County Planning in East Lothian (1933–1950)
- George VI Bridge, Aberdeen (1935–1941)
- Renewal of Stirling's Old Town (1936–1953)
- County Planning in Midlothian (1937–1941)
- Planning proposals for Elgin (1938–1944)
- Plan for the Redevelopment of Greenock (1940–1947)
- Central and South-East Scotland Plan (1943–1948)
- Monument to the Royal Scots Regiment (1950–1952)
- Proposals for the University of Glasgow (1951)
- Planning and Redevelopment in Sutherland (1951)

== Online references ==
- Frank Mears pages on the website of Graeme Purves
- http://discovery.nationalarchives.gov.uk/SearchUI/Details?uri=C2987551
