= Action to Protect Rural Scotland =

Charity in Scotland

Action to Protect Rural Scoltand
- Abbreviation: APRS
- Predecessor: Association for the Preservation of Rural Scoltand
- Formation: 1927
- Type: Charitable organisation
- Registration no.: Registered charity number: SC016139
- Headquarters: Augustine United Church, 41 George IV Bridge, Edinburgh, EH1 1EL
- Region served: Scotland
- President: Patricia Macdonald
- Director: Kat Jones
- Website: www.aprs.scot

Action to Protect Rural Scotland, more commonly known as APRS, is a charity in Scotland that campaigns to protect Scotland's countryside and rural landscapes.

APRS campaigns on a range of issues relating to the countryside in Scotland, including national parks, green belts, and the circular economy.

APRS was formerly known as the Association for the Preservation of Rural Scotland, but changed its name in 2023.

== History ==
Discussions to establish APRS began in December 1926 when the architect and planner Frank Mears published a letter in the Scotsman calling for an organisation to be set up in Scotland with similar objectives to the Council for the Preservation of Rural England (CPRE), which had held its first meeting earlier that year. The inaugural meeting of what would become the Association for the Preservation of Rural Scotland took place in Spring 1927.

=== National Trust for Scotland ===
In 1929 APRS were offered the Loch Dee estate for purchase, but under the terms of its constitution it did not have the power to own land. The issue was discussed with the National Trust, but it was decided that Scotland should have its own organisation. APRS council decided at a meeting in July 1930 to proceed with establishing a separate organisation in Scotland, having decided not to expand the remit of APRS to enable it to hold land. The National Trust for Scotland would be officially incorporated on 1 May 1931.

=== National Parks ===
APRS played a central role in early campaigns for National Parks in Scotland. Proposals to establish a National Park in Scotland were first discussed in the pages of Scots Magazine, beginning with an article by the access campaigner Ernest A. Baker in 1928.

The discussion on Scots Magazine prompted APRS to organise a conference on national parks on 4 June 1929. The Conference would lead to the establishment of a 'Scottish Forest Reserve Committee', which would later propose establishing a National Trust body in Scotland.

APRS would later establish the Scottish Council on National Parks in 1942.

=== Hydro schemes ===
In the 1920s and 1930s APRS was involved in campaigns against various hydro schemes in the north of Scotland which had been proposed by private companies. One of those, the Grampain Scheme, would have involved the "obliteration" of the Falls of Glomach, another scheme proposed the diversion of waters from many glens north of the Great Glen in order to supply a large hydro power station which would have been built at Kinloch Hourn.

== Campaigns ==
=== National Parks ===
APRS are involved in campaigning for additional National Parks in Scotland, working closely with the Scottish Campaign for National Parks (SCNP). The organisation supported proposals for a third Scottish National Park in Galloway before the plans were dropped by the Scottish Government in 2025.

=== Circular Economy ===
APRS have been working on the Circular Economy as part of its ‘Have you Got the Bottle’ campaign since 2015. As part of this campaign APRS has argued for a deposit return scheme in Scotland. A planned scheme in Scotland was cancelled in 2023.

=== Green Belts ===
Action to Protect Rural Scotland (APRS) has campaigned for the protection and enhancement of Scotland’s designated green belts. Their work involves producing guidance (such as their Green Belts Advice Note), supporting community campaigners through the “Green Belts Alliance”, and intervening in planning processes to protect green-belt land from piecemeal erosion and unsustainable development.

== See also ==
- CPRE, The Countryside Charity
- Campaign for the Protection of Rural Wales
- National Trust for Scotland
