= Early life of John Milton =

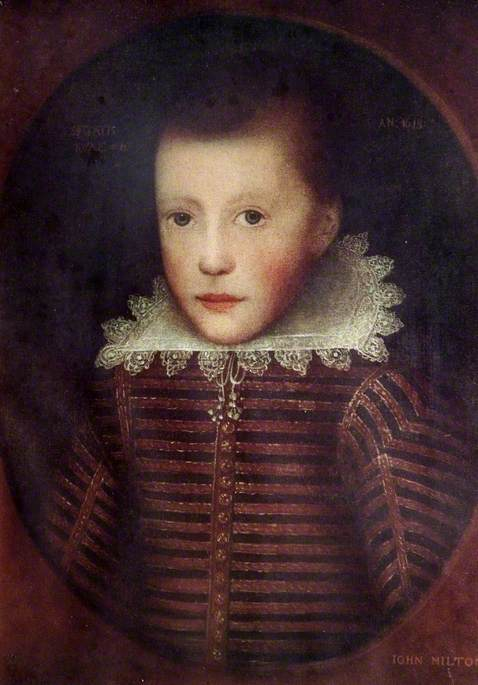
John Milton at age 10 by Cornelis Janssens van Ceulen

John Milton wrote poetry during the English Renaissance. He was born on 9 December 1608 to John and Sara Milton. Only three of their children survived infancy. Anne was the oldest, John was the middle child, and Christopher was the youngest.

John Milton was educated under a strong Protestant influence and attended Christ's College, Cambridge, with the intention of pursuing a career as a minister. During his college years, Milton produced his poems L'Allegro and Il Penseroso. After leaving Cambridge, Milton changed his mind about his future, and hesitated during many years of study. Instead, he spent time composing poetry, which led to the production of the dramatic verse of Arcades and Comus.

After the death of his mother, Milton left England to tour Europe. Upon returning, Milton was brought into the realm of political writing and he began a career composing political tracts which put forth his views on state and religious matters. He first supported the presbyterian leaders who were lining up in England behind Stephen Marshall; a few years later he would promote more radical views.

== Parents ==
Milton's parents were John Milton, Sr. (1562–1647), a composer and scrivener, and his wife Sara Jeffrey (1572–1637). John Milton, Sr.'s business owned many properties and was involved in making loans. He was from a yeoman family and was raised in Oxford, where he trained as a chorister. However, when Richard Milton, his father and a staunch Roman Catholic, discovered that John Milton, Sr. had Protestant leanings, he disinherited his son. John Milton, Sr., left for London and became a scrivener apprentice in 1583. Little is known about Sara Jeffrey besides the fact that Paul Jeffrey, her father, was a tailor and her mother Ellen lived with the Miltons until her death in 1611. The two married around 1600 and buried an unnamed child on 12 May 1601.

John Milton, Sr., ran his business from his home on Bread Street. He was constantly at work, and only took a partial day off the day his son was born. In 1633, John Milton, Sr. became warden for the Chapel of St Paul. He continued his job as a scrivener until 1636, when he left the Company of Scriveners's Court of Assistants and he moved his family from Hammersmith to Horton. While not working as a scrivener, John Milton, Sr. composed music, which brought him into a close relationship with other musicians and composers including Henry Lawes, who proved influential in commissioning the young Milton's masques. At least twenty of Milton Sr.'s compositions survived, and most of them contain a religious theme. His works were published in many collections, including Thomas Morley's Triumphs of Oriana (1601), William Leighton's The Tears or Lamentations of a Sorrowful Soul (1612) and Thomas Ravenscroft's The Whole Book of Psalms (1621), amongst others. He also composed poetry, and two poems, never published, are known to have existed: a sonnet and a poem dedicated to John Lane.

== Childhood ==
Milton was born 6:30 a.m. on Friday 9 December 1608, in Cheapside, London along Bread Street, near St. Paul's Cathedral. He was baptised at All Hallows Church on 20 December 1608. At the time of Milton's birth, his father was 46 and mother 36. He had one older sister Anne; her date of birth is unknown. Milton had three younger siblings: Christopher, baptised 3 December 1615; Sara, baptised 15 July 1612 and died 6 August 1612; and Tabitha, baptised 30 January 1614 and died 3 August 1615.

Milton attended church at All Hallows and was influenced by the minister Richard Stock, a Puritan who was anti-Catholic and emphasised the need to read the Bible. In addition to his time at church, he spent most of his early life near St. Paul's Cathedral and was privately tutored. From the ages of 5 and 7, Milton was taught how to read and write in English and Latin, along with arithmetic. Milton was provided with several tutors between the ages of 7 and 12, but one in particular, Thomas Young, would prove influential. Young was a Scottish Presbyterian who had moved south, was highly educated and respected by his peers. Young's religious views affected Milton, and he adopted both Puritan appearances and ideas during his tutoring. Young was not the only major figure in Milton's early education; Milton acknowledged his father's care in teaching him many languages, including French, Italian, and Hebrew.

After a few years, he was sent to St. Paul's School, which was run by Alexander Gil, William Sound, and Oliver Smythe. Gil had a reputation for scholarship in Greek, Latin, and theology. He was also a proponent of English grammar structures and relied on poetry, including that written by Edmund Spenser and Philip Sidney, to discuss the English language. Milton travelled each day between school and home, and his path took him by St Paul's. It is possible that he listened to the sermons put on during this time by John Donne. John Aubrey, in Brief Lives, quotes his brother Christopher to describe how Milton spent his time: "When he went to school, when he was very young, he studied very hard and sat up very late, commonly till twelve or one o'clock at night; and his father ordered the main to sit up for him". Milton later attributed his blindness, in his Defensio Secunda, to the rigorous study that he undertook during this time.

There is little evidence about Milton's time at St. Paul's, because the school's records were lost in a fire during the late 17th century. The actual date of Milton's start at the school is uncertain, further than estimate in the range from 1615 to 1622. According to accounts by Edward Phillips, Milton's nephew, and by Christopher Milton, Milton started at the school during his earliest years. However, Phillips states that Milton went to school with his brother, which ambiguous phrasing pushes the date to 1622. Milton, in his Defensio Secunda, claims that he began his deeper studies at the age of 12, which places the date after 1620. While at the school, Milton befriended Charles Diodati, and the two kept up a regular correspondence of letters and poetry. It is certain that the friendship was established Diodati before Diodati left to study at Oxford in early 1623.

Milton composed his first hymn in 1623, and, in 1624, his earliest completed poem, "A Paraphrase on Psalm 114". "A Paraphrase on Psalm 114" describes how the Jews were led by God out of Egypt, the miracle of the parting of the Red Sea, and their eventual arrival in Canaan. The psalm emphasises the importance of the father figure and serves as an early model for the relationship between father and son in Milton's later works, including Paradise Lost (God and Son) and Samson Agonistes (Manoa and Samson).

== College ==
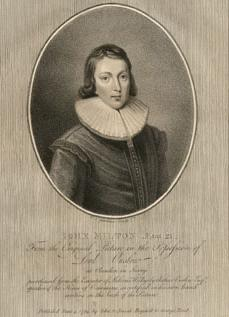
John Milton at age 21 by William Gardiner

On 12 February 1625, Milton was admitted into Christ's College, Cambridge as a minor pensioner. Christ's under Thomas Bainbrigg, Master from 1622, was harmonious on religious questions, a great contrast to the situation some years earlier when Valentine Carey had clashed with William Ames, and the fellowship of 13 included a range of views. Milton matriculated on 9 April 1625 with William Chappell as his tutor. He intended, according to the Subscription Book, to become a minister, and his course of study at Cambridge was based around this vocation. More of Milton's studies at Cambridge is unknown, but he did begin to study with Chappell, who was a respected scholar and became a staunch Arminian and Laudian. Milton would have attended lectures by Samuel Collins, Robert Creighton, and Robert Metcalfe, in addition to hearing Richard Sibbes and George Herbert preach. The Fellow of Christ's with the greatest reputation for his contemporaries was Joseph Mede, but it has not been shown that he had personal influence on Milton. It has been argued that Milton later took from Mede's writings some conceptions on the millennium.

When the plague hit England in August 1625, the University of Cambridge had to be shut down until December. Milton had been there only for a few months before he had an altercation with Chappell and he was rusticated by this time. It is possible that the conflict originated in Chappell's Arminianism conflicting with Milton's Calvinistic views. He was suspended temporarily from the college, and returned to London from April to July 1625. During this period, Milton composed many of his earlier poems; his poems on the Gunpowder Plot, his Hobson poems, and his An Epitaph on the Marchioness of Winchester were written while working on various college exercises. Other poems, such as On the Morning of Christ's Nativity or On Time, Upon the Circumcision, and At a Solemn Music, were written during Milton's free time.

When Milton returned in 1626, he changed his tutor, because Chappell had wanted Milton removed from the college completely. His new tutor, Nathaniel Tovey, was a friend to both Diodati's family and to Chappell, which eased the personal problems. Tovey's views were Calvinist, and he was a Ramist in logic, a style followed later by Milton in his Art of Logic. Milton spent time writing Latin verse with other students, including Elegy II, which honoured Richard Ridding after his death 26 September 1626. Another elegy was written for the vice-chancellor, John Gostlin, who died on 21 October 1626. In the poem, Milton relies on Horatian poetics. The poem was placed first among the Latin poems in his 1645 collection. It is possible that the work was partly from an early poem that was then expanded in memory of Gostlin. In Elegy III, Milton honours Lancelot Andrewes, the Bishop of Winchester, who died 25 September 1626. In the poem, he also honours two others, whose deaths compounded his time of mourning, and the many Protestants who died during the Thirty Years War.

He received a bachelor's degree in 1629. In 1630, Milton composed "On Shakespeare". The poem became the first poem of Milton's to be published, and it was including anonymously in the Second Folio of Shakespeare's Works. During this time, Milton began composing a series of love-sonnets, with seven of the poems written during his college years and a final set of three written after 1642. In 1632, he received a master of arts degree. He graduated cum laude, but the route into academia was blocked to him by the Christ's College statutes, there already being a Fellow of London origins, Michael Honywood.

== Early writing ==
After graduating from Cambridge, Milton returned to live with his parents in Hammersmith, for a long "studious retirement". During this period, extending from 1630 to 1638, Milton hesitated over a career and composed his Arcades, A Mask (better known as Comus, a title it acquired only in 1738 at the hands of John Dalton), and Lycidas.

Both Arcades and A Mask Presented at Ludlow Castle, 1634 were masques commissioned by the family of John Egerton, 1st Earl of Bridgewater through the influence of Lawes, the Earl's music tutor for his children. Arcades was written to honour Alice Spencer, Countess Dowager of Derby, and performed on her estate at Harefield west of London; the date is debated, perhaps in October 1632 as the family tried to put behind it the scandal of the execution of her son-in-law Mervyn Tuchet, 2nd Earl of Castlehaven for sexual offences, or on her 75th birthday, 4 May 1634. A Mask was performed for Michaelmas eve, 29 September 1634, at Ludlow Castle, the Earl of Bridgewater's residence. This masque differed in some ways from other masques of the time, in that it was longer and did not rely as much on music. The text was revised and published in 1638. Milton was a theatre-goer in his youth, as he mentions in Elegy I, and his dramatic work on masques, though the genre was closely associated with court entertainments, has been seen as suggestive of a reforming rather than a negative attitude to drama, in contrast to militant critics such as William Prynne from the Puritan side.

Milton's family moved out west from Hammersmith to Horton during 1636, further into the English countryside. In November 1638, Milton wrote Lycidas and the work was published in a collection of other memorial works for Edward King, who had attended Christ's College with Milton, published that year. While Milton knew King, who had been elected to a fellowship, it is not clear they were close friends. Lycidas is a thoughtful elegy in the pastoral style, and it appeared over the initials J.M.

== Travels in Europe ==
In April 1637, Sara Milton died, and Milton used the opportunity to distance himself from his family. After money was provided for the care of his father, now retired, Milton left to tour Europe in May 1638. This early "Grand Tour" of France, Italy and Switzerland lasted until either July or August 1639. While they did not follow the later model of tutelage and instruction for a young man of good financial position straight from university, Milton's travels brought him directly to the urban centres of Europe from a life in semi-rural Horton; and Milton was exposed to various artistic and religious traditions, especially the Catholic world, and current political thought. He also met numerous celebrated theorists and intellectuals to whom he was able to display his poetic skills. As to specific details, only a general account is preserved, and there is just one major source: Milton's own Defensio Secunda. Although there are other records, some letters, some mentions in his other prose tracts and the rest, the bulk of the information therefore comes from a work that, according to Barbara Lewalski, "was not intended as autobiography but as rhetoric, designed to emphasize his sterling reputation with the learned of Europe." However, many of the major events can still be pieced together from various documents.

He travelled a standard route relied on by other Englishmen touring Europe at the time. He first went to Calais and then on to Paris, riding horseback. He had brought a letter from diplomat Henry Wotton which allowed him to be introduced at the British embassy. From ambassador John Scudamore, Milton received other letters of introduction, and they proved their value as he received assistance from other Englishmen along his travels and met important individuals. Scudamore introduced him directly to Hugo Grotius, whom Milton called "a most learned man" and one "I ardently desired to meet" Grotius was a Dutch jurist and major philosopher of law, playwright and poet; he was a defender of Arminianism and believer in religious toleration, and his views on theology and politics were in some ways similar to Milton's own. However, Milton quickly left France after this meeting, after visiting a few landmarks including the Louvre and Notre Dame de Paris; Cyriack Skinner, his assistant, explains that Milton did not appreciate the French regime, under the control of Louis XIII and Cardinal Richelieu, who were anti-Huguenot.

In [Florence], which I have always admired above all others because of the elegance, not just of its tongue, but also of its wit, I lingered for about two months. There I at once became the friend of many gentlemen eminent in rank and learning, whose private academies I frequented – a Florentine institution which deserves great praise not only for promoting humane studies but also for encouraging friendly intercourse. Time will never destroy my recollection – ever welcome and delightful – of you, Jacopo Gaddi, Carol Dati, Frescobaldi, Coltellini, Buonmattei, Chimetelli, Francini, and many others.

– Milton's account of Florence in Defensio Secunda

Milton travelled south to Nice and then on to Genoa. He then journeyed to Livorno and Pisa, seeing the Leaning Tower. He reached Florence around July 1638 and stayed there until September. While there, Milton enjoyed many of the sites and structures of the city. He also met many intellectuals and attended social and artistic events. He enjoyed spending time in the Florentine academies that claimed to operate in a similar fashion to Plato's Symposium. In particular, Milton probably visited the Florentine Academy and the Academia della Crusca along with smaller academies in the area including the Apastisti, operated by Milton's friend Carlo Dati, and the Svogliati, operated by Jacopo Gaddi. While at the Svogliati, Milton read some of his Neo-Latin poetry. His candour of manner and erudite neo-Latin poetry made him many friends in Florentine intellectual circles, and he met a number of famous and influential people through these connections including the astronomer Galileo at Arcetri, Benedetto Buonmattei, Antonio Malatesti, and others. Although Milton enjoyed himself in Florence, he left in September to continue onward to Rome.

Now with many connections from Florence, Milton had easy access to Rome's intellectual circles, including groups like the Fantastici. His poetic abilities impressed such as Giovanni Salzilli, who honoured Milton in an epigram; this praise was later mentioned in the preface to the Latin portion of Milton's Poems of 1645. In return for this poetic generosity, Milton returned the favour in his Latin Ad Salzillum, which discusses his own merits and laments that Salzilli was ill at the time. In late October, Milton, despite his dislike for the Society of Jesus, attended a dinner given by the English College, Rome, meeting English Catholics who were also guests, theologian Henry Holden and the poet Patrick Cary. There is little else known about this time beyond that he met David Codner, an English Benedictine with court connections, who also praised Milton's poetry, and that he attended various musical events, including oratorios, operas, and melodramas. Milton left for Naples near the end of November and he stayed only for a month, finding that Spanish control diminished the local intellectual and artistic community. He was introduced to Giovanni Battista Manso, patron to both Torquato Tasso and to Giovanni Battista Marino. Manso became Milton's guide through Naples and gifted Milton with books and a distich that teases Milton through Gregory the Great's pun on "Angle" and "angel" when describing the English. Milton responded in his Mansus that he was grateful for the gesture of good will and claims Manso as his patron.

Milton had wanted to travel to Sicily and then on to Greece; but he started to retrace his steps, and after lingering on the way home he returned to England during the summer of 1639. He claimed in Defensio Secunda that his plans were changed by "sad tidings of civil war in England."

As I was on the point of returning to Rome, I was warned by merchants that they had learned through letters of plots laid against me by the English Jesuits, should I return to Rome, because of the freedom with which I had spoken about religion.

– Milton on the plot against him in Defensio Secunda

It is possible, as he wrote later, that he was warned by a group of merchants that there was a plot to murder him if he was to re-enter Rome. This claim could be merely an exaggeration to reinforce himself as a defender of Protestantism. However, Milton's theological frankness did limit what Manso could do for him as patron. A lingering reputation is suggested by what Nicolaas Heinsius, a Dutch poet, later wrote: "That Englishman was hated by the Italians, among whom he lived a long time, on account of his over-strict morals, because he both disputed freely about religion, and on any occasion whatever prated very bitterly against the Roman Pontiff." Regardless, these were all points that Milton later took pride in. He actually spent two months in Rome on his return journey.

He arrived in time to experience Carnival and its festivities. Also, Milton met Lukas Holste, a Vatican librarian, and was given a personal tour through the library and its vast collection of books and manuscripts. Through Holste, Milton was also introduced to Cardinal Francesco Barberini, and was able to view the opera Chi soffre speri, hosted by the Cardinal. Milton later praised Barberini, steering away from theological subjects. He also experienced a concert of Leonora Baroni, writing a few Latin epigrams in tribute. Around March, Milton travelled once again to Florence and stayed there for two months. While there, he attended further meetings of the academies and spent time with the friends that he made on his previous visit. After leaving Florence, he travelled to Lucca and passed through Bologna and Ferrara along the way.

He stopped in Venice for a month and experienced various operates and other theatrical and musical events. Venice also showed him a Republican form of government that he later admired as promoting freedom. While in Italy, Milton's childhood friend, Diodati, had died. Milton composed an elegy in memory of Diodati, and included a headnote saying that they "had pursued the same studies" and that they were the "most intimate friends from childhood on". It took Milton seven months in all to return finally to England, with the trip extended from Venice as he visited Giovanni Diodati, his friend's uncle, in Geneva. There he encountered Calvinism in power and another model republic. He was introduced to the various scholars and theologians of the region. From Switzerland, Milton travelled to Paris and then to Calais before finally arriving in England in either July or August 1639.

== Published author ==
His tour over, Milton within two years found roles and independence in teaching and controversy. By the summer of 1642, which also marked the outbreak of the First English Civil War, he felt ready to marry. Milton's early poetry, written from 1624 onwards, was eventually published in December 1645. This work contained both Milton's English poetry and his Latin poetry. Only three poems were not included, but they were eventually introduced into the 1673 edition of the poems. The frontispiece of the work, by William Marshall, depicted Milton at the age of 21.

Milton returned to England, in late 1639, in the interlude between the two Bishops' Wars. Rather than living with his father, he found accommodation of his own in London, and began tutoring. He lived for a year near St Bride's Church, and moved in 1640 a short way to Aldersgate, just outside the City proper. His first pupils were his young nephews, Edward Phillips and John Phillips, sons of his sister Anne and both later known as writers. Milton's 1644 intervention Of Education in debate on pedagogy is based on his practical experience, as well as stating his own relationship to humanist tradition. At this period he was casting around for a literary project, compiling long lists of possible Biblical and historical topics, abandoning the idea of an Arthurian work and considering subjects mainly in a dramatic light.

Political events now began to unfold rapidly; and controversial publications, particularly on episcopacy, sprang up in a pamphleteering battle. During his early years, Milton had been placed under Thomas Young for tutoring. Now 30 years later, Young was one of five clerics of presbyterian views who formed Smectymnuus. The group, titled after a combination of each contributor's initials, wrote on antiprelatical matters, and Young encouraged Milton to write his first prose work, Of Reformation (1641), to aid in their cause. In all, Milton's antiprelatical tracts amounted to five pamphlets written in the space of a year. Of these, only the fourth carried his name, but he took on easily the role of polemicist, both lofty and resorting to low gibes and scurrility.

At the same time as the final pamphlet of the series, May 1642, Milton married Marie Powell (see John Milton's relationships). The marriage was short-lived, as the First English Civil War broke out, for reasons not fully explained, but set off Milton's divorce tracts, another polemical series of pamphlets beginning in 1643. Milton's advocacy of divorce pushed him away from Puritan orthodoxy, and led on to Areopagitica of 1644 against censorship, his most lasting prose work.
