= Of Reformation =

1641 pamphlet by John Milton

Of Reformation is a 1641 pamphlet by John Milton, and his debut in the public arena. Its full title is Of Reformation Touching Church-Discipline in England.

== Background ==
This work was followed by four others, also related to church hierarchy and Presbyterianism. Christopher Hill considers that Milton was somewhat influenced, in the series, by the style of the pamphleteer Martin Marprelate, back in print; and notes that the timing in May 1641 was in the same month as the execution of Thomas Wentworth, 1st Earl of Strafford, and the fall of William Laud, Archbishop of Canterbury. Further, Hill points out Milton's "special interest in the cultural and moral consequences, as he saw them, of episcopacy."

The work was Milton's first independently produced work, and was published in May 1641 under the title Of Reformation Touching Church-Discipline in England: And the Cavses that hitherto have hindered it. The first page offers an alternate title, "Of Reformation in England".

== Tract ==
In Of Reformation, Milton relies on the concept of a body to serve as a metaphor for his analysis of religion. He believes that the Reformation would allow for a structuring of the body to something more perfect, and that the Gospel was:

refin'd to such a Spirituall height, and temper of purity, and knowledge of the Creator, that the body, with all the circumstances of time and place, were purif'd by the affections of the regenerat Soule, and nothing left impure, but sinne; Faith needing not the weak, and fallible office of the Senses, to be either the Ushers, or Interpreters, of heavenly Mysteries, save where our Lord himselfe in his Sacraments ordain'd.

The purity, metaphorically speaking, removed any physical aspects and allowed for a direct relationship between soul and spiritual truth. Any interference between the two, especially in the form of a mediating force such as a church government or a liturgy, would hinder this connection. When individuals push for a religious structure, they try to make the individual metaphorically physical so:

that they might bring the inward acts of the Spirit to the outward, and customary ey-Service of the body, as if they could make God earthly, and fleshly, because they could not make themselves heavenly, and Spirituall: they began to draw downe all the Divine intercours, betwixt God, and the Soule, yea, the very shape of God himselfe, into an exterior, and bodily forme.

Although God does have a shape, he is without a physical body and his existence is above human perception. Any attempt to force him into a bodily form, or emphasising bodily forms is a corruption and a failure of the individual, and the Reformation's primary purpose was to restore our ideas to their proper place, i.e. to remove these physical conceptions. Furthermore, truth comes to the individual through scripture, not through liturgy, and, as Milton argues: "The very essence of Truth is plainnesse, and brightnes; the darknes and crookednesse is our own. The Wisdome of God created understanding, fit and proportionable to Truth the object, and end of it, as the eye to the thing visible ." He also attacks many of the Church Fathers, accusing them of "the ridiculous wresting of Scripture". He also attacks that the Anglican/Episcopal tradition was supported by "canary-sucking and swan-eating" individuals.

Milton's argument did not just discuss church government but discussed the concept of government as a whole. In an argument that was based partly on the writings of Polybius and Thomas Smith's The Commonwealth of England, Milton declares the importance of republicanism:

the best founded Commonwealths, and least barbarous have aym'd at a certain mixture and temperament, partaking the severall vertues of each other State, that each part drawing to it selfe may keep up a steddy and eev'n uprightnesse in common. There is no Civill Government that hath beene known, no not the Spartan, not the Roman, though both for this respect so much prais'd by the wise Polybius, more divinely and harmoniously tun'd, more equally ballanc'd as it were by the hand and scale of Justice, then is the Commonwealth of England: where under a free, and untutor'd Monarch, the noblest, worthiest, and most prudent men, with full approbation, and suffrage of the People have in their power the supreame, and finall determination of highest Affaires.

In Book II, Milton discusses "Tale of the Wen", which describes the relationship of the Body with its other aspects. The Wen tries to emphasise its own importance over the other parts of the body until a Philosopher is brought to discuss the Wen. The Wen, according to the Philosopher, is a parasite that will be revealed as a parasite "when I have cut thee off". However, the Philosopher, in the story, never removes the Wen and it continues to be present through the rest of the Book. Milton uses the images to emphasise the need for healing, and argues that the church government, especially the bishops, are the same kind of parasite that interferes with the body. Milton extends the metaphor towards the idea of commonwealth as a whole:

And because things simply pure are inconsistent in the masse of nature, nor are the elements or humor in Mans Body exactly homogeneal, and hence the best founded Commonwealths, and least barbarous have aym'd at a certain mixture and temperament, partaking the several virtues of each other

== Themes ==
Milton opposed the concept of the establishment of a central Church government. He believed that individual congregations should govern themselves. His view of how bishops would burn in hell is connected to themes originating in his poem On the Morning of Christ's Nativity. According to C. A. Patrides, it "combines a serene assurance that an appeal to reason would prove decisive, with an apocalyptic persuasion that the Primal Reason could hardly fail to intervene on behalf of so just a cause as Milton's."

Parts of Of Reformation emphasise a conflict present within Milton: he believed that the act of writing the work would take away from the spiritual connection between an individual and God. The physicality of writing interferes with the soul, and that any appeal would be to the physical senses and possibly not to the spiritual. In essence, the church is corrupted whore who "out of question from her pervers conceiting of God, and holy things, she has faln to beleeve no God at all.

== See also ==
- Of Prelatical Episcopacy (1641)
- Animadversions (1641)
- The Reason of Church-Government Urged against Prelaty (1642)
- Apology for Smectymnuus (1642)
- Of True Religion (1673)
