= Methought I Saw my Late Espoused Saint =

Sonnet XXIII: Methought I saw my late espoused saint

Methought I saw my late espoused saint
Brought to me, like Alcestis, from the grave,
Whom Jove's great son to her glad husband gave,
Rescu'd from death by force, though pale and faint.
Mine, as whom wash'd from spot of child-bed taint
Purification in the old Law did save,
And such as yet once more I trust to have
Full sight of her in Heaven without restraint,
Came vested all in white, pure as her mind;
Her face was veil'd, yet to my fancied sight
Love, sweetness, goodness, in her person shin'd
So clear as in no face with more delight.
But Oh! as to embrace me she inclin'd,
I wak'd, she fled, and day brought back my night.

"Methought I Saw my Late Espoused Saint" is the first line of a sonnet by the English poet John Milton, typically designated as Sonnet XXIII and thus referred to by scholars. The poem recounts a dream vision in which the speaker saw his wife return to him (as the dead Alcestis appeared to her husband Admetus), only to see her disappear again as day comes. There is considerable discussion among scholars as to which of his first two wives Milton could refer to. Samuel Johnson, in the Lives of the Most Eminent English Poets, suggests his second wife, Katherine Woodcock, and comments that "her husband honoured her memory with a poor sonnet".

== Content ==
The influence of Giovanni della Casa's sonnets is recognized as an influence on all of Milton's sonnets; critics discern della Casa's "deliberate [break] with the Petrarchan tradition of regularity and smoothness". Sonnet XXIII combines two traditions, with its argument developing in the way of the English sonnet (in quatrains and a couplet) while its rhyme scheme follows the Italian form. The poem drives much of its strength from the opposition of day and night, made explicit in the last line (the pairing is discussed by Leo Spitzer in comparison with a Latin poem by Iovianus Pontanus).

== Structure and meaning ==
Leo Spitzer in 1951 was one of the first to suggest a tripartite structure, subsequently agreed upon and expanded by other critics: the imagery in the sonnet moves from Greek history and mythology (the reference to Alcestis) through Jewish law (the purification mandated by the "old Law"), to Christian salvation, one critic describing the movement as "a progressive definition of salvation". According to John Spencer Hill, this particular structure is typical of Milton's later writings: he sees it in Books IV and V (Proserpine-Eve-Mary) and Books XI and XII (Deucalion-Noah-Christ) of Paradise Lost, and in Samson Agonistes (Hercules-Samson-Christ): the triptychs, whose figures are taken successively, do not just complement each other; cumulatively they present an organic process toward spiritual fulfillment in the antitype. The poem has undergone numerous translations into various languages. Recent examples include the 2022 Spanish rendition “Creí mirar a mi difunta amada” by the Mexican poet Mario Murgia, and the 2025 Portuguese version “Creio que vi a minha santa esposa” by the Brazilian scholar Ricardo Sobreira.
