= The History of Britain (Milton) =

Prose work by John Milton

The History of Britain, that Part especially now called England; from the first traditional Beginning, continued to the Norman Conquest. Collected out of the antientest and best Authours thereof, an unfinished prose work by the English poet John Milton, was published in 1670. Milton, who had supported the revolutionary cause during the English Civil War, mixed history based on a wide range of sources with comments on the restored monarchy of his time. He admitted the unreliability of many of his sources, but justified his use of popular fables "be it for nothing else but in favour of our English poets and rhetoricians, who by their art will know how to use them judiciously".

Milton began work on the History around 1649, completing four books in the first phase, then continued in the 1650s with a further two books. The History was first "printed by J.M. for John Hickman at the Rose (and Crown) in St. Paul's Church-Yard."

== Contents ==
The six books are untitled in the free on-line version of the text. The titles below have been added to give an idea of the content.

Book I - Antiquity

"[T]he Caesarean invasions are told with remarkable spirit; and the use of the historic present in the account of the war between Brutus and the Greeks is excellently vivid."

Book II - The Roman era
Book III - Rise of the Saxons

Includes a digression, that was suppressed in early editions, on the relationship between Parliament and the Crown.

Book IV - The seven Saxon kingdoms

Such bickerings to recount, met often in these our writers, what more worth is it than to chronicle the wars of kites or crows flocking and fighting in the air?

Book V - The unification of England: Ecbert to Edgar
Book VI - Edward the Younger to Harold

== Editions ==
- First edition 1670
- Second edition 1677 or 1678
- Third edition 1695
- Fourth edition 1818 - for example, a version printed for "R.Wilks, 89, Chancery-Lane; and may be had of all booksellers-" p1
