= The Ready and Easy Way to Establish a Free Commonwealth =

The Ready and Easy Way to Establish a Free Commonwealth was a political tract by John Milton published in London at the end of February 1660. The full title is "The readie & easie way to establish a Free Commonwealth, and the excellence therof compar'd with the inconveniences and dangers of readmitting kingship in this nation. The author J[ohn] M[ilton]". In the tract, Milton warns against the dangers inherent in a monarchical form of government. A second edition, published in April 1660, steps up the prophetic rhetoric against a monarchy. The book can be seen as an expression of Milton's own antimonarchism.

== Background ==
The 1650s took their toll on Milton, and he was already in a declining state, beginning with his wife dying during the birth of their third daughter and their son dying later in that year. As the years progressed, his blindness overtook him and he was alone. Matters were further complicated for Milton by the death of Cromwell in 1658 and the end of the English Commonwealth. The work was a final plea to try to stop the restoration of a monarchy while Milton promoted the establishment of a Republic. However, this resulted only in his being ignored and mocked.

Milton began writing a pamphlet during early February 1660 while the Rump Parliament was in session with the support of General George Monck. It seemed certain that Monck would put forth a republican form of government that Milton supported but various complications divided Monck from the Parliament during this time. On 21 February, Monck forced Parliament to readmit members that were purged in December 1648 and it seemed certain that the Commonwealth would stay in power. The tract was written to persuade those who still thought that a monarchy would serve as a better form of government than the one Monck was setting into motion.

This was not to happen, and when Milton published his pamphlet The Readie and Easie Way in late February, it was only one month before the Restoration would reestablish a monarchy. By March 1660, Parliament enacted various laws which forced pledges to the defence of the king and all connections with the Commonwealth were dissolved. This was compounded by laws that allowed royalists who may have supported the Parliament during the Civil War to be granted the right to vote shortly before the Long Parliament was dissolved. Monck did not allow the republicans under his command to stand in the way of an establishment of a monarchy, and he eventually allowed the king to return. This prompted Milton to publish a second edition of The Readie and Easie Way at the beginning of April 1660.

== Tract ==
Milton begins his work with a message of hope and admits that he is "not a little rejoicing to hear declar'd, the resolutions of all those who are now in power, jointly tending to the establishment of a free Commonwealth". Early in the tract, Milton believed that the premise of his work would be accepted by his fellows: "I doubt not but all ingenuous and knowing men will easily agree with me, that a free Commonwealth without single person or house of lords, is by far the best government". He continues by attacking "the fond conceit of something like a duke of Venice, put lately into many mens heads, by som one or other suttly driving on under that prettie notion his own ambitious ends to a crown" and declares that "our liberty shall not be hamperd or hoverd over by any ingag'ment to such a potent family as the house of Nassaw, of whom to stand in perpetual doubt and suspicion, but we shall live the cleerest and absolutest free nation in the world".

Milton puts forth his Republican ideas throughout the piece, but he occasionally allows other forms of government to slip into consideration. At one moment, he talks about a monarchy that may satisfy the needs of the people, but he is quick to dismiss such a monarchy as being what England needs:

I denie not but that ther may be such a king, who may regard the common good before his own, may have no vitious favourite, may hearken only to the wisest and incorruptest of his Parlament: but this rarely happ'ns in a monarchie not elective; and it behoves not a wise nation to committ the summ of thir well-being, the whole of thir safetie to fortune. And admit, that monarchy of it self may be convenient to some nations, yet to us who have thrown it out, received back again, it cannot be prove pernicious.

With the monarchy about to be restored, Milton predicted that

if we return to kingship, and soon repent, (as undoubtedly we shall, when we begin to find the old encroachments coming on by little and little upon our consciences, which must necessarily proceed from king and bishop united inseparably in one interest,) we may be forced perhaps to fight over again all that we have fought, and spend over again all that we have spent

In particular, Milton feared that a future King "must be ador'd like a Demigod, with a dissolute and haughtie court about him, of vast expence and luxurie, masks and revels" and fill the court with debauchery.

Near the end of the work, Milton describes how no one would bother to listen to what he said:

What I have spoken, is the language of that which is not called amiss "The good old Cause:” if it seem strange to any, it will not seem more strange, I hope, than convincing to backsliders. Thus much I should perhaps have said, though I were sure I should have spoken only to trees and stones; and had none to cry to, but with the Prophet, O earth, earth, earth! to tell the very soil it self, what her perverse inhabitants are deaf to

=== Second edition ===
The second edition of The Readie and Easie Way was transformed with the knowledge that Monck would not stop the Restoration. An epigram, taken from Juvenal, connects Monck to Sulla and Sulla's dictatorship leading to the rise of Caesar: et nos consilium dedimus Syllae, demus populo nunc (we have advised Sulla, now let us advise the people).

The tract responds to various attacks on the first edition, including those who believe that there will be less liberty under a republican government that may ignore the will of a people. Milton believes that the even if the majority want a monarchy, they are attacking their own liberty and that the minority must try to preserve the freedom of everyone:

More just it is doubtless, if it com to force, that a less number compel a greater to retain, which can be no wrong to them, thir libertie, then that a greater number for the pleasure of their baseness, compel a less most injuriously to be thir fellow slaves. They who seek nothing but thir own just libertie, have always right to win it and to keep it, whenever they have power, be the voices never so numerous that oppose it.

== Themes ==
Milton's view of monarchy and the decadence of monarchy is a theme later emphasised in Paradise Lost. Within this epic, Satan is directly linked to monarchical rule, whereas the pre-fallen Adam is able to act without the pomp of the court. Instead, Milton promotes a republican form of government and believes that it is impossible for a government run by an individual to ever work even if the individual was completely virtuous. He also believed that a true republican would not accept a monarchical form of government.

The tone of the piece is to ensure that the citizenry would not backslide into their old monarchical ways. In particular, Milton relied on predictions of the future combined with biblical analogies to ensure that people knew the dangers inherent in such a governmental system. In particular, Milton argued that it would be a sin against God to bring back the monarchy and warned against the lack of freedom and virtue that would correspond with a king. The second edition emphasises the prophetic qualities of the work.
