= The Reason of Church-Government Urged against Prelaty =

1642 essay by John Milton

The Reason of Church-Government Urged against Prelaty is an essay by English poet John Milton distributed as one of a series of religious pamphlets by the writer. Published in 1642, the political work details Milton's preference for a Presbyterian approach to the Church of England over approaches favoured by the episcopal organization of the time. Milton states that this form of worship stems from Hebrew scriptures. The essay was meant as a response to the beliefs of Bishop Joseph Hall and Archbishop James Ussher.

== Background ==
Milton published The Reason for Church-Government Urged against Prelaty in January/February 1642. The tract was the fourth of his five antiprelatical tracts and was produced 6 months after Animadversions. The work is a response to an attack on his previous works which was titled Certain Briefe Treatises, Written by Diverse Learned Men, Concerning the Ancient and Moderne Government of the Church. Unlike Milton's previous three, he included his name upon the tract and he emphasised himself within the text.

== Tract ==
Milton begins his tract with a discussion on language. In particular, Milton discusses the form of truth and the nature of forms:

if any visible shape can be given to divine things, the very visible shape and image of vertue, whereby she is not only seen in the regular gestures and motions of her heavenly paces as she walkes, but also makes the harmony of her voice audible to mortal eares.

Milton emphasises the need for an open dialogue on these matters, and claims that religious sects are an important part of understanding truth because they serve as reformers. If there is a freedom of speech on religious topics, then the problems of the past can be fixed and the people will be religiously healthy. However, the defence of sects transitions into a defence of his own writing and his own being.

Milton attacks those who ignore scripture and instead emphasise the traditions of the church government:

But let them chaunt while they will of prerogatives, we shall tell them of Scripture; of custom, we of Scripture; of Acts and Statutes, stil of Scripture, til the quick and the pearcing word enter to the dividing of their soules, & the mighty weaknes of the Gospel throw down the weak mightnes of mans reasoning.

Milton believed that ministry was an important focus, and tries to connect his own action to that of a minister. He reveals his personal connection to ministering by relating to his early calling towards such an occupation when he says, "the difficult labours of the Church, to whose service by the intentions of my parents and friends I was destin'd of a child, and in mine own resolutions". In particular, he believed that "tyranny had invaded the Church". and he was called to ministering and claims for himself a connection to a Puritan reform tradition. However, he does not put forth a system that would replace the episcopal government.

In the preface of Book II, Milton gives many of his views about literature and genres:

Time servs not now, and perhaps I might seem to profuse to give any certain account of what the mind at home in the spacious circuits of her musing hath liberty to propose to her self, though of highest hope, and hardest attempting, whether that Epick form whereof the two poems of Homer, and those other two of Virgil and Tasso are a diffuse, and the book of Job a brief model: or whether the rules of Aristotle herein are strictly to be kept, or nature to be follow'd... Or whether those Dramatick constitutions, wherein Sophocles and Euripides raigne shall be found more doctrinal and exemplary to a Nation, the Scripture also affords us a divine pastoral Drama in the Song of Salomon constiting of two persons and a double Chorus, as Origen rightly judges. And the Apocalyps of Saint John is the majestick image of a high and stately Tragedy, shutting up and intermingly her solemn Scenes and Acts with a sevenfold Chorus of halleluja's and harping symphonies... Or if occasion shall lead to imitat those magnifick Odes and Hymns wherein Pindarus and Callimachus are in most things worthy, some others in their frame judicious, in their matter most an end faulty: But those frequent songs throughout the law and prophets beyond all these, not in their divine argument alone, but in the very critical art of composition may be easily made appear over all the kinds of Lyrick poesy, to be incomparable.

== Themes ==
Milton's views on forms and the nature of truth and virtue were developed later in his Areopagitica. Also, his views on poetry and art, contained within the preface of Book II, served as a basis for his later poetry. Milton agreed with those like Philip Sidney and Ben Jonson that literature required an ethical function, but he believed that their views were corrupted by their support of traditional power structures.
