= A Treatise of Civil Power =

A Treatise of Civil Power was published by the English poet and polemicist John Milton in February 1659. The work argues over the definition and nature of heresy and free thought, and Milton tries to convince the new English Parliament to further his cause.

The work is addressed the work to the Lord Protector Richard Cromwell. Milton expresses his belief that an individual's conscience was more important than any external factors or forces, advocating freedom of religion or the ability of people to voluntarily choose their own religious affiliation. In context, he opposed any form of state religion.

== Background ==
A Treatise of Civil Power in Ecclesiastical Causes was published in February 1659 after Richard Cromwell established a new Parliament. Milton addresses the tract to Cromwell and Parliament because he was afraid of the various positions of the Interregnum government that promoted intolerance and limited the free speech of individuals (like Milton himself).

== Tract ==
Although Milton knew that the word "heresy" was used as a pejorative, Milton believed that the term was properly defined as "only the choice or following of any opinion good or bad in religion or any other learning". Furthermore, he argues that a man is only moved "by the inward persuasive motions of his spirit".

The text is primarily concerned about the covenants formed between men and of agreements: "Let who so will interpret or determine, so it be according to true church; which is exercis'd on them only who have willingly joined themselves in that covnant of union".

== Themes ==
Milton believed that an individual's conscience was more important than any external factors or forces. He uses heresy in a neutral manner in order to place the concept as an obligation of true Christians. The work, according to John Shawcross, is like other of his later works in that it contains "A fusion of submission and revolution". Thomas Corns believes the language of the text is subdued, comparatively speaking, and contains little of the powers of language found within Milton's earlier prose. Conversely, Kevin Hart wrote in First Things, "His powerful attack against the idea of a state church remains one of the most pungent pieces of prose in the language."
