= Defensio pro Populo Anglicano =

1651 political tract by John Milton

Defensio pro Populo Anglicano is a Latin polemic by John Milton, published in 1651. The full title in English is John Milton an Englishman His Defence of the People of England. It was a piece of propaganda, and made political argument in support of what was at the time the government of England.

== Background ==
This work was commissioned by Parliament during Oliver Cromwell's protectorate of England, as a response to a work by Claudius Salmasius entitled Defensio Regia pro Carolo I ("Royal Defence on behalf of Charles I"). Salmasius argued that the rebels led by Cromwell were guilty of regicide for executing King Charles. Milton responded with a detailed justification of the parliamentary party.

== Style ==
The work includes invective against Salmasius and accusations of that scholar's inconsistency for taking contradictory positions. Milton also claims Salmasius wrote his work only due to being bribed with a "hundred Jacobuses" by the exiled son of Charles, who would later become King Charles II of England. The level of ad hominem attack is high and much unlike what one would expect from a serious contemporary debater even on a controversial topic. Here is an excerpt from the beginning of Chapter VIII, where Milton sarcastically asks Salmasius what concern the latter has with what the English do among themselves:

...It were better for you to return to those illustrious titles of yours in France: first to that hungerstarved Seigneurie of St. Loup, and next to that sacré Council of the Most Christian King; you are too far abroad from your own country for a counsellor. But I see full well that France desires not either you or your counsel, and did not, even when you were back a few years ago, and were beginning to smell out and hunt after a Cardinal's kitchen. She is right, by my troth, she is right, and can willingly allow you, you French capon, with your mankind wife and your desks chock-full of emptiness, to wander about, till somewhere in creation you light upon a dole bountiful enough for a grammarian-cavalier or illustrious hippo-critic,--always supposing any king or state has a mind to bid highest for a vagabond pedant that is on sale....

Despite the level of insult employed, Milton's polemic provided an effective response, both rhetorically and argumentatively, to Salmasius' volume. As John Alvis notes, Milton "ridicule[s] his adversary for having changed sides in a controversy, for meddling in the affairs of a nation foreign to him, and for having written in the pay of the son of the king he champions." At the same time, some critics such as George Saintsbury in the Cambridge History of English and American Literature have condemned this work and Milton's later Defensio Secunda, asserting that they show, in Saintbury's words, "a good deal of bandying of authority and of wearisome rebutting on particular points."

== Further controversy ==
Salmasius published no response during his lifetime, but a fragment of a reply was printed posthumously. A long anonymous reply, Pro Rege et Populo Anglicano, appeared later, in 1651 at Antwerp; this was authored by a royalist clergyman, John Rowland. It was answered on Milton's behalf by his nephew John Phillips, although Milton is reported to have given his nephew's work "Examination and Polishment" before publication.
