= John Milton =

English poet and civil servant (1608–1674)

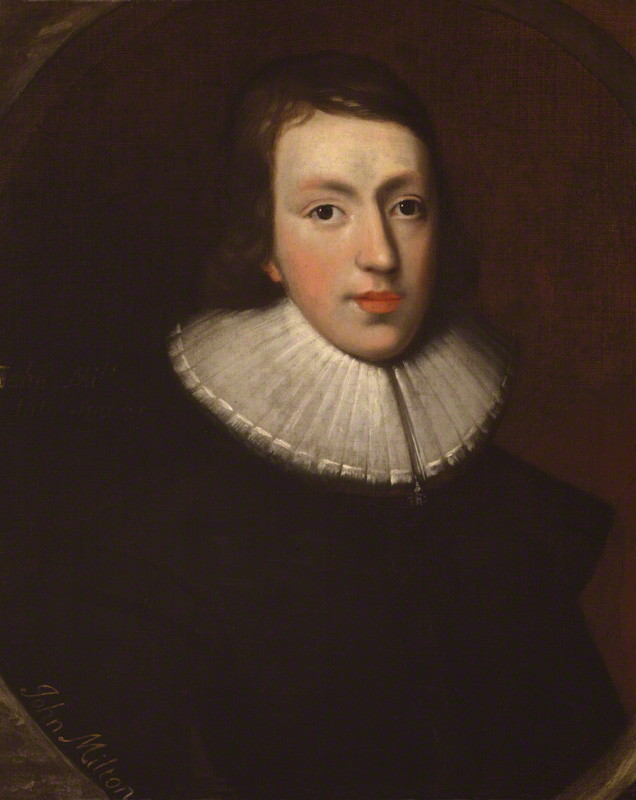
- Unknown artist, John Milton (circa 1629) in the National Portrait Gallery (England), oil on canvas.
- Born: 9 December 1608; Bread Street, City of London, England
- Died: 9 November 1674 (aged 65); Bunhill Row, Middlesex, England
- Resting place: St Giles-without-Cripplegate
- Education: Christ's College, Cambridge (BA, MA)
- Occupations: Poet; Intellectual; Civil Servant
- Spouses: Mary Powell (m. 1642; died 1652) Katherine Woodcock (m. 1656; died 1658) Elizabeth Mynshull (m. 1663)
- Children: 5
- Writing career
- Language: English; Latin; Greek; Hebrew; French; Spanish; Italian; Old English; Dutch; Aramaic; Syriac
- Period: 17th century; Restoration
- Genres: Poetry; pamphlet; treatise
- Subjects: Religious and political freedom
- Notable works: Paradise Lost; Areopagitica; Lycidas; Samson Agonistes
- Movements: English Renaissance; Baroque

Secretary for Foreign Tongues to the Council of State
- In office March 1649 – May 1660

John Milton (9 December 1608 – 8 November 1674) was an English poet, polemicist, and civil servant. His 1667 epic poem Paradise Lost was written in blank verse and included 12 books, written in a time of immense religious flux and political upheaval. It addressed the fall of man, including the temptation of Adam and Eve by the fallen angel Satan, and God's expulsion of them from the Garden of Eden. Paradise Lost elevated Milton's reputation as one of history's greatest poets. He also served as a civil servant for the Commonwealth of England under its Council of State and later under Oliver Cromwell.

Milton achieved fame and recognition during his lifetime. His celebrated Areopagitica (1644), condemning pre-publication censorship, is among history's most influential and impassioned defences of freedom of speech and freedom of the press. His desire for freedom extended beyond his philosophy and was reflected in his style, which included his introduction of new words to the English language, coined from Latin and Ancient Greek. He was the first modern writer to employ unrhymed verse outside the theatre or translations.

Milton is described as the "greatest English author" by his biographer William Hayley, and he remains generally regarded "as one of the preeminent writers in the English language", though critical reception has oscillated in the centuries since his death, often on account of his republicanism. Samuel Johnson praised Paradise Lost as "a poem which ... with respect to design may claim the first place, and with respect to performance, the second, among the productions of the human mind", though he (a Tory) described Milton's politics as those of an "acrimonious and surly republican". Milton was revered by poets such as William Blake, William Wordsworth, and Thomas Hardy.

Phases of Milton's life parallel the major historical and political divisions in Stuart England at the time. In his early years, Milton studied at Christ's College at the University of Cambridge, and then travelled, wrote poetry mostly for private circulation, and launched a career as pamphleteer and publicist under Charles I's increasingly autocratic rule and Britain's breakdown into constitutional confusion and ultimately civil war. He was once considered dangerously radical and heretical, but he contributed to a seismic shift in accepted public opinions during his life that ultimately elevated him to public office in England. The Restoration of 1660 and his loss of vision later deprived Milton of much of his public platform, but he used the period to develop many of his major works.

Milton's views developed from extensive reading, travel, and experience that began with his days as a student at the University of Cambridge in the 1620s and continued through the English Civil War, which started in 1642 and continued until 1651. By the time of his death in 1674, Milton was impoverished and on the margins of English intellectual life but famous throughout Europe and unrepentant for political choices that placed him at odds with governing authorities.

Milton is widely regarded as one of the greatest poets in English literature, though his oeuvre has drawn criticism from notable figures, including T. S. Eliot. According to some scholars, Milton was second in influence to none but William Shakespeare. In one of his books, Johnson praised him for having the power of "displaying the vast, illuminating the splendid, enforcing the awful, darkening the gloomy and aggravating the dreadful".

== Early life and education ==
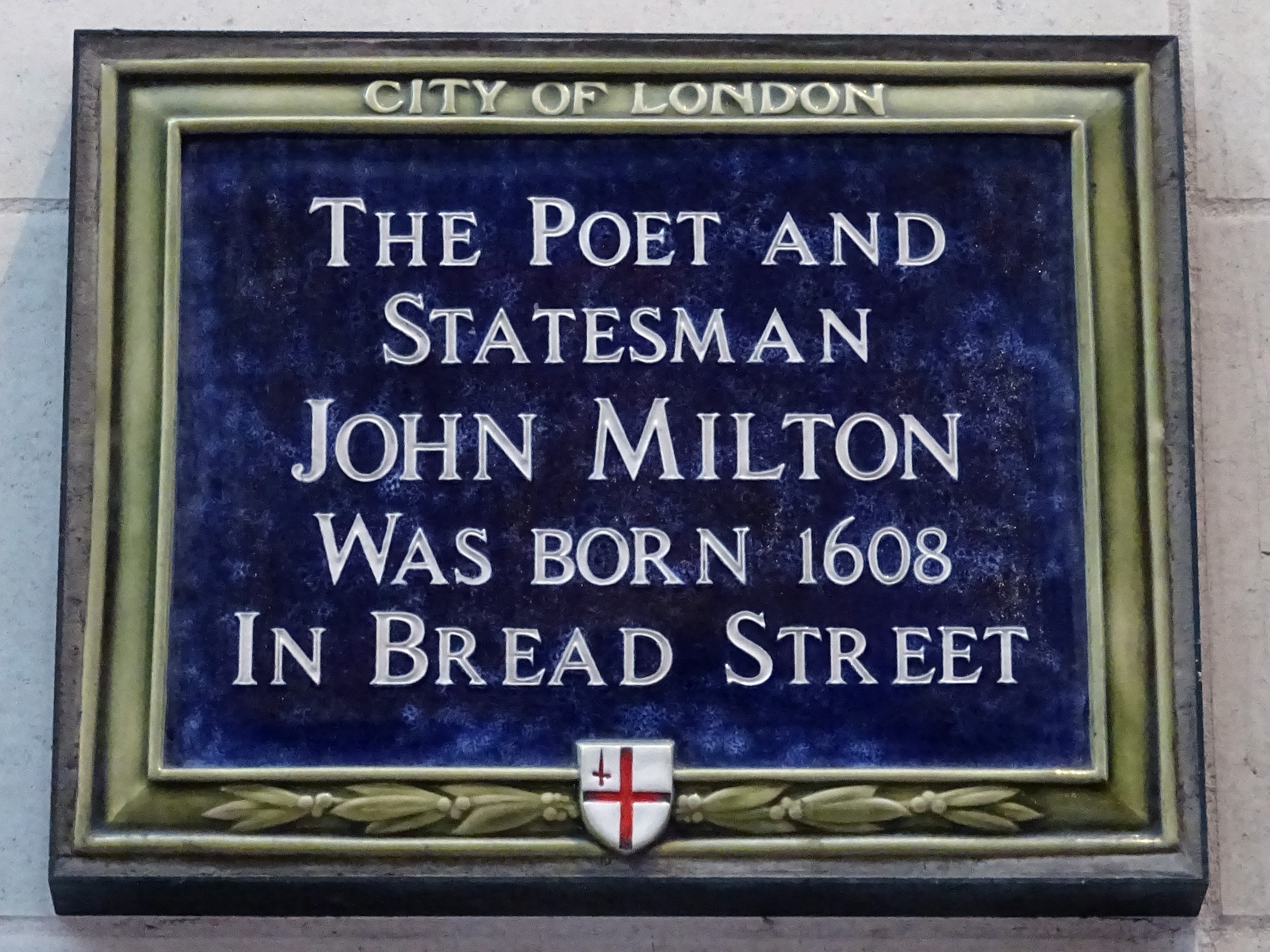
Blue plaque on 1 Bread Street, London, commemorating Milton's birthplace

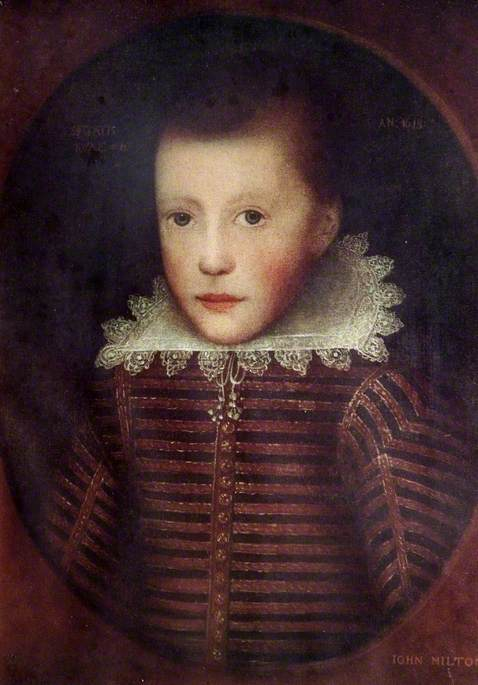
Portrait of Milton at age 10 in Milton's Cottage, Chalfont St Giles, Buckinghamshire, painted by Cornelis Janssens van Ceulen

John Milton was born in Bread Street, London, on 9 December 1608, the son of composer John Milton and his wife Sarah Jeffrey. The senior John Milton (1562–1647) moved to London around 1583 after being disinherited by his devout Catholic father Richard Milton for embracing Protestantism. In London, the senior John Milton married Sarah Jeffrey (1572–1637) and found lasting financial success as a scrivener. He lived in and worked from a house in Cheapside at Bread Street, where the Mermaid Tavern was located. The elder Milton was noted for his skill as a composer of music, and this talent left his son with a lifelong appreciation for music and friendships with musicians such as Henry Lawes.

The prosperity of Milton's father allowed his eldest son to obtain a private tutor, Thomas Young, a Scottish Presbyterian with an MA from the University of St Andrews. Young's influence also served as the poet's introduction to religious radicalism. After Young's tutorship, Milton attended St Paul's School in London, where he began the study of Latin and Greek; the classical languages left an imprint on both his poetry and prose in English (he also wrote in Latin and Italian).

Milton's first datable compositions are two psalms written at age 15 at Long Bennington. One contemporary source is Brief Lives of John Aubrey, an uneven compilation including first-hand reports. In the work, Aubrey quotes Christopher, Milton's younger brother: "When he was young, he studied very hard and sat up very late, commonly till twelve or one o'clock at night". Aubrey adds, "His complexion exceeding faire—he was so faire that they called him the Lady of Christ's College."

In 1625, Milton gained entry to Christ's College at the University of Cambridge, where he graduated with a BA in 1629, ranking fourth of 24 honours graduates that year in the University of Cambridge. Preparing, at that time, to become an Anglican priest, he stayed on at Cambridge where he received his MA on 3 July 1632.

Milton may have been rusticated (suspended) in his first year at Cambridge for quarrelling with his tutor, Bishop William Chappell. He was certainly at home in London in the Lent Term 1626; there he wrote Elegia Prima, his first Latin elegy, to Charles Diodati, a friend from St Paul's. Based on remarks of John Aubrey, Chappell "whipt" Milton. This story is now disputed, though certainly Milton disliked Chappell. Historian Christopher Hill notes that Milton was apparently rusticated and that the differences between Chappell and Milton may have been either religious or personal. It is also possible that, like Isaac Newton four decades later, Milton was sent home from Cambridge because of the plague, which afflicted Cambridge in 1625.

At Cambridge, Milton was on good terms with Edward King; he later dedicated "Lycidas" to him. Milton also befriended theologian Roger Williams, tutoring Williams in Hebrew in exchange for lessons in Dutch. Despite developing a reputation for poetic skill and general erudition, Milton suffered from alienation among his peers during his time at Cambridge. Having once watched his fellow students attempting comedy on the college stage, he later observed, "they thought themselves gallant men, and I thought them fools".

Milton also was disdainful of the university curriculum, which consisted of stilted formal debates conducted in Latin on abstruse topics. His own corpus is not devoid of humour, notably his sixth prolusion and his epitaphs on the death of Thomas Hobson. While at Cambridge, he wrote some of his well-known shorter English poems, including "On the Morning of Christ's Nativity", "Epitaph on the admirable Dramaticke Poet, W. Shakespeare" (his first poem to appear in print), L'Allegro, and Il Penseroso.

== Study, poetry, and travel ==
It appears in all his writings that he had the usual concomitant of great abilities, a lofty and steady confidence in himself, perhaps not without some contempt of others; for scarcely any man ever wrote so much, and praised so few. Of his praise he was very frugal; as he set its value high, and considered his mention of a name as a security against the waste of time, and a certain preservative from oblivion.

— Samuel Johnson, Lives of the Most Eminent English Poets

After receiving his MA, Milton moved to Hammersmith, his father's new home since the previous year. He also lived at Horton, Berkshire, from 1635 and undertook six years of self-directed private study. Hill argues that this was not retreating into a rural idyll; Hammersmith was then a "suburban village" falling into the orbit of London, and even Horton was becoming deforested and suffered from the plague. He read both ancient and modern works of theology, philosophy, history, politics, literature, and science in preparation for a prospective poetical career. Milton's intellectual development can be charted via entries in his commonplace book (like a scrapbook), now in the British Library. As a result of such intensive study, Milton is considered to be among the most learned of all English poets. In addition to his years of private study, Milton had command of Latin, Greek, Hebrew, French, Spanish, and Italian from his school and undergraduate days; he also added Old English to his linguistic repertoire in the 1650s while researching his History of Britain, and probably acquired proficiency in Dutch soon after.

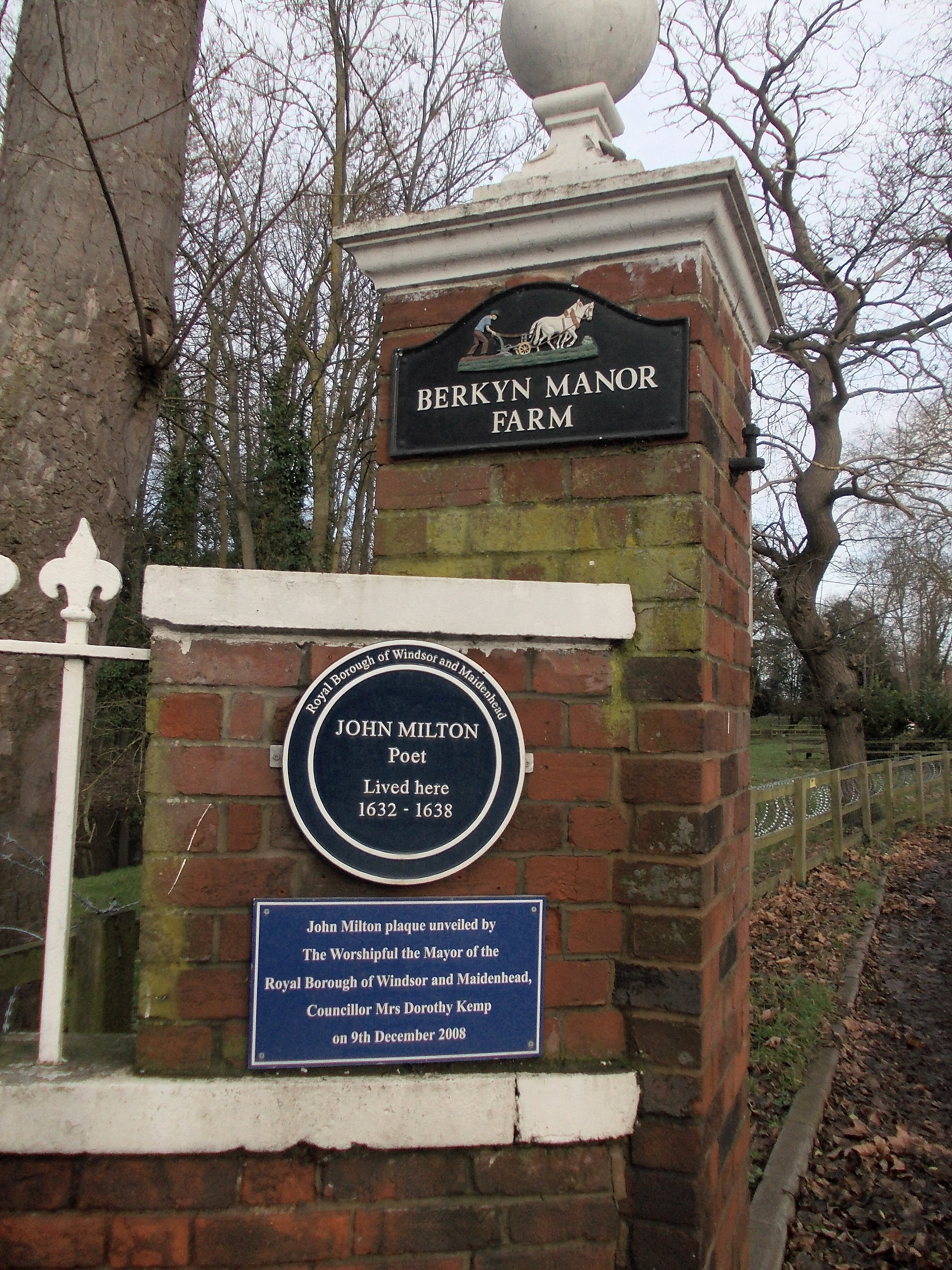
Commemorative blue plaque 'John Milton lived here 1632–1638' at Berkyn Manor Farm, Horton, Berkshire

Milton continued to write poetry during this period of study; his Arcades and Comus were both commissioned for masques composed for noble patrons, connections of the Egerton family, and performed in 1632 and 1634 respectively. Comus argues for the virtuousness of temperance and chastity. He contributed his pastoral elegy Lycidas to a memorial collection for one of his fellow students at Cambridge. Drafts of these poems are preserved in Milton's poetry notebook, known as the Trinity Manuscript, because it is now kept at Trinity College, Cambridge. It was Charles Mason who made the extraordinary discovery, in the library of Trinity College, of a packet of thirty loose and tattered folio leaves, almost covered with the handwriting of Milton. It is thought that Mason recognised the nature of this material around 1735 and the loose-leaf sheets were bound for the first time in 1736; the Trinity Manuscript has been described as "the chief treasure of Trinity Library".

In May 1638, accompanied by a manservant, Milton embarked upon a tour of France and Italy for 15 months that lasted until July or August 1639. His travels supplemented his study with new and direct experiences of artistic and religious traditions, especially Roman Catholicism. He met famous theorists and intellectuals of the time and was able to display his poetic skills. For specific details of what happened within Milton's "grand tour", there appears to be just one primary source: Milton's own Defensio Secunda. There are other records, including some letters and some references in his other prose tracts, but the bulk of the information about the tour comes from a work that, according to Barbara Lewalski, "was not intended as autobiography but as rhetoric, designed to emphasise his sterling reputation with the learned of Europe."

He first went to Calais and then on to Paris, riding horseback, with a letter from diplomat Henry Wotton to ambassador John Scudamore. Through Scudamore, Milton met Hugo Grotius, a Dutch law philosopher, playwright, and poet. Milton left France soon after this meeting. He travelled south from Nice to Genoa, and then to Livorno and Pisa. He reached Florence in July 1638. While there, Milton enjoyed many of the sites and structures of the city. His candour of manner and erudite neo-Latin poetry earned him friends in Florentine intellectual circles, and he met the astronomer Galileo who was under house arrest at Arcetri, as well as others. Milton probably visited the Florentine Academy and the Accademia della Crusca along with smaller academies in the area, including the Apatisti and the Svogliati.

In [Florence], which I have always admired above all others because of the elegance, not just of its tongue, but also of its wit, I lingered for about two months. There I at once became the friend of many gentlemen eminent in rank and learning, whose private academies I frequented—a Florentine institution which deserves great praise not only for promoting humane studies but also for encouraging friendly intercourse.

— Milton's account of Florence in Defensio Secunda

He left Florence in September to continue to Rome. With the connections from Florence, Milton was able to have easy access to Rome's intellectual society. His poetic abilities impressed those like Giovanni Salzilli, who praised Milton within an epigram. In late October, Milton attended a dinner given by the English College, Rome, despite his dislike for the Society of Jesus, meeting English Catholics who were also guests—theologian Henry Holden and the poet Patrick Cary. He also attended musical events, including oratorios, operas, and melodramas. Milton left for Naples toward the end of November, where he stayed only for a month because of the Spanish control. During that time, he was introduced to Giovanni Battista Manso, patron to both Torquato Tasso and to Giambattista Marino.

Originally, Milton wanted to leave Naples in order to travel to Sicily and then on to Greece, but he returned to England during the summer of 1639 because of what he claimed in Defensio Secunda were "sad tidings of civil war in England." Matters became more complicated when Milton received word that his childhood friend Diodati had died. Milton in fact stayed another seven months on the continent and spent time at Geneva with Diodati's uncle after he returned to Rome. In Defensio Secunda, Milton proclaimed that he was warned against a return to Rome because of his frankness about religion, but he stayed in the city for two months and was able to experience Carnival and meet Lukas Holste, a Vatican librarian who guided Milton through its collection. He was introduced to Cardinal Francesco Barberini who invited Milton to an opera hosted by the Cardinal. Around March, Milton travelled once again to Florence, staying there for two months, attending further meetings of the academies, and spending time with friends. After leaving Florence, he travelled through Lucca, Bologna, and Ferrara before coming to Venice. In Venice, Milton was exposed to a model of Republicanism, later important in his political writings, but he soon found another model when he travelled to Geneva. From Switzerland, Milton travelled to Paris and then to Calais before finally arriving back in England in either July or August 1639.

== Civil war, prose tracts, and marriage ==
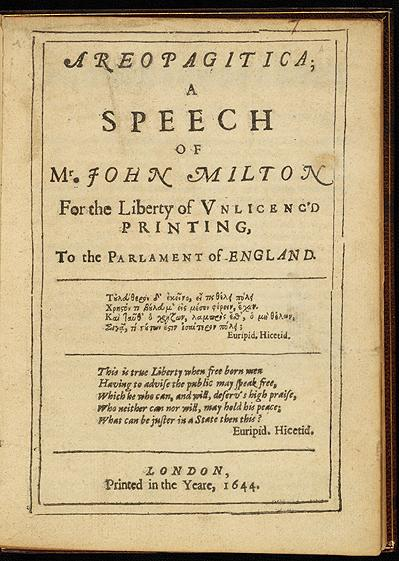
Title page of the 1644 edition of Areopagitica

On returning to England where the Bishops' Wars presaged further armed conflict, Milton began to write prose tracts against episcopacy, in the service of the Puritan and Parliamentary cause. Milton's first foray into polemics was Of Reformation touching Church Discipline in England (1641), followed by Of Prelatical Episcopacy, the two defences of Smectymnuus (a group of Presbyterian divines named from their initials; the "TY" belonged to Milton's old tutor Thomas Young), and The Reason of Church-Government Urged against Prelaty. He vigorously attacked the High-church party of the Church of England and their leader William Laud, Archbishop of Canterbury, with frequent passages of real eloquence lighting up the rough controversial style of the period, and deploying a wide knowledge of church history.

He was supported by his father's investments, but Milton became a private schoolmaster at this time, educating his nephews and other children of the well-to-do. This experience and discussions with educational reformer Samuel Hartlib led him to write his short tract Of Education in 1644, urging a reform of the national universities.

In June 1642, Milton paid a visit to the manor house at Forest Hill, Oxfordshire, and, aged 34, married the 17-year-old Mary Powell. The marriage got off to a poor start as Mary did not adapt to Milton's austere lifestyle or get along with his nephews. Milton found her intellectually unsatisfying and disliked the royalist views she had absorbed from her family. It is also speculated that she refused to consummate the marriage. Mary soon returned home to her parents and did not come back until 1645, partly because of the outbreak of the Civil War.

In the meantime, her desertion prompted Milton to publish a series of pamphlets over the next three years arguing for the legality and morality of divorce beyond grounds of adultery. (Anna Beer, author of a 2008 biography of Milton, points to a lack of evidence and the dangers of cynicism in urging that it was not necessarily the case that the private life so animated the public polemicising.) In 1643, Milton had a brush with the authorities over these writings, in parallel with Hezekiah Woodward, who had more trouble. It was the hostile response accorded the divorce tracts that spurred Milton to write Areopagitica; A speech of Mr. John Milton for the Liberty of Unlicenc'd Printing, to the Parlament of England, his celebrated attack on pre-printing censorship. In Areopagitica, Milton aligns himself with the parliamentary cause, and he also begins to synthesize the ideal of neo-Roman liberty with that of Christian liberty. Milton also courted another woman during this time; we know nothing of her except that her name was Davis and she turned him down. However, it was enough to induce Mary Powell into returning to him which she did unexpectedly by begging him to take her back. They had two daughters in quick succession following their reconciliation.

== Secretary for Foreign Tongues ==
With the Parliamentary victory in the Civil War, Milton used his pen in defence of the republican principles represented by the Commonwealth. The Tenure of Kings and Magistrates (1649) defended the right of the people to hold their rulers to account, and implicitly sanctioned the regicide; Milton's political reputation got him appointed Secretary for Foreign Tongues by the Council of State in March 1649. His main job description was to compose the English Republic's foreign correspondence in Latin and other languages, but he also was called upon to produce propaganda for the regime and to serve as a censor.

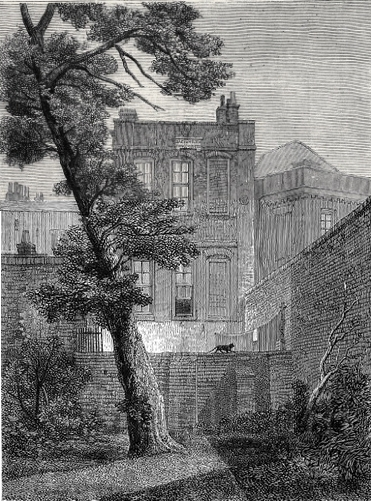
The back of no 19 York Street (1848). In 1651, Milton moved into a "pretty garden-house" in Petty France, Westminster. He lived there until the Restoration. Later it became No. 19 York Street, belonged to Jeremy Bentham, was occupied successively by James Mill and William Hazlitt, and finally was demolished in 1877.

In October 1649, he published Eikonoklastes, an explicit defence of the regicide, in response to the Eikon Basilike, a phenomenal best-seller popularly attributed to Charles I that portrayed the King as an innocent Christian martyr. A month later the exiled Charles II and his party published the defence of monarchy Defensio Regia pro Carolo Primo, written by leading humanist Claudius Salmasius. By January of the following year, Milton was ordered to write a defence of the English people by the Council of State. Milton worked more slowly than usual, given the European audience and the English Republic's desire to establish diplomatic and cultural legitimacy, as he drew on the learning marshalled by his years of study to compose a riposte.

On 24 February 1652, Milton published his Latin defence of the English people Defensio pro Populo Anglicano, also known as the First Defence. Milton's pure Latin prose and evident learning exemplified in the First Defence quickly made him a European reputation, and the work ran to numerous editions. He addressed his Sonnet 16 to 'The Lord Generall Cromwell in May 1652' beginning "Cromwell, our chief of men ...", although it was not published until 1654.

In 1654, Milton completed the second defence of the English nation Defensio secunda in response to an anonymous Royalist tract "Regii Sanguinis Clamor ad Coelum Adversus Parricidas Anglicanos" [The Cry of the Royal Blood to Heaven Against the English Parricides], a work that made many personal attacks on Milton. The second defence praised Oliver Cromwell, now Lord Protector, while exhorting him to remain true to the principles of the Revolution. Alexander Morus, to whom Milton wrongly attributed the Clamor (in fact by Peter du Moulin), published an attack on Milton, in response to which Milton published the autobiographical Defensio pro se in 1655. Milton held the appointment of Secretary for Foreign Tongues to the Commonwealth Council of State until 1660, although after he had become totally blind, most of the work was done by his deputies, Georg Rudolph Wecklein, then Philip Meadows, and from 1657 by the poet Andrew Marvell.

By 1652, Milton had become totally blind; the cause of his blindness is debated but bilateral retinal detachment or glaucoma are most likely. His blindness forced him to dictate his verse and prose to amanuenses who copied them out for him; one of these was Andrew Marvell. One of his best-known sonnets, "When I Consider How My Light is Spent", titled by a later editor, John Newton, "On His Blindness", is presumed to date from this period.

== The Restoration ==
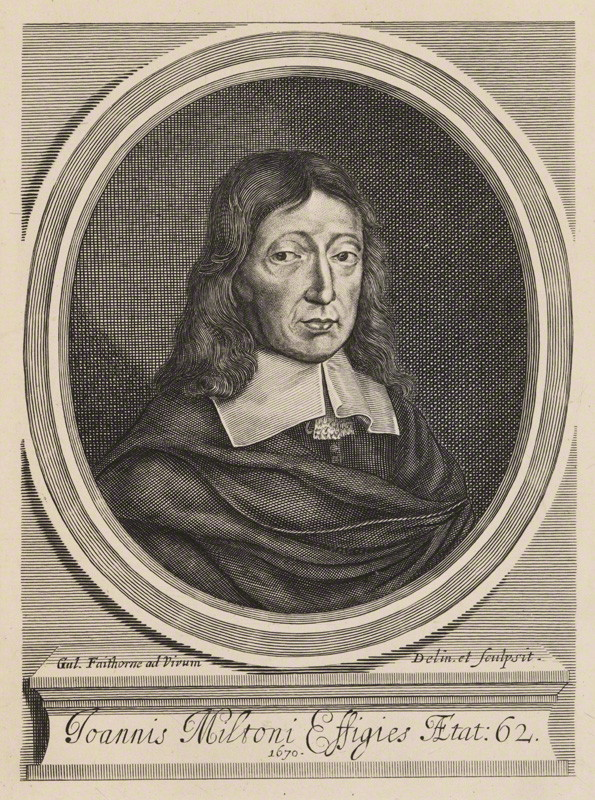
Engraving by William Faithorne, 1670

Cromwell's death in 1658 caused the English Republic to collapse into feuding military and political factions. Milton, however, stubbornly clung to the beliefs that had originally inspired him to write for the Commonwealth. In 1659, he published A Treatise of Civil Power, attacking the concept of a state-dominated church (the position known as Erastianism), as well as Considerations touching the likeliest means to remove hirelings, denouncing corrupt practises in church governance. As the Republic disintegrated, Milton wrote several proposals to retain a non-monarchical government against the wishes of parliament, soldiers, and the people.

- A Letter to a Friend, Concerning the Ruptures of the Commonwealth, written in October 1659, was a response to General Lambert's recent dissolution of the Rump Parliament.
- Proposals of certain expedients for the preventing of a civil war now feared, written in November 1659.
- The Ready and Easy Way to Establishing a Free Commonwealth, in two editions, responded to General Monck's march towards London to restore the Long Parliament (which led to the restoration of the monarchy). The work is an impassioned, bitter, and futile jeremiad damning the English people for backsliding from the cause of liberty and advocating the establishment of an authoritarian rule by an oligarchy set up by an unelected parliament.

Upon the Restoration in May 1660, Milton, fearing for his life, went into hiding, while a warrant was issued for his arrest and his writings were burnt. He re-emerged after a general pardon was issued, but was nevertheless arrested and briefly imprisoned before influential friends intervened, such as Marvell, now an MP. Milton married for a third and final time on 24 February 1663, marrying Elizabeth (Betty) Minshull, aged 24, a native of Wistaston, Cheshire. He spent the remaining decade of his life living quietly in London, only retiring to a cottage during the Great Plague of London—Milton's Cottage in Chalfont St. Giles, his only extant home.

During this period, Milton published several minor prose works, such as the grammar textbook Art of Logic and a History of Britain. His only explicitly political tracts were the 1672 Of True Religion, arguing for toleration (except for Catholics), and a translation of a Polish tract advocating an elective monarchy. Both these works were referred to in the Exclusion debate, the attempt to exclude the heir presumptive from the throne of England—James, Duke of York—because he was Roman Catholic. That debate preoccupied politics in the 1670s and 1680s and precipitated the formation of the Whig party and the Glorious Revolution.

== Death ==
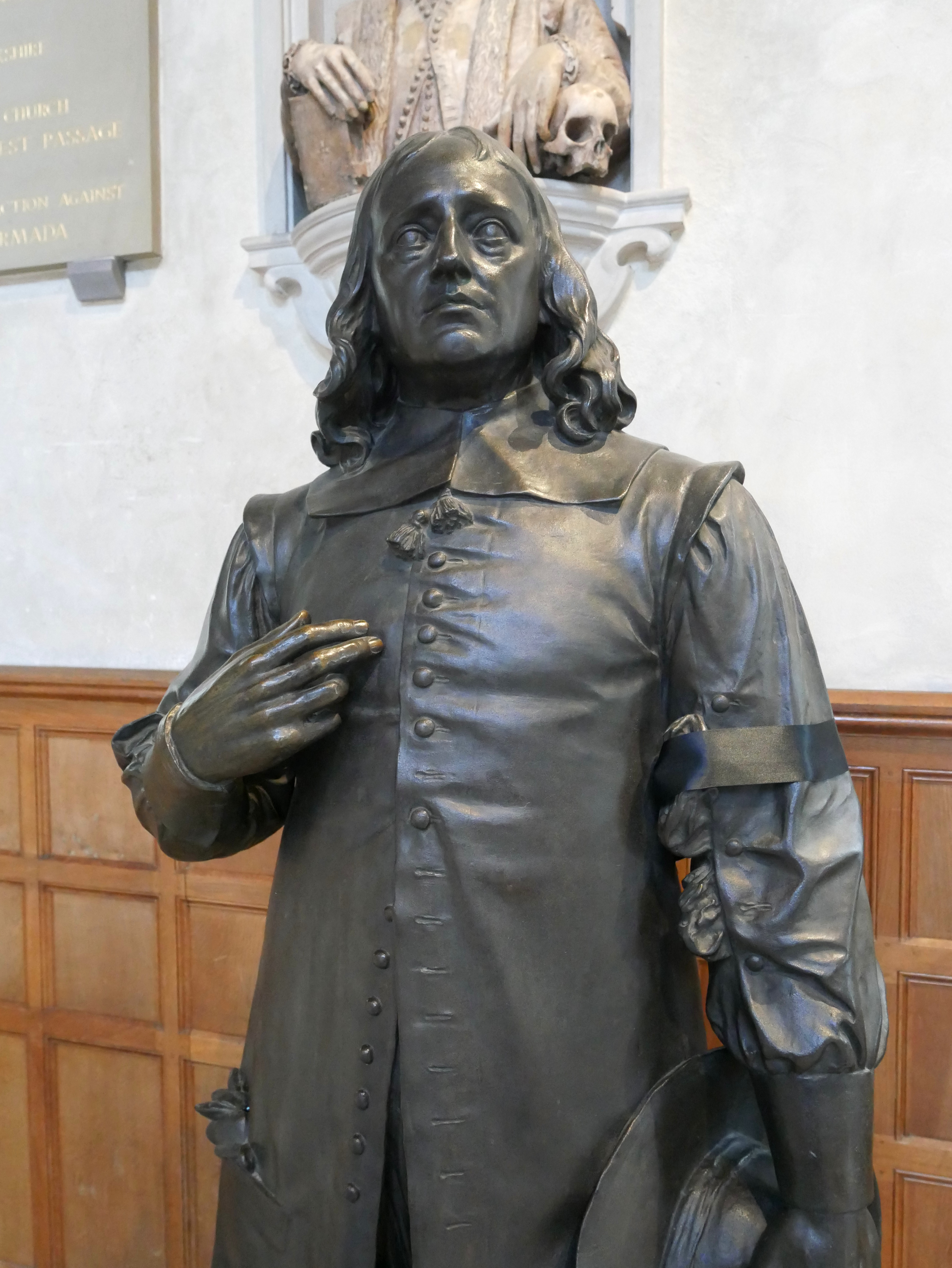
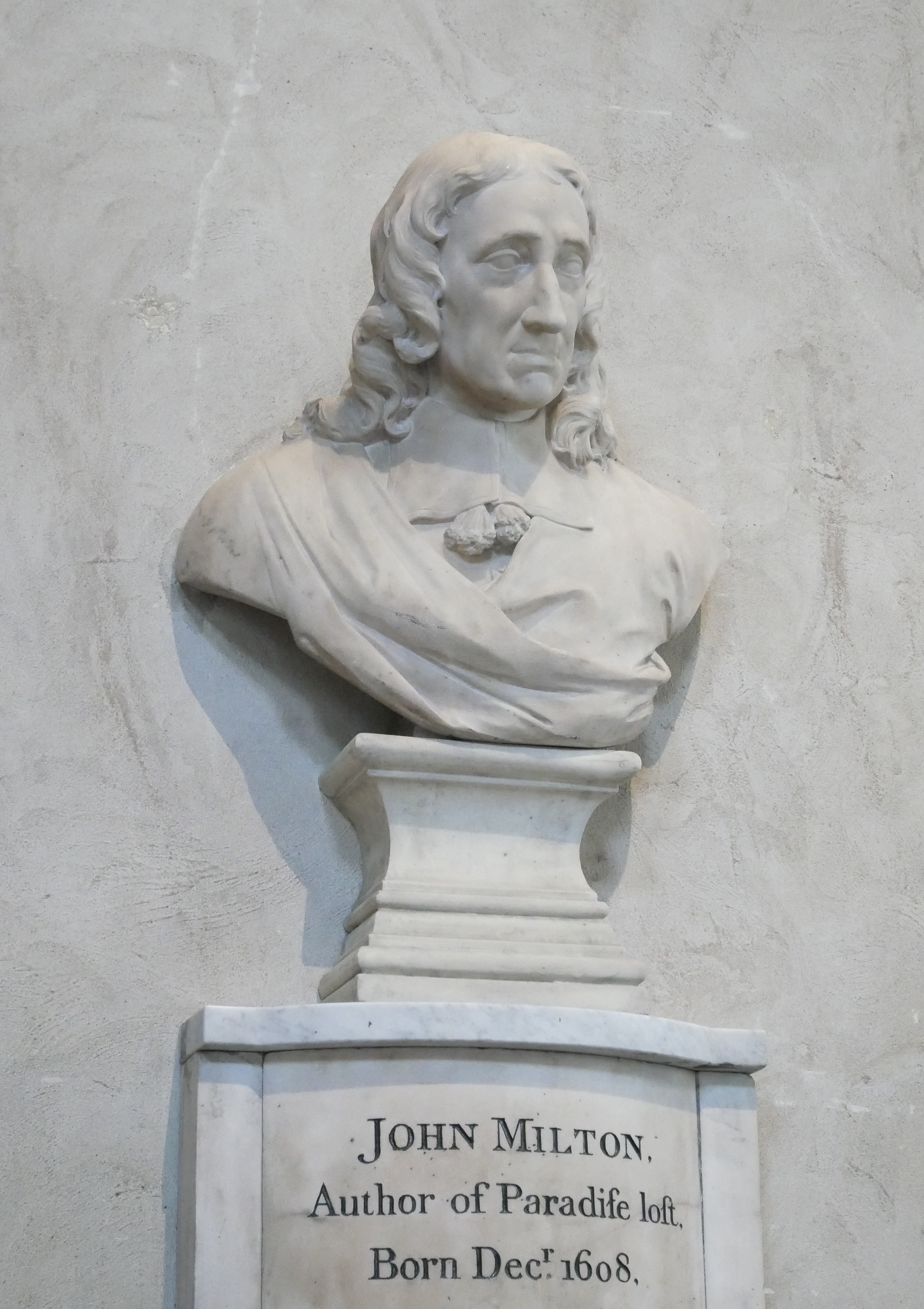
Milton's statue and memorial in St Giles-without-Cripplegate church, London

Milton died on 9 or 10 November 1674, a month before he turned 66. He was buried in the church of St Giles-without-Cripplegate, Fore Street, London. It is disputed whether the cause of death was consumption or gout. According to an early biographer, his funeral was attended by "his learned and great Friends in London, not without a friendly concourse of the Vulgar." A monument was added in 1737 on Westminster Abbey in London, UK.

== Family ==
Milton and his first wife Mary Powell (1625–1652) had four children:

- Anne (born 29 July 1646)
- Mary (born 25 October 1648)
- John (16 March 1651 – June 1652)
- Deborah (2 May 1652 – 10 August 1727)

Mary Powell died on 5 May 1652 from complications following Deborah's birth. Milton's daughters survived to adulthood. Some early accounts indicate that he had a strained relationship with them, others that at least Deborah had a positive relationship with him.

On 12 November 1656, Milton married Katherine Woodcock at St Margaret's, Westminster. She died on 3 February 1658, less than four months after giving birth to her daughter Katherine, who also died.

Milton married for a third time on 24 February 1663 to Elizabeth Mynshull or Minshull (1638–1728), the niece of Thomas Mynshull, a wealthy apothecary and philanthropist in Manchester. The marriage took place at St Mary Aldermary in the City of London. Despite a 30-year age gap, the marriage seemed happy, according to John Aubrey, and lasted more than 12 years until Milton's death. (A plaque on the wall of Mynshull's House in Manchester describes Elizabeth as Milton's "3rd and Best wife".) Samuel Johnson, however, claims that Mynshull was "a domestic companion and attendant" and Milton's nephew Edward Phillips relates that Mynshull "oppressed his children in his lifetime, and cheated them at his death".

His nephews, Edward and John Phillips (sons of Milton's sister Anne), were educated by Milton and became writers themselves. John acted as a secretary, and Edward was Milton's first biographer.

== Poetry ==
Milton's poetry was slow to see the light of day, at least under his name. His first published poem was "On Shakespeare" (1630), anonymously included in the Second Folio edition of William Shakespeare's plays in 1632. An annotated copy of the First Folio has been suggested to contain marginal notes by Milton. Milton collected his work in 1645 Poems in the midst of the excitement attending the possibility of establishing a new English government. The anonymous edition of Comus was published in 1637, and the publication of Lycidas in 1638 in Justa Edouardo King Naufrago was signed J. M. Otherwise. The 1645 collection was the only poetry of his to see print until Paradise Lost appeared in 1667.

=== Paradise Lost ===
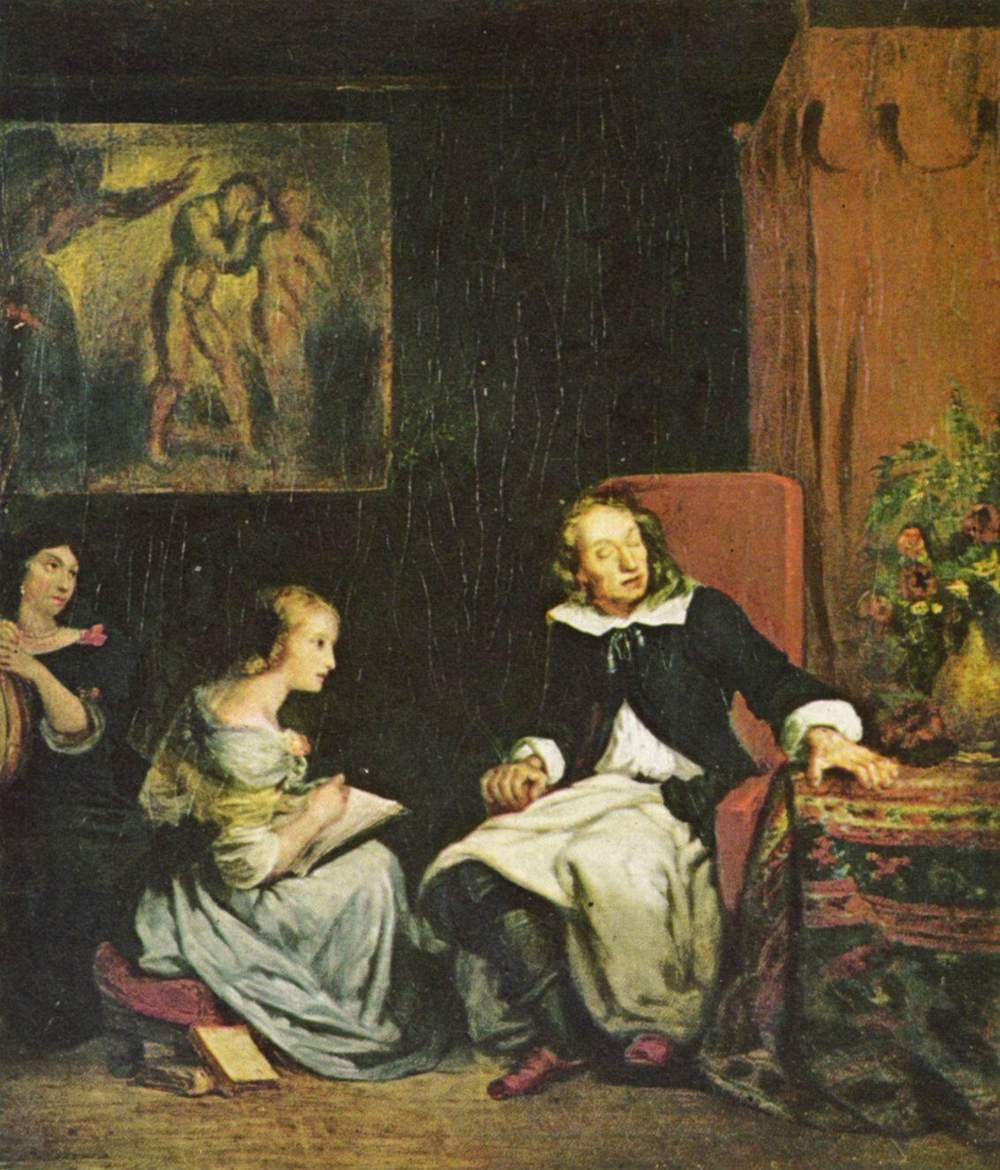
Milton Dictates the Lost Paradise to His Three Daughters, 1827 or 1828, by Eugène Delacroix

Milton's magnum opus, the blank-verse epic poem Paradise Lost, was composed by the blind and impoverished Milton from 1658 to 1664 (first edition), with small but significant revisions published in 1674 (second edition). As a blind poet, Milton dictated his verse to a series of aides in his employ. It has been argued that the poem reflects his personal despair at the failure of the Revolution yet affirms an ultimate optimism in human potential. Some literary critics have argued that Milton encoded many references to his unyielding support for the "Good Old Cause".

On 27 April 1667, Milton sold the publication rights for Paradise Lost to publisher Samuel Simmons for £5 (equivalent to approximately £770 in 2015 purchasing power), with a further £5 to be paid if and when each print run sold out of between 1,300 and 1,500 copies. The first run was a quarto edition priced at three shillings per copy (about £23 in 2015 purchasing power equivalent), published in August 1667, and it sold out in eighteen months.

Milton followed up the publication Paradise Lost with its sequel Paradise Regained, which was published alongside the tragedy Samson Agonistes in 1671. Both of these works also reflect Milton's post-Restoration political situation. Just before his death in 1674, Milton supervised a second edition of Paradise Lost, accompanied by an explanation of "why the poem rhymes not", and prefatory verses by Andrew Marvell. In 1673, Milton republished his 1645 Poems, as well as a collection of his letters and the Latin prolusions from his Cambridge days.

== Views ==
An unfinished religious manifesto, De doctrina christiana, probably written by Milton, lays out many of his heterodox theological views, and was not discovered and published until 1823. Milton's key beliefs were idiosyncratic, not those of an identifiable group or faction, and often they go well beyond the orthodoxy of the time. Their tone, however, stemmed from the Puritan emphasis on the centrality and inviolability of conscience. He was his own man, but he was anticipated by Henry Robinson in Areopagitica.

=== Philosophy ===
While Milton's beliefs are generally considered to be consistent with Protestant Christianity, Stephen M. Fallon argues that by the late 1650s, Milton may have at least toyed with the idea of monism or animist materialism, the notion that a single material substance which is "animate, self-active, and free" composes everything in the universe: from stones and trees and bodies to minds, souls, angels, and God. Fallon claims that Milton devised this position to avoid the mind-body dualism of Plato and Descartes as well as the mechanistic determinism of Hobbes. According to Fallon, Milton's monism is most notably reflected in Paradise Lost when he has angels eat (5.433–439) and apparently engage in sexual intercourse (8.622–629) and the De Doctrina, where he denies the dual natures of man and argues for a theory of Creation ex Deo. Fallon proposes that, in Paradise Lost, Milton portrays humans and angels as being composed of the same basic material, in different degrees. He cites exemplary passages from Raphael's conversation with Adam in Book V, remarking that, for Milton, heavenly spirit is only a more highly perfected expression of earthly matter. Fallon also argues that the reproductive imagery in Milton's creation scene in Book VII points to matter as being animate.

Milton's animist monism, as outlined by Fallon, might have become compromised by an increasing skepticism towards egalitarian politics at the end of his life. John Rogers suggests that the dead matter cast away in the Creation scene of Paradise Lost represents an elitist break from monism and toward a hierarchical dualism between spiritual matter and its grosser counterpart.

=== Political thought ===
Milton was a "passionately individual Christian Humanist poet." He appears on the pages of seventeenth-century English Puritanism, an age characterized as "the world turned upside down". He was a Puritan and yet was unwilling to surrender conscience to party positions on public policy. Thus, Milton's political thought, driven by competing convictions, a Reformed faith and a Humanist spirit, led to enigmatic outcomes.

Milton's apparently contradictory stance on the vital problems of his age, arose from religious contestations to the questions of the divine rights of kings. In both cases, he seems in control, taking stock of the situation arising from the polarization of the English society on religious and political lines. He fought with the Puritans against the Cavaliers i.e. the King's party, and helped win the day. But the very same constitutional and republican polity, when tried to curtail freedom of speech, Milton, given his humanistic zeal, wrote Areopagitica . . . [sic]

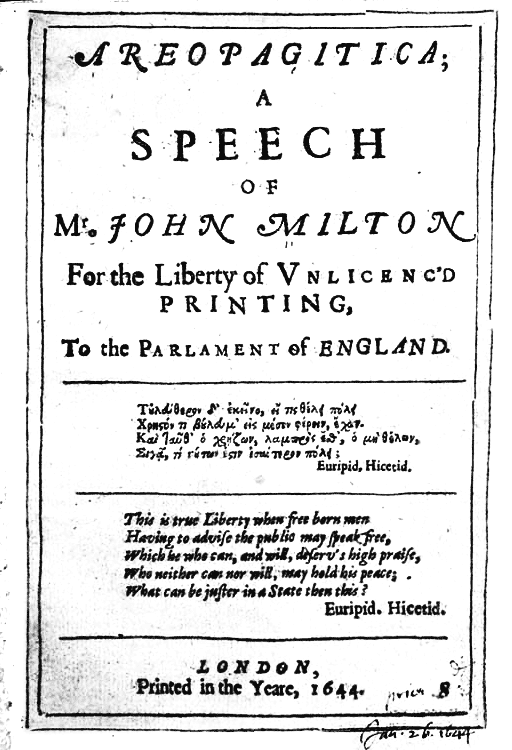
Title page of John Milton's 1644 edition of Areopagitica

Areopagitica was written in response to the Licensing Order, in November 1644.

Milton's political thought may be best categorized according to respective periods in his life and times. The years 1641–42 were dedicated to church politics and the struggle against episcopacy. After his divorce writings, Areopagitica, and a gap, he wrote in 1649–54 in the aftermath of the execution of Charles I, and in polemic justification of the regicide and the existing Parliamentarian regime. Then in 1659–60 he foresaw the Restoration and wrote to head it off.

Milton's own beliefs were in some cases unpopular, particularly his commitment to republicanism. In the coming centuries, Milton would be claimed as an early apostle of liberalism. According to James Tully:

... with Locke as with Milton, republican and contraction conceptions of political freedom join hands in common opposition to the disengaged and passive subjection offered by absolutists such as Hobbes and Robert Filmer.

A friend and ally in the pamphlet wars was Marchamont Nedham. Austin Woolrych considers that although they were quite close, there is "little real affinity, beyond a broad republicanism", between their approaches. Blair Worden remarks that both Milton and Nedham, with others such as Andrew Marvell and James Harrington, would have taken their problem with the Rump Parliament to be not the republic itself, but the fact that it was not a proper republic. Woolrych speaks of "the gulf between Milton's vision of the Commonwealth's future and the reality". In the early version of his History of Britain, begun in 1649, Milton was already writing off the members of the Long Parliament as incorrigible.

He praised Oliver Cromwell as the Protectorate was set up; though subsequently he had major reservations. When Cromwell seemed to be backsliding as a revolutionary, after a couple of years in power, Milton moved closer to the position of Sir Henry Vane, to whom he wrote a sonnet in 1652. The group of disaffected republicans included, besides Vane, John Bradshaw, John Hutchinson, Edmund Ludlow, Henry Marten, Robert Overton, Edward Sexby and John Streater; but not Marvell, who remained with Cromwell's party. Milton had already commended Overton, along with Edmund Whalley and Bulstrode Whitelocke, in Defensio Secunda. Nigel Smith writes that

... John Streater, and the form of republicanism he stood for, was a fulfilment of Milton's most optimistic ideas of free speech and of public heroism [...]

As Richard Cromwell fell from power, he envisaged a step towards a freer republic or "free commonwealth," In the Ready and Easy Way (1660), he invokes the Good Old Cause in the hope of gaining support for republicans, but without offering a democratic solution.

Milton's proposal, backed by reference (amongst other reasons) to the oligarchical Dutch and Venetian constitutions, was for a council with perpetual membership. This attitude cut right across the grain of popular opinion of the time, which swung decisively behind the restoration of the Stuart monarchy that took place later in the year. Milton, an associate of and advocate on behalf of the regicides, was unheeded; Charles II returned in 1660.

Milton's views became more elitist during the Interregnum. Losing faith in popular democracy and immovable conservatism alike, he began to favor government by a minority of competent citizens--and did so in increasingly condescending terms. John Rogers presents this change as evident in Paradise Lost. God's choice to use armed force against disobedient subjects echoes Milton's own endorsement of military suppression against the majority in the Ready and Easy Way.

==== Philhellenism ====
During the 1650s, Milton corresponded with Leonardos Philaras, an Athenian scholar and diplomat who sought European support for the liberation of Greece from Ottoman rule. In a letter of June 1652, Milton expressed his desire for Greece's liberation, believing that the Greeks themselves needed to recover their political initiative and former courage. In 1657, while drafting instructions for an English diplomatic agent to Russia on behalf of Oliver Cromwell, Milton advocated cooperation among Christian powers to liberate the Greeks from Ottoman rule.

For this, he was celebrated as an early philhellene, with Greek politician and composer Andreas Rigopoulos writing a play named "John Milton" (Greek: Ιωάννες Μίλτον) in his honour in 1874.

=== Theology ===
Milton was neither a clergyman nor a theologian; however, theology, and particularly English Calvinism, formed the palette on which he created his greatest thoughts. Milton thought about the great doctrines of the Church amidst the theological crosswinds of his age. The great poet was undoubtedly Reformed (though his grandfather, Richard "the Ranger" Milton had been Roman Catholic). However, Milton's Calvinism had to find expression in a broad-spirited Humanism. Like many Renaissance artists before him, Milton attempted to integrate Christian theology with classical modes. In his early poems, the poet narrator expresses a tension between vice and virtue, the latter invariably related to Protestantism. In Comus, Milton may make ironic use of the Caroline court masque by elevating notions of purity and virtue over the conventions of court revelry and superstition. In his later poems, Milton's theological concerns become more explicit.

His use of biblical citation was wide-ranging; Harris Fletcher, standing at the beginning of the intensification of the study of the use of scripture in Milton's work (poetry and prose, in all languages Milton mastered), notes that typically Milton clipped and adapted biblical quotations to suit the purpose, giving precise chapter and verse only in texts for a more specialized readership. As for the plenitude of Milton's quotations from scripture, Fletcher comments, "For this work, I have in all actually collated about twenty-five hundred of the five to ten thousand direct Biblical quotations which appear therein". Milton's customary English Bible was the Authorized King James. When citing and writing in other languages, he usually employed the Latin translation by Immanuel Tremellius, though "he was equipped to read the Bible in Latin, in Greek, and in Hebrew, including the Targumim or Aramaic paraphrases of the Old Testament, and the Syriac version of the New, together with the available commentaries of those several versions".

Milton embraced many heterodox Christian theological views. He has been accused of rejecting the Trinity, believing instead that the Son was subordinate to the Father, a position known as Arianism; and his sympathy or curiosity was probably engaged by Socinianism: in August 1650 he licensed for publication by William Dugard the Racovian Catechism, based on a non-trinitarian creed. Milton's alleged Arianism, like much of his theology, is still the subject of debate and controversy. Rufus Wilmot Griswold argued that "In none of his great works is there a passage from which it can be inferred that he was an Arian; and in the very last of his writings he declares that "the doctrine of the Trinity is a plain doctrine in Scripture." In Areopagitica, Milton classified Arians and Socinians as "errorists" and "schismatics" alongside Arminians and Anabaptists. A source has interpreted him as broadly Protestant, if not always easy to locate in a more precise religious category. In 2019, John Rogers stated, "Heretics both, John Milton and Isaac Newton were, as most scholars now agree, Arians."

In his 1641 treatise, Of Reformation, Milton expressed his dislike for Catholicism and episcopacy, presenting Rome as a modern Babylon, and bishops as Egyptian taskmasters. These analogies conform to Milton's puritanical preference for Old Testament imagery. He knew at least four commentaries on Genesis: those of John Calvin, Paulus Fagius, David Pareus and Andreus Rivetus.

Through the Interregnum, Milton often presents England, rescued from the trappings of a worldly monarchy, as an elect nation akin to the Old Testament Israel, and shows its leader, Oliver Cromwell, as a latter-day Moses. These views were bound up in Protestant views of the Millennium, which some sects, such as the Fifth Monarchists predicted would arrive in England. Milton, however, would later criticise the "worldly" millenarian views of these and others, and expressed orthodox ideas on the prophecy of the Four Empires.

The Restoration of the Stuart monarchy in 1660 began a new phase in Milton's work. In Paradise Lost, Paradise Regained and Samson Agonistes, Milton mourns the end of the godly Commonwealth. The Garden of Eden may allegorically reflect Milton's view of England's recent Fall from Grace, while Samson's blindness and captivity—mirroring Milton's own lost sight—may be a metaphor for England's blind acceptance of Charles II as king. Illustrated by Paradise Lost is mortalism, the belief that the soul lies dormant after the body dies.

Despite the Restoration of the monarchy, Milton did not lose his personal faith; Samson shows how the loss of national salvation did not necessarily preclude the salvation of the individual, while Paradise Regained expresses Milton's continuing belief in the promise of Christian salvation through Jesus Christ.

Though he maintained his personal faith in spite of the defeats suffered by his cause, the Dictionary of National Biography recounted how he had been alienated from the Church of England by Archbishop William Laud, and then moved similarly from the Dissenters by their denunciation of religious tolerance in England.

Milton had come to stand apart from all sects, though apparently finding the Quakers most congenial. He never went to any religious services in his later years. When a servant brought back accounts of sermons from nonconformist meetings, Milton became so sarcastic that the man at last gave up his place.

Writing of the enigmatic and often conflicting views of Milton in the Puritan age, David Daiches wrote,

Christian and Humanist, Protestant, patriot and heir of the golden ages of Greece and Rome, he faced what appeared to him to be the birth-pangs of a new and regenerate England with high excitement and idealistic optimism.

A fair theological summary may be that John Milton was a Puritan, though his tendency to press further for liberty of conscience, sometimes out of conviction and often out of mere intellectual curiosity, made the great man, at least, a vital if not uncomfortable ally in the broader Puritan movement.

=== Religious toleration ===
Milton called in the Areopagitica for "the liberty to know, to utter, and to argue freely according to conscience, above all liberties" to the conflicting Protestant denominations. According to American historian William Hunter, "Milton argued for disestablishment as the only effective way of achieving broad toleration. Rather than force a man's conscience, government should recognise the persuasive force of the gospel."

Scholarly interpretations have noted that Milton's argument in Areopagitica was not a simple endorsement of unrestricted freedom of expression; its conception of liberty was closely connected to religious conscience, intellectual inquiry, and the pursuit of truth.

=== Divorce ===
Milton wrote The Doctrine and Discipline of Divorce in 1643, at the beginning of the English Civil War. In August of that year, he presented his thoughts to the Westminster Assembly of Divines, which had been created by the Long Parliament to bring greater reform to the Church of England. The Assembly convened on 1 July against the will of King Charles I.

Milton's thinking on divorce caused him considerable trouble with the authorities. An orthodox Presbyterian view of the time was that Milton's views on divorce constituted a one-man heresy:

The fervently Presbyterian Edwards had included Milton's divorce tracts in his list in Gangraena of heretical publications that threatened the religious and moral fabric of the nation; Milton responded by mocking him as "shallow Edwards" in the satirical sonnet "On the New Forcers of Conscience under the Long Parliament", usually dated to the latter half of 1646.

Even here, though, his originality is qualified: Thomas Gataker had already identified "mutual solace" as a principal goal in marriage. Milton abandoned his campaign to legitimise divorce after 1645, but he expressed support for polygamy in the De Doctrina Christiana, the theological treatise that provides the clearest evidence for his views.

Milton wrote during a period when thoughts about divorce were anything but simplistic; rather, there was active debate among thinkers and intellectuals at the time. However, Milton's basic approval of divorce within strict parameters set by the biblical witness was typical of many influential Christian intellectuals, particularly the Westminster divines. Milton addressed the Assembly on the matter of divorce in August 1643, at a moment when the Assembly was beginning to form its opinion on the matter. In the Doctrine and Discipline of Divorce, Milton argued that divorce was a private matter, not a legal or ecclesiastical one. Neither the Assembly nor Parliament condemned Milton or his ideas. In fact, when the Westminster Assembly wrote the Westminster Confession of Faith they allowed for divorce ('Of Marriage and Divorce,' Chapter 24, Section 5) in cases of infidelity or abandonment. Thus, the Christian community, at least a majority within the 'Puritan' sub-set, approved of Milton's views.

Nevertheless, the reaction among Puritans to Milton's views on divorce was mixed. Herbert Palmer, a member of the Westminster Assembly, condemned Milton in the strongest possible language:

If any plead Conscience ... for divorce for other causes than Christ and His Apostles mention; Of which a wicked booke is abroad and uncensured, though deserving to be burnt, whose Author, hath been so impudent as to set his Name to it, and dedicate it to your selves ... will you grant a Toleration for all this?

— The Glasse of God's Providence Towards His Faithfull Ones, 1644, p. 54.

Palmer expressed his disapproval in a sermon addressed to the Westminster Assembly. The Scottish commissioner Robert Baillie described Palmer's sermon as one "of the most Scottish and free sermons that ever I heard anywhere".

=== History ===
History was particularly important for the political class of the period, and Lewalski considers that Milton "more than most illustrates" a remark of Thomas Hobbes on the weight placed at the time on the classical Latin historical writers Tacitus, Livy, Sallust and Cicero, and their republican attitudes. Milton himself wrote that "Worthy deeds are not often destitute of worthy relaters", in Book II of his History of Britain. A sense of history mattered greatly to him:

The course of human history, the immediate impact of the civil disorders, and his own traumatic personal life, are all regarded by Milton as typical of the predicament he describes as "the misery that has bin since Adam".

== Legacy and influence ==
Once Paradise Lost was published, Milton's stature as an epic poet was immediately recognised. He cast a formidable shadow over English poetry in the 18th and 19th centuries; he was often judged equal or superior to all other English poets, including Shakespeare. Very early on, though, he was championed by Whigs, and decried by Tories: with the regicide Edmund Ludlow he was claimed as an early Whig, while the High Tory Anglican minister Luke Milbourne lumped Milton in with other "Agents of Darkness" such as John Knox, George Buchanan, Richard Baxter, Algernon Sidney and John Locke. The political ideas of Milton, Locke, Sidney, and James Harrington strongly influenced the Radical Whigs, whose ideology in turn was central to the American Revolution. Modern scholars of Milton's life, politics, and work are known as Miltonists: "his work is the subject of a very large amount of academic scholarship".

In 2008, John Milton Passage, a short passage by Bread Street into St Mary-le-Bow Churchyard in London, was unveiled.

=== Early reception of the poetry ===
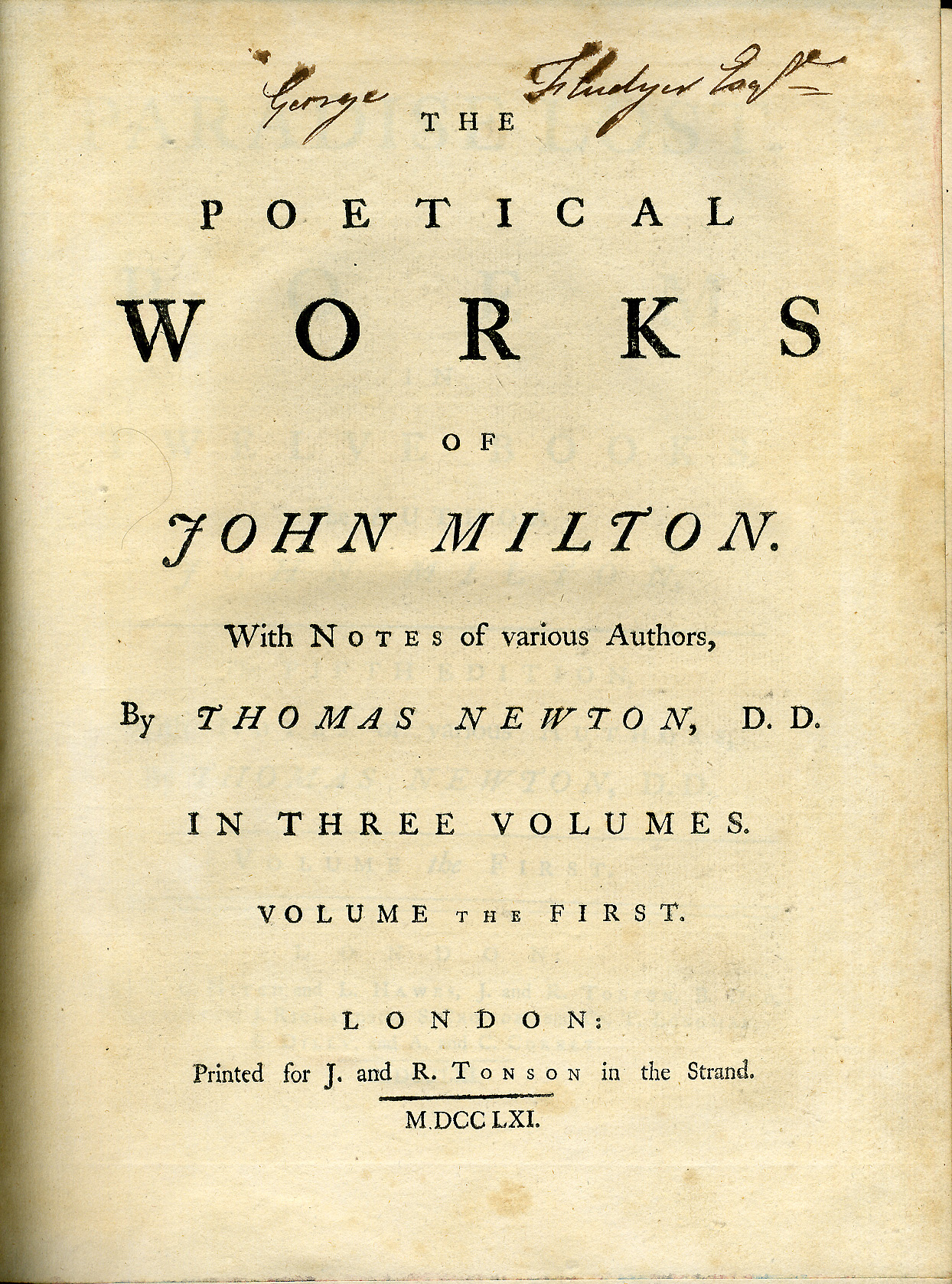
Title page of a 1752–1761 edition of "The Poetical Works of John Milton with Notes of Various Authors by Thomas Newton" printed by J. & R. Tonson in the Strand

John Dryden, an early enthusiast, in 1677 began the trend of describing Milton as the poet of the sublime. Dryden's The State of Innocence and the Fall of Man: an Opera (1677) is evidence of an immediate cultural influence. In 1695, Patrick Hume became the first editor of Paradise Lost, providing an extensive apparatus of annotation and commentary, particularly chasing down allusions.

In 1732, the classical scholar Richard Bentley offered a corrected version of Paradise Lost. Bentley was considered presumptuous and was attacked in the following year by Zachary Pearce. Christopher Ricks judges that, as a critic, Bentley was both acute and wrong-headed, and "incorrigibly eccentric"; William Empson also finds Pearce to be more sympathetic to Bentley's underlying line of thought than is warranted.

There was an early, partial translation of Paradise Lost into German by Theodore Haak and based on that a standard verse translation by Ernest Gottlieb von Berge. A subsequent prose translation by Johann Jakob Bodmer was very popular; it influenced Friedrich Gottlieb Klopstock. The German-language Milton tradition returned to England in the person of the artist Henry Fuseli.

Many Enlightenment thinkers of the 18th century revered and commented on Milton's poetry and non-poetical works. In addition to John Dryden, among them were Alexander Pope, Joseph Addison, Thomas Newton, and Samuel Johnson. For example, in The Spectator, Joseph Addison wrote extensive notes, annotations, and interpretations of certain passages of Paradise Lost. Jonathan Richardson, senior, and Jonathan Richardson, the younger, co-wrote a book of criticism. In 1749, Thomas Newton published an extensive edition of Milton's poetical works with annotations provided by himself, Dryden, Pope, Addison, the Richardsons (father and son) and others. Newton's edition of Milton was a culmination of the honour bestowed upon Milton by early Enlightenment thinkers; it may also have been prompted by Richard Bentley's infamous edition, described above. Samuel Johnson wrote numerous essays on Paradise Lost, and Milton was included in his Lives of the Most Eminent English Poets (1779–1781). In The Age of Louis XIV, Voltaire said "Milton remains the glory and the wonder (l'admiration) of England."

=== Artistic legacy ===
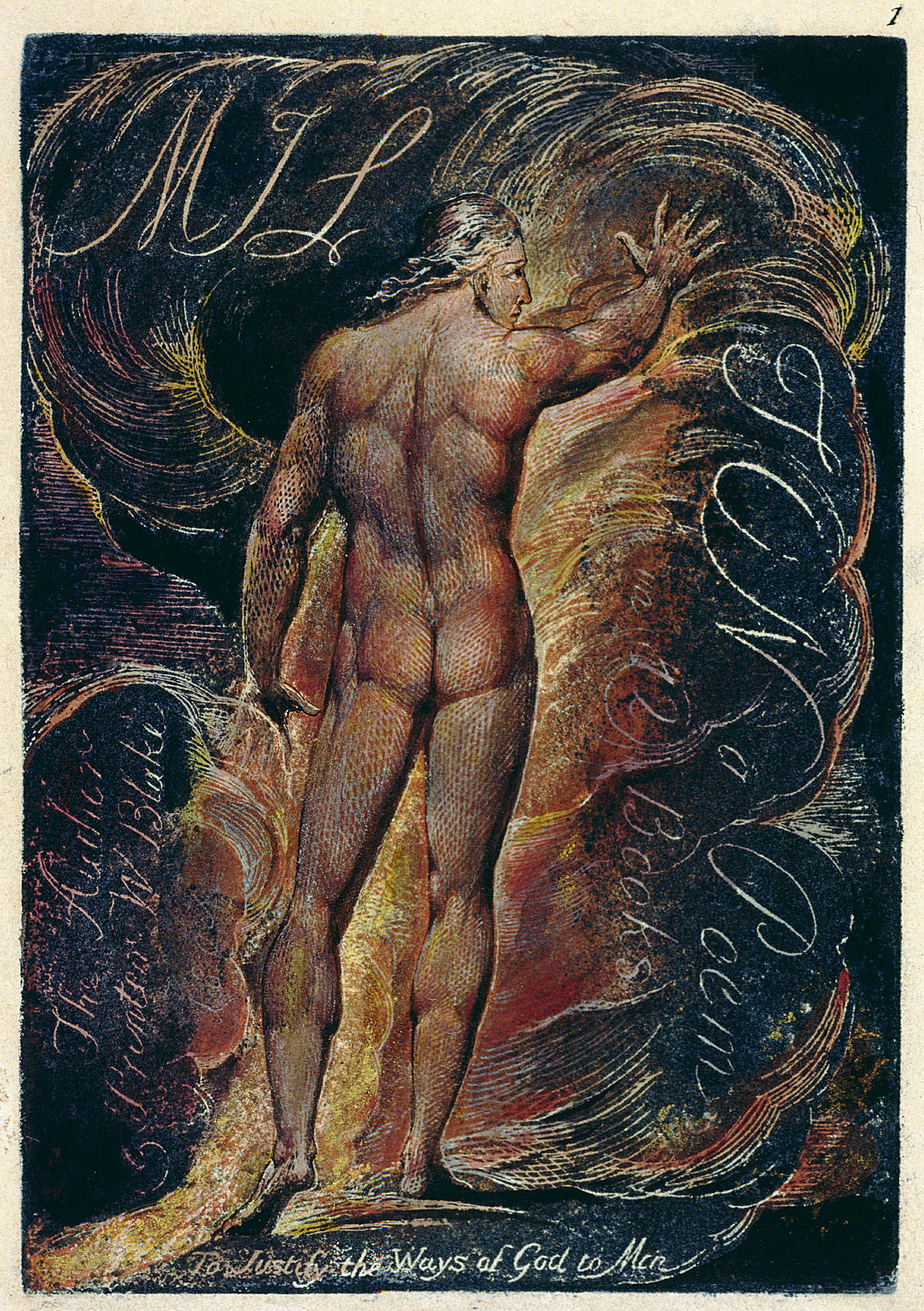
Frontispiece to Milton: A Poem in Two Books

William Blake is one of many artists who produced Milton's artistic legacy in the visual, plastic, and dramatic arts. Blake, a textual and visual artist, believed Milton to be a major English poet. Blake placed Edmund Spenser as Milton's precursor, and saw himself as Milton's poetical son. In his Milton: A Poem in Two Books, Blake uses Milton as a spiritual guide and a symbol of poetic inspiration.

=== Romantic theory ===
Edmund Burke was a theorist of the sublime, and he regarded Milton's description of Hell as exemplary of sublimity as an aesthetic concept. For Burke, it was to set alongside mountaintops, a storm at sea, and infinity. In The Beautiful and the Sublime, he wrote: "No person seems better to have understood the secret of heightening, or of setting terrible things, if I may use the expression, in their strongest light, by the force of a judicious obscurity than Milton."

The Romantic poets valued his exploration of blank verse, but for the most part rejected his religiosity. William Wordsworth began his sonnet "London, 1802" with "Milton! thou should'st be living at this hour" and modelled The Prelude, his own blank verse epic, on Paradise Lost. John Keats found the yoke of Milton's style uncongenial; he exclaimed that "Miltonic verse cannot be written but in an artful or rather artist's humour." Keats felt that Paradise Lost was a "beautiful and grand curiosity", but his own unfinished attempt at epic poetry, Hyperion, was unsatisfactory to the author because, amongst other things, it had too many "Miltonic inversions". In The Madwoman in the Attic, Sandra Gilbert and Susan Gubar note that Mary Shelley's novel Frankenstein is, in the view of many critics, "one of the key 'Romantic' readings of Paradise Lost."

=== Later legacy ===
The Victorian age witnessed a continuation of Milton's influence. Thomas Carlyle declared him the "moral king of English literature", while George Eliot and Thomas Hardy were particularly inspired by Milton's poetry and biography. Hostile 20th-century criticism by T. S. Eliot and Ezra Pound did not reduce Milton's stature. F. R. Leavis, in The Common Pursuit, responded to the points made by Eliot, in particular the claim that "the study of Milton could be of no help: it was only a hindrance", by arguing, "As if it were a matter of deciding not to study Milton! The problem, rather, was to escape from an influence that was so difficult to escape from because it was unrecognized, belonging, as it did, to the climate of the habitual and 'natural'." Harold Bloom, in The Anxiety of Influence, wrote that "Milton is the central problem in any theory and history of poetic influence in English [...]".

Milton's Areopagitica is still cited as relevant to the First Amendment to the United States Constitution. A quotation from Areopagitica—"A good book is the precious lifeblood of a master spirit, embalmed and treasured up on purpose to a life beyond life"—is displayed in many public libraries, including the New York Public Library.

The title of Philip Pullman's His Dark Materials trilogy is derived from a quotation, "His dark materials to create more worlds", line 915 of Book II in Paradise Lost. Pullman was concerned to produce a version of Milton's poem accessible to teenagers, and has spoken of Milton as "our greatest public poet".

Titles of a number of other well-known literary works are also derived from Milton's writings. Examples include Thomas Wolfe's Look Homeward, Angel, Aldous Huxley's Eyeless in Gaza, Arthur Koestler's Darkness at Noon, and William Golding's Darkness Visible.

T. S. Eliot believed that "of no other poet is it so difficult to consider the poetry simply as poetry, without our theological and political dispositions ... making unlawful entry".

=== Literary legacy ===
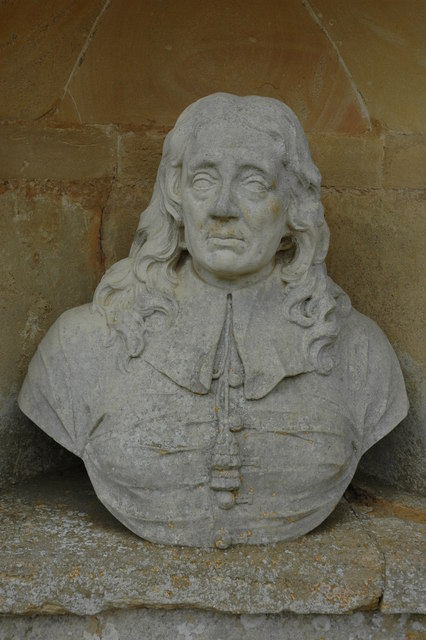
Milton is commemorated in the temple of British Worthies, Stowe, Buckinghamshire.

Milton's use of blank verse, in addition to his stylistic innovations (such as grandiloquence of voice and vision, peculiar diction and phraseology) influenced later poets. At the time, poetic blank verse was considered distinct from its use in verse drama, and Paradise Lost was taken as a unique exemplar. Said Isaac Watts in 1734, "Mr. Milton is esteemed the parent and author of blank verse among us". "Miltonic verse" might be synonymous for a century with blank verse as poetry, a new poetic terrain independent from both the drama and the heroic couplet.

Lack of rhyme was sometimes taken as Milton's defining innovation. He himself considered the rhymeless quality of Paradise Lost to be an extension of his own personal liberty:

This neglect then of Rhime ... is to be esteem'd an example set, the first in English, of ancient liberty recover'd to heroic Poem from the troublesom and modern bondage of Rimeing.

This pursuit of freedom was largely a reaction against conservative values entrenched within the rigid heroic couplet. Within a dominant culture that stressed elegance and finish, he granted primacy to freedom, breadth and imaginative suggestiveness, eventually developed into the romantic vision of sublime terror. Reaction to Milton's poetic worldview included, grudgingly, acknowledgement of the poet's resemblance to classical writers (Greek and Roman poetry being unrhymed). Blank verse came to be a recognised medium for religious works and for translations of the classics. Unrhymed lyrics like Collins' Ode to Evening (in the meter of Milton's translation of Horace's Ode to Pyrrha) were not uncommon after 1740.

A second aspect of Milton's blank verse was the use of unconventional rhythm:

His blank-verse paragraph, and his audacious and victorious attempt to combine blank and rhymed verse with paragraphic effect in Lycidas, lay down indestructible models and patterns of English verse-rhythm, as distinguished from the narrower and more strait-laced forms of English metre.

Before Milton, "the sense of regular rhythm ... had been knocked into the English head so securely that it was part of their nature". The "Heroick measure", according to Samuel Johnson, "is pure ... when the accent rests upon every second syllable through the whole line ... The repetition of this sound or percussion at equal times, is the most complete harmony of which a single verse is capable". Caesural pauses, most agreed, were best placed at the middle and the end of the line. In order to support this symmetry, lines were most often octo- or deca-syllabic, with no enjambed endings. To this schema Milton introduced modifications, which included hypermetrical syllables (trisyllabic feet), inversion or slighting of stresses, and the shifting of pauses to all parts of the line. Milton deemed these features to be reflective of "the transcendental union of order and freedom". Admirers remained hesitant to adopt such departures from traditional metrical schemes: "The English ... had been writing separate lines for so long that they could not rid themselves of the habit". Isaac Watts preferred his lines distinct from each other, as did Oliver Goldsmith, Henry Pemberton, and Scott of Amwell, whose general opinion it was that Milton's frequent omission of the initial unaccented foot was "displeasing to a nice ear". It was not until the late 18th century that poets (beginning with Gray) began to appreciate "the composition of Milton's harmony ... how he loved to vary his pauses, his measures, and his feet, which gives that enchanting air of freedom and wilderness to his versification". By the 20th century, American poet and critic John Hollander would go so far as to say that Milton "was able, by plying that most remarkable instrument of English meter ... to invent a new mode of image-making in English poetry."

Milton's pursuit of liberty extended into his vocabulary as well. It included many Latinate neologisms, as well as obsolete words already dropped from popular usage so completely that their meanings were no longer understood. In 1740, Francis Peck identified some examples of Milton's "old" words (now popular). The "Miltonian dialect", as it was called, was emulated by later poets; Pope used the diction of Paradise Lost in his Homer translation, while the lyric poetry of Gray and Collins was frequently criticised for their use of "obsolete words out of Spenser and Milton". The language of Thomson's finest poems (e.g. The Seasons, The Castle of Indolence) was self-consciously modelled after the Miltonian dialect, with the same tone and sensibilities as Paradise Lost. Following to Milton, English poetry from Pope to John Keats exhibited a steadily increasing attention to the connotative, the imaginative and poetic, value of words.

=== Musical settings ===
Milton's ode At a solemn Musick was set for choir and orchestra as Blest Pair of Sirens by Hubert Parry (1848–1918), and Milton's poem On the Morning of Christ's Nativity was set as a large-scale choral work by Cyril Rootham (1875–1938). Milton also wrote the hymn Let us with a gladsome mind, a versification of Psalm 136. His 'L'Allegro' and 'Il Penseroso', with additional material, were magnificently set by Handel (1740). Joseph Haydn drew on Paradise Lost as a basis when composing his oratorio The Creation (1798); Hector Berlioz absorbed Milton’s sublime, visionary drama, which shaped the scale and emotional intensity of his works; Robert Schumann admired Milton’s moral depth and inner psychological conflict, which influenced the literary tone of his Romantic aesthetic; and Franz Liszt found in Milton’s depictions of spiritual struggle and transcendence a powerful model for the philosophical scope of his symphonic poems and religious works.

== Works ==
=== Poetry and Drama ===
- Poems of Mr. John Milton, Both in English and Latin, Compos'ed at Several Times (1645), commonly known as Milton's 1645 Poems. The collection includes a (mostly English) section: On the Morning of Christ's Nativity (comp. ca. 1629); The Passion (comp. ca. 1630); Upon the Circumcision (comp. ca. 1633); L'Allegro (comp. 1630s); Il Penseroso (comp. 1630s); the sonnets I. O Nightingale, II. Donna leggiadra (Italian), III. Qual in colle (Italian), Canzone. Ridonsi donne (Italian), IV. Diodati e te'l dirò (Italian), V. Per certo (Italian), VI. Giovane piano (Italian); Arcades (comp. 1634), VII. "How Soon Hath Time," VIII. "Captain or Colonel," IX. "Lady that in the Prime," and X. "Daughter to that Good Earl"; Lycidas (comp. 1637; first published 1638); and A Mask Presented at Ludlow Castle, commonly known as Comus (first published 1634). The Latin section that follows this section comes with its own title page that includes Elegia I–VII, "Haec ego mente," "In Proditionem Bombardicam," "In eandem," "In eandem," In tandem," "In Inventorem Bombardae," "Ad Leonoram," "Ad tandem," and "Ad tandem."
- Paradise Lost (1667 in 10 books; 1674 in 12 books)
- Paradise Regain'd, A Poem in IV Books, To Which Is Added Samson Agonistes (1671), constitued of
  - Paradise Regained
  - Samson Agonistes
- Poems, &c. (1673). The collection includes the poems from Poems (1645) and additional works including "On the Death of a Fair Infant"; "At a Vacation Exercise"; the sonnets XI. "A Book Was Writ," XII. "I Did but Prompt the Age," XIII. "To Mr. Henry Lawes," XIV "When Faith and Love," XV. "On the Late Massacre in Piedmont" (comp. 1655), XVI. "When I Consider How My Light is Spent (comp. 1652-55), XVII. "Lawrence of Virtuous Father," XVIII. "Cyriack Whose Grandsire," and XIX. "Methought I Saw my Late Espoused Saint" (comp. 1658); "The Fifth Ode of Horace; and "On the New Forces of Conscience."

=== Prose ===
- Of Reformation (1641)
- Of Prelatical Episcopacy (1641)
- Animadversions (1641)
- The Reason of Church-Government Urged against Prelaty (1642)
- Apology for Smectymnuus (1642)
- Doctrine and Discipline of Divorce (1643)
- Judgement of Martin Bucer Concerning Divorce (1644)
- Of Education (1644)
- Areopagitica (1644)
- Tetrachordon (1645)
- Colasterion (1645)
- The Tenure of Kings and Magistrates (1649)
- Eikonoklastes (1649)
- Defensio pro Populo Anglicano (1651)
- Defensio Secunda (1654)
- A Treatise of Civil Power (1659)
- The Ready and Easy Way to Establish a Free Commonwealth (1660)
- The History of Britain (1670)
- Of True Religion (1673)
- Letters of State, [...] to Most of the Sovereign Princes and Republicks of Europe (1694, published posthumously).
- De Doctrina Christiana (1825, published posthumously, authorship disputed)

== Sources ==
- Beer, Anna. Milton: Poet, Pamphleteer and Patriot. New York: Bloomsbury Press, 2008.
- Campbell, Gordon and Corns, Thomas. John Milton: Life, Work, and Thought. Oxford: Oxford University Press, 2008.
- Chaney, Edward, The Grand Tour and the Great Rebellion: Richard Lassels and 'The Voyage of Italy' in the Seventeenth Century (Geneva, CIRVI, 1985) and "Milton's Visit to Vallombrosa: A literary tradition", The Evolution of the Grand Tour, 2nd ed (Routledge, London, 2000).
- Darbishire, Helen, ed. Life of Milton in The Early Lives of Milton. London: Constable, 1932.
- Dexter, Raymond. The Influence of Milton on English Poetry. London: Kessinger Publishing. 1922
- Dick, Oliver Lawson. Aubrey's Brief Lives. Harmondsworth, Middlesex: Penguin Books, 1962.
- Eliot, T. S. "Annual Lecture on a Master Mind: Milton", Proceedings of the British Academy 33 (1947).
- Fish, Stanley. Versions of Antihumanism: Milton and Others. Oxford: Oxford University Press, 2012. ISBN 978-1107003057.
- Flew, Antony (2008). "Milton, John (1608–1674)". In Hamowy, Ronald (ed.). Milton, John (1608–1674) - Archived copy. The Encyclopedia of Libertarianism. Thousand Oaks, CA: Sage; Cato Institute. pp. 331–332. ISBN 978-1412965804. Archived from the original on 9 January 2023.
- Gray, Thomas. Observations on English Metre. "The Works of Thomas Gray". ed. Mitford. London: William Pickering, 1835.
- Hawkes, David, John Milton: A Hero of Our Time (Counterpoint Press: London and New York, 2009) ISBN 1582434379
- Hill, Christopher. Milton and the English Revolution. London: Faber, 1977.
- Hobsbaum, Philip. "Meter, Rhythm and Verse Form". New York: Routledge, 1996.
- Hunter, William Bridges. A Milton Encyclopedia. Lewisburg: Bucknell University Press, 1980.
- Johnson, Samuel. "Rambler #86" 1751.
- Johnson, Samuel. Lives of the Most Eminent English Poets. London: Dove, 1826.
- Le Comte, Edward. Milton and Sex. London: Macmillan, 1978.
- Leonard, John. Faithful Labourers: A Reception History of Paradise Lost, 1667–1970. Oxford: Oxford University Press, 2013.
- Lewalski, Barbara K. The Life of John Milton. Oxford: Blackwells Publishers, 2003.
- A History of the County of Oxford: Volume 5: Bullingdon Hundred. 1957. pp. 122–134.
- Masson, David. The Life of John Milton and History of His Time, Vol. 1. Oxford: 1859.
- McCalman, Iain. et al., An Oxford Companion to the Romantic Age: British Culture, 1776–1832. Oxford: Oxford University Press, 2001.
- Milner, Andrew. John Milton and the English Revolution: A Study in the Sociology of Literature. London: Macmillan, 1981.
- Milton, John. Complete Prose Works 8 Vols. gen. ed. Don M. Wolfe. New Haven: Yale University Press, 1959.
- Milton, John. The Verse, "Paradise Lost". London, 1668.
- Peck, Francis. "New Memoirs of Milton". London, 1740.
- Pfeiffer, Robert H. "The Teaching of Hebrew in Colonial America", The Jewish Quarterly Review (April 1955).
- Rosenfeld, Nancy. The Human Satan in Seventeenth-Century English Literature: From Milton to Rochester. Aldershot: Ashgate, 2008.
- Saintsbury, George. "The Peace of the Augustans: A Survey of Eighteenth-Century Literature as a Place of Rest and Refreshment". London: G. Bell and Sons, Ltd. 1916.
- Saintsbury, George. "A History of English Prosody: From the Twelfth Century to the Present Day". London: Macmillan and Co., 1908.
- Scott, John. "Critical Essays". London, 1785.
- Stephen, Leslie (1902). "New Lights on Milton" . Studies of a Biographer. Vol. 4. London: Duckworth & Co. pp. 86–129.
- Sullivan, Ceri. Literature in the Public Service: Divine Bureaucracy (2013).
- von Maltzahn, Nicholas. "Milton's Readers" in The Oxford Companion to Milton. ed. Dennis Richard Danielson, Oxford: Oxford University Press, 1999.
- Watts, Isaac. "Miscellaneous Thoughts" No. lxxiii. Works 1810
- Wedgwood, C. V. Thomas Wentworth, First Earl of Strafford 1593–1641. New York: Macmillan, 1961.
- Wilson, A. N. The Life of John Milton. Oxford: Oxford University Press, 1983.
