= Luke Milbourne =

English clergyman

Luke Milbourne or Milbourn (1649–1720) was an English clergyman, known as a High Church supporter of Henry Sacheverell, and also as a critic and poet.

== Life ==
He was the son of Luke Milbourne (1622–1668), an ejected minister who was the incumbent of Wroxhall, Warwickshire, where he was born. His mother's name was Phœbe. The antiquarian John Nelson states that the family lived at Newington Green, well known for its dissenting academies, where they kept a boarding school; Phoebe taught, because her husband was barred from doing so.

The younger Luke was educated at Pembroke Hall, Cambridge, where he matriculated in 1667, and graduated B.A. in 1670. After graduating he appears to have held chaplaincies to the English merchants at Hamburg and at St Mary's Church, Rotterdam.

He was afterwards at Harwich, and was beneficed in the beginning of William III's reign at Great Yarmouth. There he associated much with Rowland Davies, later dean of Cork, and wrote a lampoon on the town, entitled Ostia. In 1688 he had become lecturer of St Leonard's, Shoreditch, and in 1704 he succeeded Samuel Harris as rector of St Ethelburga's Bishopsgate. He is 'the priest of the church of England and rector of a church in the city of London' who, in a published Letter (1713) to Roger Laurence, author of Lay Baptism Invalid, rejected the validity of lay baptism by the authority of Calvin and of French Protestant writers.

Many of his numerous printed sermons touched on the martyrdom of Charles I, and enforcing the duty of passive obedience. After listening to one of Milbourne's high-flying sermons in January 1713, Bishop White Kennett asked indignantly 'why he did not stay in Holland?’ and 'why he is suffered to stay in England?’

He died in London 15 April 1720.

== Critic ==
Milbourne is mainly remembered on account of his strictures on John Dryden's translation of Virgil, and of the retaliation made upon him both by Dryden, and by Alexander Pope on Dryden's behalf. He was coupled with Sir Richard Blackmore in Pope's An Essay on Criticism as the type of all that is contemptible in a critic.

Milbourne attempted an English rendering of Virgil before Dryden. According to an advertisement Milbourne had then issued The First Book of Virgil's Æneis made English. No copy may be now known. Dryden's translation appeared in 1697, and its success inspired Milbourne's attack on it. In order to demonstrate his own superiority, Milbourne supplemented criticisms by specimens of his own translation of the first and fourth Eclogues and the first Georgic. Dryden complained in the preface to the Fables (1700) that his critic's scurrility was unprovoked. One of Milbourne's avowed reasons for not sparing Dryden was that Dryden had never spared a clergyman. Dryden replied that if he had fallen foul of the priesthood he had only to ask pardon of good priests, and was afraid Milbourne's 'part of the reparation would come to little.' 'I am satisfied,’ he concludes, 'that while he and I live together I shall not be thought the worst poet of the age.' The morals of Milbourne, who, according to Dryden, had lost his living for libelling his parishioners, were severely handled in a poem entitled The Pacificator, 1699.

== Works ==
He contributed Latin verses to Lacrymæ Cantabrigienses, 1670, on the death of Henrietta, Duchess of Orleans. Milbourne's other works, apart from 31 single sermons and some tracts, are:

- 'A Short Defence of the Order of the Church of England, by a Presbyter of the Diocese of Norwich' (anon.), 1688.
- 'Mysteries in Religion vindicated, or the Filiation, Deity, and Satisfaction of our Saviour asserted against Socinians and others, with occasional reflections on several late pamphlets,’ London, 1692.
- A metrical version of 'The Imitation of Christ,’ entitled 'The Christian Pattern Paraphrased,’ 1697.
- 'The Psalms of David in English Metre,’ 1698.
- 'Tom of Bedlam's answer to his Brother, Ben Hoadly,’ 1709.
- 'The Moderate Cabal, a Satyr in Verse,’ 1710 (anon.).
- 'The Two Wolves in Lamb's Skins, or Old Eli's sorrowful Lamentations over his two Sons,’ 1716.
- 'A Legacy to the Church of England, vindicating her Orders from the Objections of Papists and Dissenters,’ 2 vols. London, 1722, (posthumous).

== Family ==
A son, Thomas Milbourne, was fellow of St John's College, Cambridge, and died in October 1743.
