= Arcades (Milton) =

1634 masque by John Milton

Arcades is a masque written by John Milton and performed on 4 May 1634. The piece was written to celebrate the character of Alice Spencer, the Countess Dowager of Derby, widow of Ferdinando Stanley, 5th Earl of Derby, during her 75th birthday. The masque distinguishes Spencer as superior to other noble women by titling her queen of a metaphorical Arcadia. The piece served as a basis for Milton's later masque, Comus.

== Background ==
Spencer's family invited Milton to write a masque for a celebration to honour her on her 75th birthday, 4 May 1634. This arrangement was made possible through the intervention of Henry Lawes, the Earl's music tutor for his children, and friend to Milton's father. Milton wrote Arcades and the piece was performed at the Harefield estate. This masque established many themes and ideas later developed in his other masque, Comus.

== Masque ==
The masque begins by praising the countess and describes her in royal terms during the first song:

Mark what radiant state she spreads,
In circle round her shining throne
Shooting her beams like silver threads:
this, this is she alone,
Sitting like a goddess bright,
In the center of her light

— lines 14–19

Genius continues this idea and emphasizes that she was:

the great mistress of yong princely shrine,
Whom with low reverence I adore as mine,

— lines 36–37

According to Genius, sirens, similar to the muses, create a music that fills the senses:

But else in deep of night when drowsiness
Hath locked up mortal sense, then listen I
To the celestial sirens' harmony

— lines 61–63

Genius describes how he, unlike mortals, is able to hear the song of the sirens and the song compelled him to an innocent rapture along with the Fates who are also seduced by the siren song:

Such sweet compulsion doth in music lie,
To lull the daughters of Necessity,
And keep unsteady Nature to her law,
and the low world in measured motion draw
After the heavenly tune, which none can hear
Of human mold with gross unpurged ear;
And yet such music worthiest were to blaze
The peerless height of her immortal praise,

— lines 68–75

Her magnificence is further distinguished from any others during the second song:

Such a rural queen
All Arcadia hath not seen.

— lines 94–95

This is compounded by the third song declaring that other queens are below her status and concluding the masque:

Here ye shall have greater grace,
To serve the Lady of this place.
Though Syrinx your Pan's mistress were,
Yet Syrinx well might wait on her.
Such a rural queen
All Arcadia hath not seen.

— lines 104–109

== Themes ==
Arcades sought to draw upon pastoral elements and mocked the pastoral Caroline traditions of Henrietta Maria of France. Instead of following traditional themes inherent in the genre that welcome guests, the guest characters in the masque seek to praise the Countess who is guided by the spirit Genius. Genius is not a unique figure in Miltonic poetry and he is similar to a demon or Thyrsis in Comus because he relies on divine music for an earthly purpose.

The masque portrays a powerful female character at the centre of the plot. Although he does not say that she is part of the surrounding social context, especially one that could be seen in a negative light, she does have direct connections to classical female divinities, such as Cybele and Latona, who have established divine families. The female figure is not only a mother of her family; she is also mother of a greater version of Arcady. In her position, the people and spirits of the land honour her for her greatness.
