= Of Prelatical Episcopacy =

1641 religious tract by John Milton

Of Prelatical Episcopacy is a religious tract written by John Milton in either June or July 1641.

== Background ==
The tract, the shortest of Milton's tracts on prelatical issues, was written as a response to many works, such as Archbishop James Ussher's The Judgement of Doctor Rainoldes Touching the Originall of Episcopacy (25 May 1641). The tract was printed soon after, in either June or July 1641, under the title Of Prelatical Episcopacy, and Whether it may be deduc'd from the Apostolical times by vertue of those Testimonies which are alledg'd to that purpose in some late Treatises: One wherof goes under the Name of Iames Arch-Bishop of Armagh.

== Tract ==
The tract is a direct response to other tracts and is hostile to any need for a medium between the Bible and the individual reader, especially from such mediums as provided by an organized church. Instead, Milton says that such individuals are unnecessary because we must have "first the Gospell our rule, and Oracle". Reading from the Bible, according to Milton, would teach us that there is not a "difference betweene a Bishop, and a Prebyter". Any misreading of the text is the fault of the reader who is unable to understand the Scriptural truth or who was misled by other works. In particular, there are many older works that mislead readers, especially in their interpretations and claims about the meaning of Scriptural words:

Now for the word [proestos], it is more likely that "Timothy" never knew the word in that sense: it was the vanity of those next succeeding times not to content themselves with the simplicity of Scripture phrase, but must make a next Lexicon to name themselves by.

During the tract, Milton discusses Ignatius's epistles and claims that some were faked:

Now come the Epistles of "Ignatius" to shew us first, that "Onesimus" was Bishop of "Ephesus"; next to assert the difference of "Bishop" and "Presbyter", wherein I wonder that men teachers of the Protestant Religion, make no difficulty of imposing upon our belie a supposititious ofspring of some dozen Epistles, whereof five are rejected as suprious, containing in them Heresies and trifles, which cannot agree in Chronologie with "Ignatius", entitling him Arch-Bishop of "Antioch Theopolis", which name of "Theopolis" that City had not till "Justinian's" time long after, as "Cedrenus" mentions, which argues both the barbarous time, and the unskillfull fraud of him that foisted this Epistle upon "Ignatius".

== Themes ==
The purpose of Of Prelatical Episcopacy is, to Elizabeth Wheeler, that it "reminds readers that truth is attainable, and that all nonscriptural authority - including their own - is fallible. Truth is the prize, but confusion and distraction will be the risk one encounters along the way."

Thomas Corns believes that Of Prelatical Episcopacy is an example of the way Milton relies on a writing system in which "his main clauses often support lots of subordinate clauses, and subordinate clauses often themselves support a number of clauses dependent upon them". That is not to say that this causes problems, and the discussion of Ignatius's epistles, as Corns continues, "is a sentence of over a hundred words, no great rarity in the prose of Milton or many of his contemporaries, though this one (like so many in Milton) is beautifully organized and controlled."
