= Let us with a gladsome mind =

Christian hymn by John Milton and John Antes

- Genre: Hymn
- Written: 1623
- Text: John Milton
- Based on: Psalm 136
- Meter: 7.7.7.7
- Melody: "Monkland" by John Bernard Wilkes

Let us with a gladsome mind is a hymn written in 1623 by John Milton, a pupil at St. Paul's School, at the age of 15 as a paraphrase of Psalm 136. It was set to music as the hymn tune known as Monkland by the organist John Bernard Wilkes using a melody written by John Antes.

== Lyrics ==
Let us with a gladsome mind
Praise the Lord, for he is kind,
For his mercies aye endure,
Ever faithful, ever sure.
