= Defensio Secunda =

1654 political tract by John Milton

Defension Secunda was a 1654 political tract by the English polemicist John Milton. It was a sequel to his Defensio pro Populo Anglicano. It is a defence of the Parliamentary regime, then controlled by Oliver Cromwell; and also a defense Milton's own reputation against a royalist tract published under the name Salmasius in 1652, and other criticism lodged against him.

In the work, Milton argues for the right of the individual against the control of a government or a religious authority. He also attacks the concept of titles and other forms of pomposity, a theme that reoccurs later in the figure of Satan from his Paradise Lost. Besides discussing his views on politics, Milton includes autobiographical texts in the tract, explaining to his readers his experiences in early life and his educational background.

== Background ==
Only a few months after Cromwell was made Lord Protector over England, Milton published a tract titled Pro Populo Anglicano Defensio Secunda. The work was one of the last times that Milton discussed Cromwell's character. It is a defence of the Parliamentary regime, controlled by Cromwell, and sought the support of a European audience. In addition to this purpose, the work serves as a reply to the attacks on his Doctrine and Discipline of Divorce by Herbert Palmer and attacks on his Defensio pro Populo Anglicano by Salmasius. A further anonymous pamphlet attack from the royalist side, Regii sanguinis clamor ad coelum, he rebutted with an ad hominem attack on Alexander Morus, whom Milton wrongly took to be the actual author (who was in fact Pierre Du Moulin). Milton used scurrilous gossip against Morus; scholars have decided that his sources of the scandal were at least reasonably accurate.

However, the act of writing further strained his failing eyes, to the extent that he could no longer rely on his sight.

== Tract ==
Milton begins his work by addressing claiming to fight for truth and freedom who will help reform Europe:

"I have in the First Defence spoken out and shall in the Second speak again to the entire assembly and council of all the most influential men, cities, and nations everywhere".

He continues by discussing parts of his life, and explains why he writes instead of fighting as a soldier:

"I did not avoid the toils and dangers of military service without rendering to my fellow citizens another kind of service that was much more useful and no less perilous".

After defending why he writes, Milton explains his purpose in writing:

It is the renewed cultivation of freedom and civic life that I disseminate throughout cities, kingdoms, and nations. But not entirely unknown, nor perhaps unwelcome, shall I return if I am he who disposed of the contentious satellite of tyrants, hitherto deemed unconquerable, both in the view of most men and in his own opinion. When he with insults was attacking us and our battle array, and our leaders looked first of all to me, I met him in single combat and plunged into his reviling throat this pen, the weapon of his choice.

After Milton was accused of being a worse person than Cromwell, he wrote in the work that it was "the highest praise you could bestow on me". Later in the tract, Milton discusses his Areopagitica and argues that in the work, he warns against the idea of truth being determined by a limited few. Milton also discusses his early divorce tracts, claiming that they were a discussion of religious freedom, domestic freedom, and civil freedom, the "three varieties of liberty without which civilized life is scarcely possible".

== Themes ==
Milton, through his work, becomes a defender of the individual against the control of a government or religious authority. He also attacks the concept of titles and other forms of pomp, a theme that reoccurs later in the figure of Satan from his Paradise Lost. Besides discussing his views on politics, Milton dwells on parts of his biography, including a description of his early years with education and literature.
