= Of True Religion =

1673 work by John Milton

Of True Religion, Heresy, Schism, Toleration; and what best means may be used against the Growth of Popery
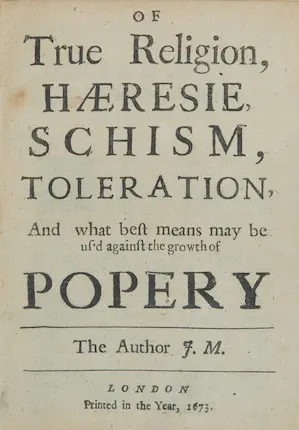
- Title page
- Author: John Milton
- Language: English
- Publication date: 1673
- Publication place: England
- Media type: Print

Of True Religion, Heresy, Schism, Toleration; and what best means may be used against the Growth of Popery is an Anti-Catholic polemical tract by John Milton, first published in London in 1673. The tract addresses Milton's own problems with the doctrines, practices, and ceremonies associated with the Pope or the papal system of the Roman Catholic Church and, with what Milton called, the implicit faith of its members. The anti-Catholic ideas in Milton's writing are in direct response to the tolerant stance of King Charles II of England toward the Roman Catholic Church. Pro-Catholic sentiments had not been popular in England since the reign of the Roman Catholic queen Mary I of England.

== Content ==
Milton accuses the Roman Catholic Church of blatantly changing scripture and of blindly leading gullible members astray. He argues that the Catholic Church's reliance on popery is false religion and uses that as evidence of heresy within the institution. Milton begins his argument with the claim that "the increase of popery is at this day no small trouble and offence to the greatest part of the nation."

Milton continues his argument by juxtaposing the supposed errors of the Catholic Church with his own definition of "true religion." He maintains that true religion "is the true worship and service of God, learnt and believed from the word of God only." Milton also suggests that members of the Roman Catholic Church live by a system of implicit faith. He proposes a solution to the problem, stating that two principles of true religion would "cut off many debates and contentions, schisms, and persecutions" between Christians.

=== Two Principles ===
In his tract, John Milton frequently cited Biblical passages as evidence against the Catholic Church. Milton quoted from the books of Deuteronomy (Deut. 4:2) and Revelation (Rev. 22:18,19) and argued that the two main principles of true religion were (1) the word of God only, and (2) "that faith ought not to be an implicit faith, that is to believe, though as the church believes, against or without express authority of scripture."

== Historical context ==
Milton wrote his pamphlet in 1673, one year before his death. With his greatest works behind him, Milton could focus on his current state and the condition of his country. He had studied the consequences of the state-run Church of England and believed in the separation of church and state.

Milton was a witness of the unpopularity of King Charles II's tolerance of Catholics. Charles II had promulgated the declaration of indulgence (which had suspended the penalties for Catholicism and nonconformity) in March 1672, but had been forced to rescind it in March 1673. "Milton's tract is tolerant of the sectarians, who ‘may have some errors, but are not heretics’, but mounts a strong attack on Roman Catholicism, which he denounces as politically dangerous and theologically idolatrous." Because his views seemed to contradict even mainstream ideas such as trinitarianism, it did not receive much attention during his lifetime. However, they would later influence future parliamentary issues like the Popery Act 1698. His writings later became wildly popular to the future revolutionary movements in France and America.
