= Animadversions =

Third of John Milton's antiprelatical tracts

Animadversions is the third of John Milton's antiprelatical tracts, in the form of a response to the works and claims of Bishop Joseph Hall. The tract was published in July 1641 under the title Animadversions upon The Remonstrants Defence Against Smectymnuus.

== Tract ==
The tract is a direct, personal attack upon Hall through use of satire and other methods such as mockery: "Ha, ha, ha". Animadversion, literally a drawing of attention to material, was a common enough choice of pamphleteers of the time, in which writings of the opponent were quoted at some length (but selectively), and replied to in extended form and with polemic intention. Milton's technique with the quotation and response leads to a dialogue form.

Milton's focus is on Hall's views of church, liturgy, and scripture, in order to refute Hall's belief that the word of God must be mediated through a church government. In particular, Milton argues for a freedom of speech that allows one to attain the "light of grace". To Milton, the Bible is the best way to connect to God, and church governments that attained their authority in ancient times may lack any current authority:

But hee that shall bind himselfe to make Antiquity his rule, if hee read but part, besides the difficulty of choyce, his rule is deficient, and utterly unsatisfying; for there may bee other Writers of another mind which hee hath not seene, and if hee undertake all, the length of mans life cannot extent to give him a full and requisite knowledge of what was done in Antiquity.

Milton continues to attack the authority of church governments and liturgies by emphasizing how an individual's reading of the Bible is more important than other considerations, and that personal prayers are more important than ancient forms of worship because the individual feels what he is thinking. The only type of religious structure that can work is a direct relationship between a preacher and a congregation without any set forms or rituals and with the preacher serving as a minister to the people.

== Themes ==
Thomas Kranidas believes that Milton was focusing on persons, not theory, and claims that the "chief argument was not in fact 'Believe this ', but rather 'Believe me '".
