= 1643 in literature =

This article presents lists of the literary events and publications in 1643.

== Events ==
- May/June – René Descartes, having had his philosophy condemned by the University of Utrecht, begins his long correspondence with Princess Elizabeth of Bohemia.
- June 16 – The Parliament of England issues the Licensing Order of 1643 to control the press – the action against which John Milton protests in his Areopagitica of the following year.
- August 1 – The first of Milton's divorce tracts is published, anonymously and unlicensed.
- unknown dates
  - Cardinal Mazarin opens the Bibliothèque Mazarine in Paris to scholars.
  - The medieval Icelandic manuscript Codex Regius comes to light, in the possession of Bishop Brynjólfur Sveinsson.
  - Miyamoto Musashi begins dictating The Book of Five Rings (Go Rin No Sho).
  - Francis Bacon's New Atlantis and Tommaso Campanella's Civitas Solis, The City of the Sun, are published together in a volume titled Mundus Alter et Idem – the first time, though not the last, that the two works will be bound together.

== New books ==
=== Prose ===
- Pedro Agerre (Axular) – Gero
- Sir Thomas Browne – Religio Medici (first "authorized" edition, after two unauthorized in the previous year)
- Sir Kenelm Digby – Observations Upon Religio Medici
- Philip Hunton – A Treatise of Monarchie
- John Milton – Doctrine and Discipline of Divorce
- Richard Overton - Man's Mortality
- Henry Parker
  - The Contra-Replicant, his complaint to his majestie
  - A political catechism
  - The Oath of Pacification
  - To the High Court of Parliament: the humble remonstrance of the Company of Stationers
- Roger Williams – A Key into the Language of America

=== Drama ===
- Pierre Corneille
  - Le Menteur
  - Polyeucte
- Sir William Davenant – The Unfortunate Lovers published
- Claude de L'Estoile – La Belle Esclave (The Beautiful Slave)
- Francisco de Quevedo
  - Entremés de las sombras
  - La mujer de Peribáñez

=== Poetry ===
- Ramillete gracioso
- Antoine Girard de Saint-Amant – Albion

== Births ==
- March 26 – Louis Moréri, French encyclopedist and priest (died 1680)
- September 18 – Gilbert Burnet, Scottish historian and bishop (died 1715)
- November 1 – John Strype, English historian, biographer and cleric (died 1737)
- November 16 – Jean Chardin, French travel writer (died 1713)
- unknown date – Thomas Rymer, English Historiographer Royal (died 1713)

== Deaths ==
- February 9 – Sidney Godolphin, English poet (born 1610)
- April 4 – Simon Episcopius, Dutch theologian (born 1583)
- April 12 – Nicolaus Hunnius, German theologian (born 1585)
- April 20 – Christoph Demantius, German poet and composer (born 1567)
- November 29 – William Cartwright, English poet, dramatist and cleric (born 1611)
- unknown dates
  - Abraham Azulai, Moroccan-born Kabbalistic author (born c. 1570)
  - Thomas Master, English poet, translator and cleric (born 1603)
  - Pedro de Oña, Chilean poet (born 1570)
- probable
  - Mícheál Ó Cléirigh, Irish chronicler (born c. 1590)
  - Henry Glapthorne, English dramatist (born 1610)
