= Milton's divorce tracts =

Pamphlets by John Milton

Milton's divorce tracts refer to the four interlinked polemical pamphlets—The Doctrine and Discipline of Divorce, The Judgment of Martin Bucer, Tetrachordon, and Colasterion—written by John Milton from 1643 to 1645. They argue for the legitimacy of divorce on grounds of spousal incompatibility. Arguing for divorce at all, let alone a version of no-fault divorce, was extremely controversial and religious figures sought to ban his tracts. Although the tracts were met with nothing but hostility and he later rued publishing them in English at all, they are important for analysing the relationship between Adam and Eve in his epic Paradise Lost. Spanning three years characterised by turbulent changes in the English printing business, they also provide an important context for the publication of Areopagitica, Milton's most famous work of prose.

Within a few years of the controversy that surrounded Milton, the contentious nature of the issue had settled. The Westminster Confession of Faith, which was written between 1643 and 1652 by contemporaries of Milton, allows for divorce in cases of infidelity and abandonment (Chapter 24, Section 5). Milton had addressed the Westminster Assembly of divines, the group who wrote the Confession, in August 1643.

== Context ==
The immediate spark for Milton's writing of the tracts was his desertion by his newly married wife, Mary Powell. In addition to the testimony of early biographers, critics have detected Milton's personal psychosexual situation in passages of The Doctrine and Discipline of Divorce. However, Milton's commonplace book reveals that he had been thinking about divorce beforehand, a fact that qualifies the biographical explanation.

The broader context lay in the hope that Parliament would reform England's virtually nonexistent divorce laws, which was unusual for a Protestant country. Having inherited Catholic canon law, England had no formal mechanisms for divorce (as in Catholicism, marriages could be annulled on the basis of preexisting impediments, like consanguinity or impotence, or separations could be obtained). However, divorce may have been unofficially condoned in cases of desertion or adultery. On the whole, England remained "the worst of all worlds, largely lacking either formal controls over marriage or satisfactory legal means of breaking it".

== Argument ==
Opposed to Scriptural authority Matthew 19:3–9, much of Milton's argument hangs on his view of human nature and the purpose of marriage, which rather than the traditional ends of procreation or a remedy against fornication, he defines as "the apt and cheerful conversation of man with woman, to comfort and refresh him against the evils of solitary life". Milton argues that if a couple be "mistak'n in their dispositions through any error, concealment, or misadventure" for them "spight of antipathy to fadge together, and combine as they may to their unspeakable wearisomnes and despaire of all sociable delight" violates the purpose of marriage as mutual companionship.

=== Doctrine and Discipline of Divorce ===
The full title of the first pamphlet is The Doctrine and Discipline of Divorce: Restor'd to the Good of Both Sexes, From the Bondage of Canon Law. Its first edition was printed in August 1643, and then a much expanded, also unlicensed second edition came out in 1644. Editors debate how to present The Doctrine and Discipline of Divorce to modern readers, since the second edition's amplifications nearly characterise it as a separate argument, and a less personal one at that. Though Milton's full name appeared on neither title page, he did sign the epistle "To the Parlament of England" added to the second edition. He was denounced in a sermon given before Parliament in August 1644 by preacher Herbert Palmer, and was rebuked by others including William Prynne in print. An anonymous pamphlet appeared in November 1644 that vigorously attacked Milton's argument. Milton argued that Christ did not abrogate the Mosaic permission for divorce found in Deuteronomy 24:1, because in Matthew 19, he was specifically addressing the Pharisees. The book saw two further publications in 1645, although it appears that one of them was the work of piracy.

=== Judgment of Martin Bucer ===
Published in July 1644, Judgment of Martin Bucer consists mostly of Milton's translations of pro-divorce arguments from the De Regno Christi of the German Protestant reformer Martin Bucer. By finding support for his views among Protestant writers, Milton hoped to sway the members of Parliament and Protestant ministers who had condemned him. Among Milton's divorce tracts, this is the only one that obtained a prepublication licence.

=== Tetrachordon ===
Tetrachordon appeared in March 1645, after Milton had published his defence of free speech, Areopagitica, in the interim. The title means "four-stringed" in Greek, implying that Milton was able to harmonise the four Scriptural passages dealing with divorce: Genesis 1:27–28, Deuteronomy 24:1, Matthew 5:31–32 and 19:2–9, and I Corinthians 7:10–16. Milton suggests that the secondary law of nature permits divorce in the post-lapsarian world. This tract is the largest and most ponderous of Milton's arguments of divorce, consisting of over 100 pages. Its Scriptural emphasis anticipates that of De Doctrina Christiana.

=== Colasterion ===
Meaning "rod of punishment" in Greek, the brief Colasterion was published along with Tetrachordon in March 1645 in response to an anonymous pamphlet attacking the first edition of The Doctrine and Discipline of Divorce. Milton makes no new arguments, but harshly takes to task the "trivial author".

== Aftermath ==
In August 1643, Milton addressed the Westminster Assembly on the matter of divorce, arguing that it was a private matter. Despite the contentious nature of the topic, the Assembly and Parliament did not censure him; in fact, the Assembly, which acted with the full authority of Parliament in religious matters, allowed for divorce in the Confession of Faith ('Of Marriage and Divorce,' Chapter 24, Section 5) in cases of infidelity or abandonment.

The Westminster Confession of Faith states: 'Adultery or fornication, committed after a contract, being detected before marriage, giveth just occasion to the innocent party to dissolve that contract. In the case of adultery after marriage, it is lawful for the innocent party to sue out a divorce, and after the divorce to marry another, as if the offending party were dead.'

The Assembly was a broad representation of the 'Puritan' community in Britain at that time. 120 members were leaders in the Church of England, 30 were lay delegates and 6 were commissioners from the Church of Scotland.

== See also ==
- Biblical exegesis
- Christian views on divorce
- English Reformation
