= Freedom of speech =

Right to communicate one's opinions and ideas

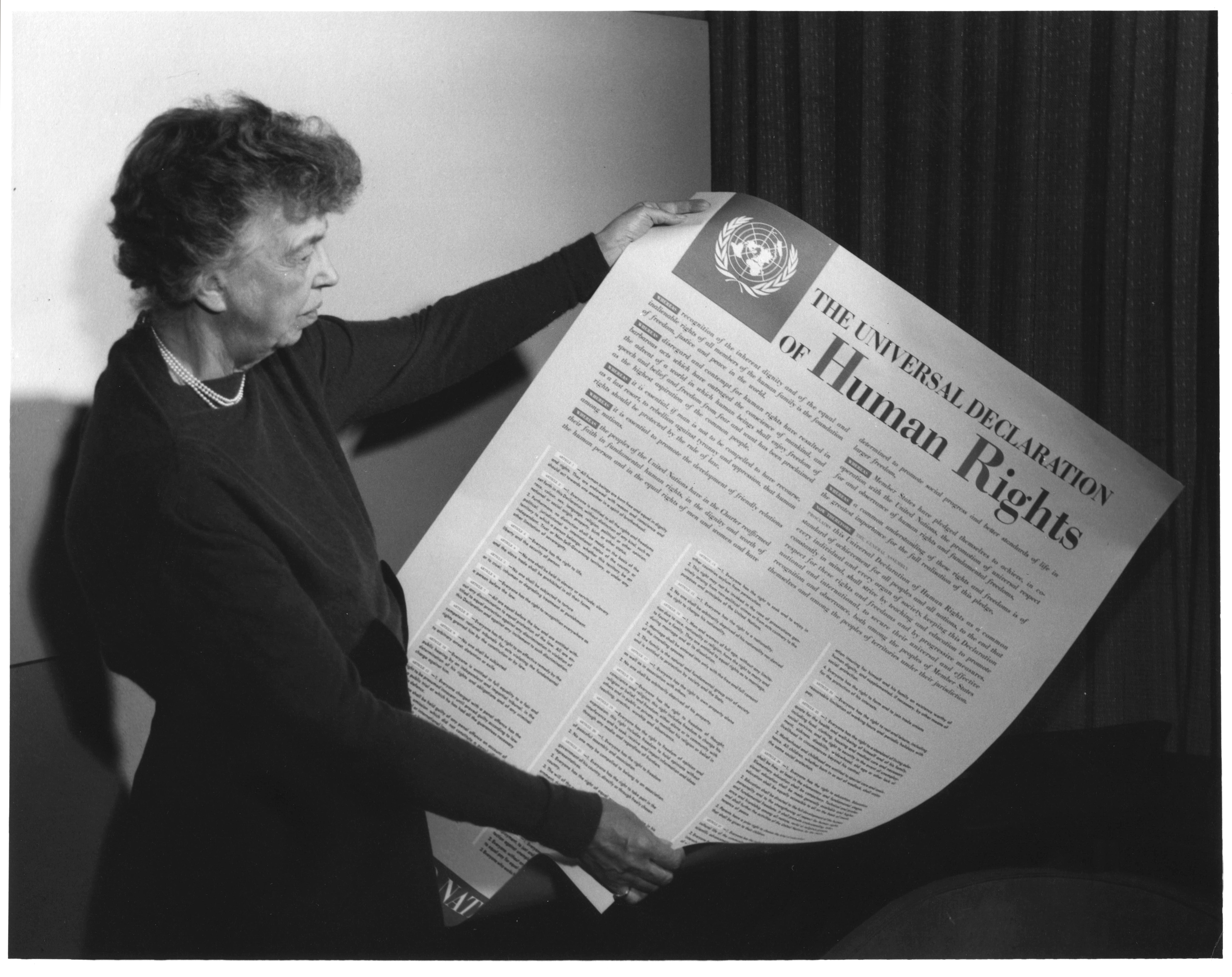
Eleanor Roosevelt and the Universal Declaration of Human Rights (1948)

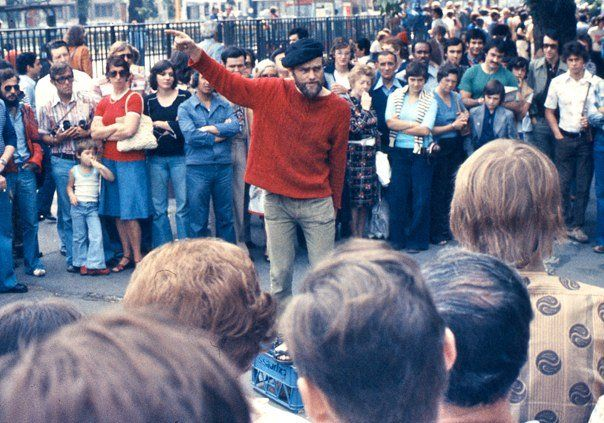
Orator at London's Speakers' Corner, 1974

Freedom of speech is a principle that supports the freedom of an individual or a community to articulate their opinions and ideas without fear of retaliation, censorship, or legal sanction. The right to freedom of expression has been recognised as a human right in the Universal Declaration of Human Rights (UDHR) and international human rights law. Many countries have constitutional laws that protect freedom of speech. Terms such as free speech, freedom of speech, and freedom of expression are often used interchangeably in political discourse. However, in legal contexts, freedom of expression more broadly encompasses the right to seek, receive, and impart information or ideas, regardless of the medium used.

Article 19 of the UDHR states that "everyone shall have the right to hold opinions without interference" and "everyone shall have the right to freedom of expression; this right shall include freedom to seek, receive, and impart information and ideas of all kinds, regardless of frontiers, either orally, in writing or print, in the form of art, or through any other media of his choice". The version of Article 19 in the ICCPR later amends this by stating that the exercise of these rights carries "special duties and responsibilities" and may "therefore be subject to certain restrictions" when necessary "[f]or respect of the rights or reputation of others" or "[f]or the protection of national security or public order (ordre public), or of public health or morals".

Therefore, freedom of speech and expression may not be recognized as absolute. Common limitations or boundaries to freedom of speech relate to libel, slander, obscenity, pornography, sedition, incitement, fighting words, hate speech, classified information, copyright violation, trade secrets, food labeling, non-disclosure agreements, the right to privacy, dignity, the right to be forgotten, public security, blasphemy and perjury. Justifications for such include the harm principle, proposed by John Stuart Mill in On Liberty, which suggests that "the only purpose for which power can be rightfully exercised over any member of a civilized community, against his will, is to prevent harm to others".

The "offense principle" is also used to justify speech limitations, describing the restriction on forms of expression deemed offensive to society, considering factors such as extent, duration, motives of the speaker, and ease with which it could be avoided.

With the evolution of the digital age, new means of communication emerged. However, these means are also subject to new restrictions. Countries or organizations may use internet censorship to block undesirable or illegal material. Social media platforms frequently use content moderation to filter or remove user-generated content that is deemed against the terms of service, even if that content is legal.

== Historical origins ==
Freedom of speech and expression has a long history that predates modern international human rights instruments. It is thought that the ancient Athenian democratic principle of free speech may have emerged in the late 6th or early 5th century BC.

Freedom of speech was vindicated by Erasmus and Milton. Edward Coke claimed freedom of speech as "an ancient custom of Parliament" in the 1590s, affirmed in the Protestation of 1621. Restating what is written in the English Declaration of Right, 1689, England's Bill of Rights 1689 legally established the constitutional right of freedom of speech in Parliament, which is still in effect. This so-called parliamentary privilege includes no possible defamation claims, meaning Parliamentarians are free to speak up in the House without fear of legal action. This protection extends to written proceedings: for example, written and oral questions, motions and amendments tabled to bills and motions. Taking refuge in England in 1726, Voltaire wrote about his admiration for the tolerance and freedom of speech in England in his Letters on the English (1733), which he strived to introduce into his native France.

One of the world's first freedom of the press acts was introduced in Sweden in 1766 (Swedish Freedom of the Press Act), mainly due to the classical liberal member of parliament and Ostrobothnian priest Anders Chydenius. In a report published in 1776, he wrote:

No evidence should be needed that a certain freedom of writing and printing is one of the strongest bulwarks of a free organization of the state, as, without it, the estates would not have sufficient information for the drafting of good laws, and those dispensing justice would not be monitored, nor would the subjects know the requirements of the law, the limits of the rights of government, and their responsibilities. Education and ethical conduct would be crushed; coarseness in thought, speech, and manners would prevail, and dimness would darken the entire sky of our freedom in a few years.

Under the leadership of Anders Chydenius, the Caps at the Swedish Riksdag in Gävle on December 2, 1766, passed the adoption of a freedom of the press regulation that stopped censorship and introduced the principle of public access to official records in Sweden. Excluded were defamation of the king's majesty and the Swedish Church.

The Declaration of the Rights of Man and of the Citizen, adopted during the French Revolution in 1789, expressly affirmed freedom of speech as an inalienable right. Adopted in 1791, freedom of speech is a feature of the First Amendment to the United States Constitution. The French Declaration provides for freedom of expression in Article 11, which states that:

The free communication of ideas and opinions is one of the most precious of the rights of man. Every citizen may, accordingly, speak, write, and print with freedom, but shall be responsible for such abuses of this freedom as shall be defined by law.

Article 19 of the Universal Declaration of Human Rights, adopted in 1948, states that:

Everyone has the right to freedom of opinion and expression; this right includes freedom to hold opinions without interference and to seek, receive and impart information and ideas through any media and regardless of frontiers.

Today, freedom of speech, or the freedom of expression, is recognised in international and regional human rights law. The right is enshrined in Article 19 of the International Covenant on Civil and Political Rights, Article 10 of the European Convention on Human Rights, Article 13 of the American Convention on Human Rights and Article 9 of the African Charter on Human and Peoples' Rights. Based on John Milton's arguments, freedom of speech is understood as a multi-faceted right that includes not only the right to express, or disseminate, information and ideas but three further distinct aspects:

1. the right to seek information and ideas;
2. the right to receive information and ideas;
3. the right to impart information and ideas

International, regional and national standards also recognise that freedom of speech, as the freedom of expression, includes any medium, whether orally, in writing, in print, through the internet or art forms. This means that the protection of freedom of speech as a right includes the content and the means of expression.

=== History of dissent and truth ===
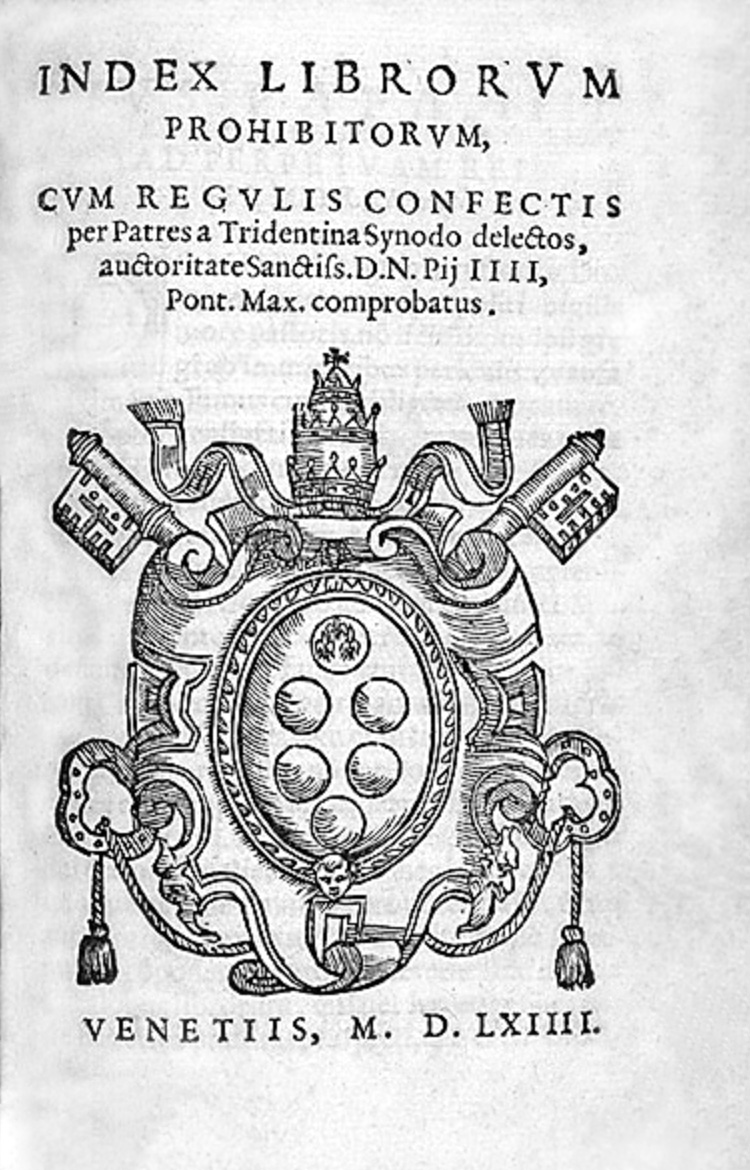
Title page of Index Librorum Prohibitorum, or List of Prohibited Books (Venice, 1564)

Before the invention of the printing press, a written work, once created, could only be physically multiplied by highly laborious and error-prone manual copying. No elaborate censorship system and control over scribes existed, who until the 14th century were restricted to religious institutions, and their works rarely caused wider controversy. In response to the printing press, and the theological heresies it allowed to spread, the Roman Catholic Church moved to impose censorship. Printing allowed for multiple exact copies of a work, leading to a more rapid and widespread circulation of ideas and information (see print culture). The origins of copyright law in most European countries lie in efforts by the Roman Catholic Church and governments to regulate and control the output of printers.

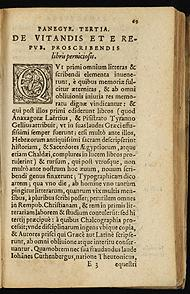
In Panegyricae orationes septem (1596), Henric van Cuyck, a Dutch Bishop, defended the need for censorship and argued that Johannes Gutenberg's printing press had resulted in a world infected by "pernicious lies"—so van Cuyck singled out the Talmud and the Qur'an, and the writings of Martin Luther, Jean Calvin and Erasmus of Rotterdam.

In 1501, Pope Alexander VI issued a Bill against the unlicensed printing of books. In 1559, Pope Paul IV promulgated the Index Expurgatorius, or List of Prohibited Books. The Index Expurgatorius is the most famous and long-lasting example of "bad books" catalogues issued by the Roman Catholic Church, which presumed to be in authority over private thoughts and opinions, and suppressed views that went against its doctrines. The Index Expurgatorius was administered by the Roman Inquisition, but enforced by local government authorities, and went through 300 editions. Amongst others, it banned or censored books written by René Descartes, Giordano Bruno, Galileo Galilei, David Hume, John Locke, Daniel Defoe, Jean-Jacques Rousseau and Voltaire. While governments and church encouraged printing in many ways because it allowed for the dissemination of Bibles and government information, works of dissent and criticism could also circulate rapidly. Consequently, governments established controls over printers across Europe, requiring them to have official licenses to trade and produce books.

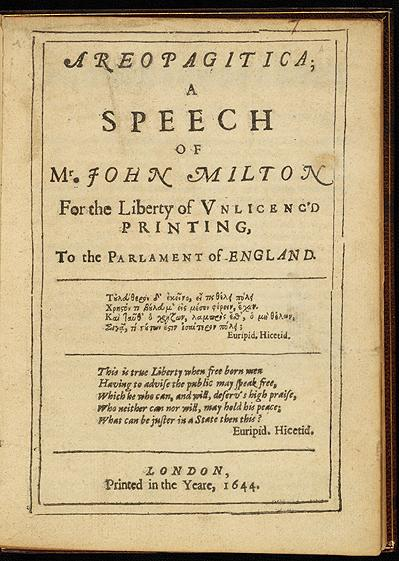
First page of John Milton's 1644 edition of Areopagitica, in which he argued forcefully against the Licensing Order of 1643

The notion that the expression of dissent or subversive views should be tolerated, not censured or punished by law, developed alongside the rise of printing and the press. Areopagitica, published in 1644, was John Milton's response to the Parliament of England's re-introduction of government licensing of printers, hence publishers. Church authorities had previously ensured that Milton's essay on the right to divorce was refused a license for publication. In Areopagitica, published without a license, Milton made an impassioned plea for freedom of expression and toleration of falsehood, stating:

Give me the liberty to know, to utter, and to argue freely according to conscience, above all liberties.

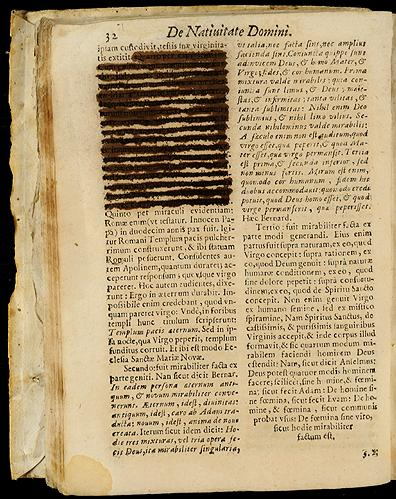
This 1688 edition of Jacobus de Voragine's Golden Legend (1260) was censored according to the Index Librorum Expurgatorum of 1707, which listed the specific passages of books already in circulation that required censorship.

Milton's defense of freedom of expression was grounded in a Protestant worldview. He thought that the English people had the mission to work out the truth of the Reformation, which would lead to the enlightenment of all people. Nevertheless, Milton also articulated the main strands of future discussions about freedom of expression. By defining the scope of freedom of expression and "harmful" speech, Milton argued against the principle of pre-censorship and favored tolerance for a wide range of views. The English press ceased being regulated in 1695 when the Licensing Order of 1643 was allowed to expire, following the Glorious Revolution and the introduction of the Bill of Rights 1689. The emergence of publications like the Tatler (1709) and the Spectator (1711) are credited for creating a "bourgeois public sphere" in England that allowed for a free exchange of ideas and information.

More governments attempted to centralize control as the "menace" of printing spread. The French crown repressed printing and the printer Etienne Dolet was burned at the stake in 1546. In 1557 the British Crown thought to stem the flow of seditious and heretical books by chartering the Stationers' Company. The right to print was limited to the members of that guild. Thirty years later, the Star Chamber was chartered to curtail the "greate enormities and abuses" of "dyvers contentyous and disorderlye persons professinge the arte or mystere of pryntinge or selling of books". The right to print was restricted to two universities and the 21 existing printers in the city of London, which had 53 printing presses. As the British crown took control of type founding in 1637, printers fled to the Netherlands. Confrontation with authority made printers radical and rebellious, with 800 authors, printers, and book dealers being incarcerated in the Bastille in Paris before it was stormed in 1789.

A succession of English thinkers was at the forefront of early discussion on a right to freedom of expression, among them John Milton (1608–74) and John Locke (1632–1704). Locke established the individual as the unit of value and the bearer of rights to life, liberty, property and the pursuit of happiness. However, Locke's ideas evolved primarily around the concept of the right to seek salvation for one's soul. He was thus primarily concerned with theological matters. Locke neither supported a universal toleration of people nor freedom of speech; according to his ideas, some groups, such as atheists, should not be allowed.

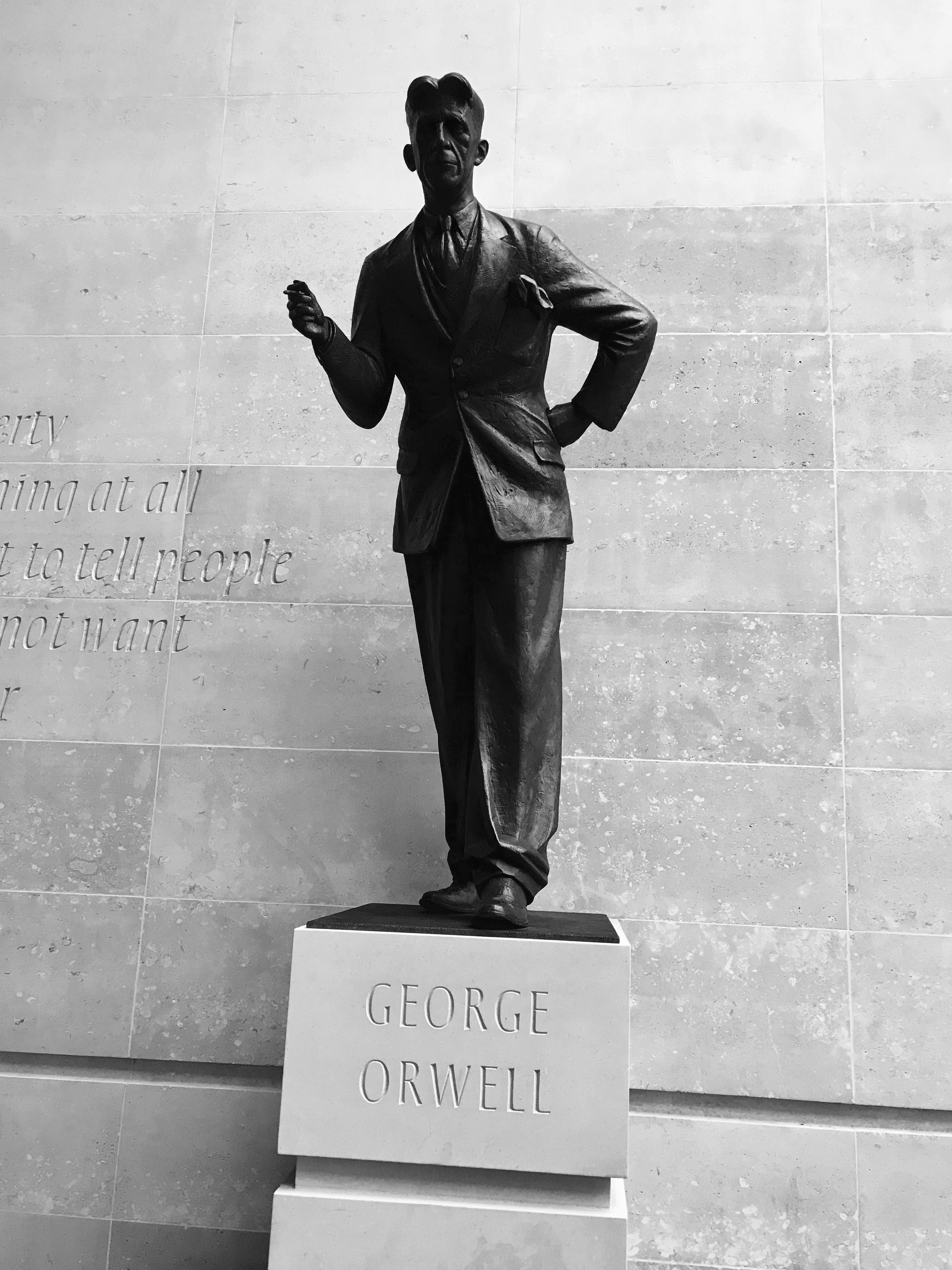
George Orwell statue at the headquarters of the BBC. A defence of free speech in an open society, the wall behind the statue is inscribed with the words "If liberty means anything at all, it means the right to tell people what they do not want to hear", words from George Orwell's proposed preface to Animal Farm (1945).

By the second half of the 17th century philosophers on the European continent like Baruch Spinoza and Pierre Bayle developed ideas encompassing a more universal aspect freedom of speech and toleration than the early English philosophers. By the 18th century the idea of freedom of speech was being discussed by thinkers all over the Western world, especially by French philosophes like Denis Diderot, Baron d'Holbach and Claude Adrien Helvétius. The idea began to be incorporated in political theory both in theory as well as practice; the first state edict in history proclaiming complete freedom of speech was the one issued 4 December 1770 in Denmark-Norway during the regency of Johann Friedrich Struensee. However Struensee himself imposed some minor limitations to this edict on 7 October 1771, and it was even further limited after the fall of Struensee with legislation introduced in 1773, although censorship was not reintroduced.

John Stuart Mill (1806–1873) argued that without human freedom, there could be no progress in science, law, or politics, which, according to Mill, required free discussion of opinion. Mill's On Liberty, published in 1859, became a classic defence of the right to freedom of expression. Mill argued that truth drives out falsity, therefore the free expression of ideas, true or false, should not be feared. Truth is not stable or fixed but evolves with time. Mill argued that much of what we once considered true is false. Therefore, views should not be prohibited for their apparent falsity. Mill also argued that free discussion is necessary to prevent the "deep slumber of a decided opinion". Discussion would drive the march of truth, and the basis of actual views could be reaffirmed by considering false views. Furthermore, Mill argued that an opinion only carries intrinsic value to the owner of that opinion, thus silencing the expression of that opinion is an injustice to a basic human right. It is generally held that for Mill, the only instance in which speech can be justifiably suppressed is to prevent harm from a clear and direct threat. Neither economic or moral implications nor the speaker's well-being would justify suppression of speech. However Mill in On Liberty suggests the speech of pimps — instigating clients and sex workers to have sex — should be restricted. This suggests he may be willing to curtail some speech undermining their decisional autonomy while not harming others.

In her 1906 biography of Voltaire, Evelyn Beatrice Hall coined the following sentence to illustrate Voltaire's beliefs: "I disapprove of what you say, but I will defend to the death your right to say it". Hall's quote is frequently cited to describe the principle of freedom of speech. Noam Chomsky stated, "If you believe in freedom of speech, you believe in freedom of speech for views you don't like. Dictators such as Stalin and Hitler, were in favor of freedom of speech for views they liked only. If you're in favor of freedom of speech, that means you're in favor of freedom of speech precisely for views you despise". Lee Bollinger argues that "the free speech principle involves a special act of carving out one area of social interaction for extraordinary self-restraint, the purpose of which is to develop and demonstrate a social capacity to control feelings evoked by a host of social encounters". Bollinger argues that tolerance is a desirable value, if not essential. However, critics argue that society should be concerned by those who directly deny or advocate, for example, genocide (see limitations above).

As chairman of the London-based PEN International, a club which defends freedom of expression and a free press, English author H. G. Wells met with Stalin in 1934 and was hopeful of reform in the Soviet Union. However, during their meeting in Moscow, Wells said, "the free expression of opinion—even of opposition opinion, I do not know if you are prepared yet for that much freedom here".

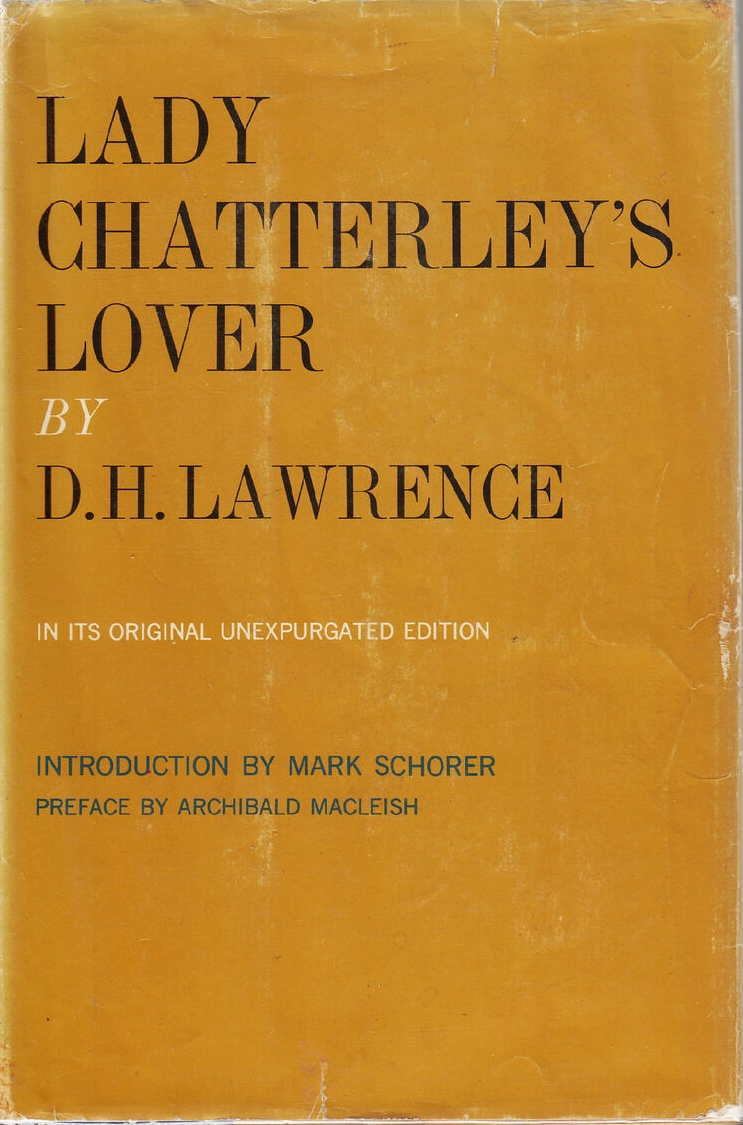
An "unexpurgated" edition of Lady Chatterley's Lover (1959)

The 1928 novel Lady Chatterley's Lover by D. H. Lawrence was banned for obscenity in several countries, including the United Kingdom, the United States, Australia, Canada, and India. In the late 1950s and early 1960s, it was the subject of landmark court rulings that saw the ban on obscenity overturned. Dominic Sandbrook of The Telegraph in the UK wrote, "Now that public obscenity has become commonplace, it is hard to recapture the atmosphere of a society that saw fit to ban books such as Lady Chatterley's Lover because it was likely to 'deprave and corrupt' its readers". Fred Kaplan of The New York Times stated the overturning of the obscenity laws "set off an explosion of free speech" in the U.S. The 1960s also saw the Free Speech Movement, a massive, long-lasting student protest on the campus of the University of California, Berkeley, during the 1964–65 academic year.

In contrast to Anglophone nations, France was a haven for literary freedom. The innate French regard for the mind meant that France was disinclined to punish literary figures for their writing, and prosecutions were rare. While it was prohibited everywhere else, James Joyce's Ulysses was published in Paris in 1922. Henry Miller's 1934 novel Tropic of Cancer (banned in the U.S. until 1963) and Lawrence's Lady Chatterley's Lover were published in France decades before they were available in the respective authors' home countries.

In 1964, comedian Lenny Bruce was arrested in the U.S. due to complaints again about his use of various obscenities. A three-judge panel presided over his widely publicized six-month trial. He was found guilty of obscenity in November 1964. He was sentenced on 21 December 1964, to four months in a workhouse. He was set free on bail during the appeals process and died before the appeal was decided. On 23 December 2003, thirty-seven years after Bruce's death, New York Governor George Pataki granted him a posthumous pardon for his obscenity conviction.

In some Asian countries, such as India, the right to freedom of speech and expression is not absolute. While Article 19 of India’s constitution guarantees the right "to freedom of speech and expression," the constitution also allows the government to limit free speech and free expression in cases of national security and public order, among others.

== Relationship to other rights ==
The right to freedom of speech and expression is closely related to other rights. It may be limited when conflicting with other rights (see limitations on freedom of speech). The right to freedom of expression is also related to the right to a fair trial and court proceedings, which may limit access to the search for information, or determine the opportunity and means in which freedom of expression is manifested within court proceedings. As a general principle freedom of expression may not limit the right to privacy, as well as the honor and reputation of others. However, greater latitude is given when criticism of public figures is involved.

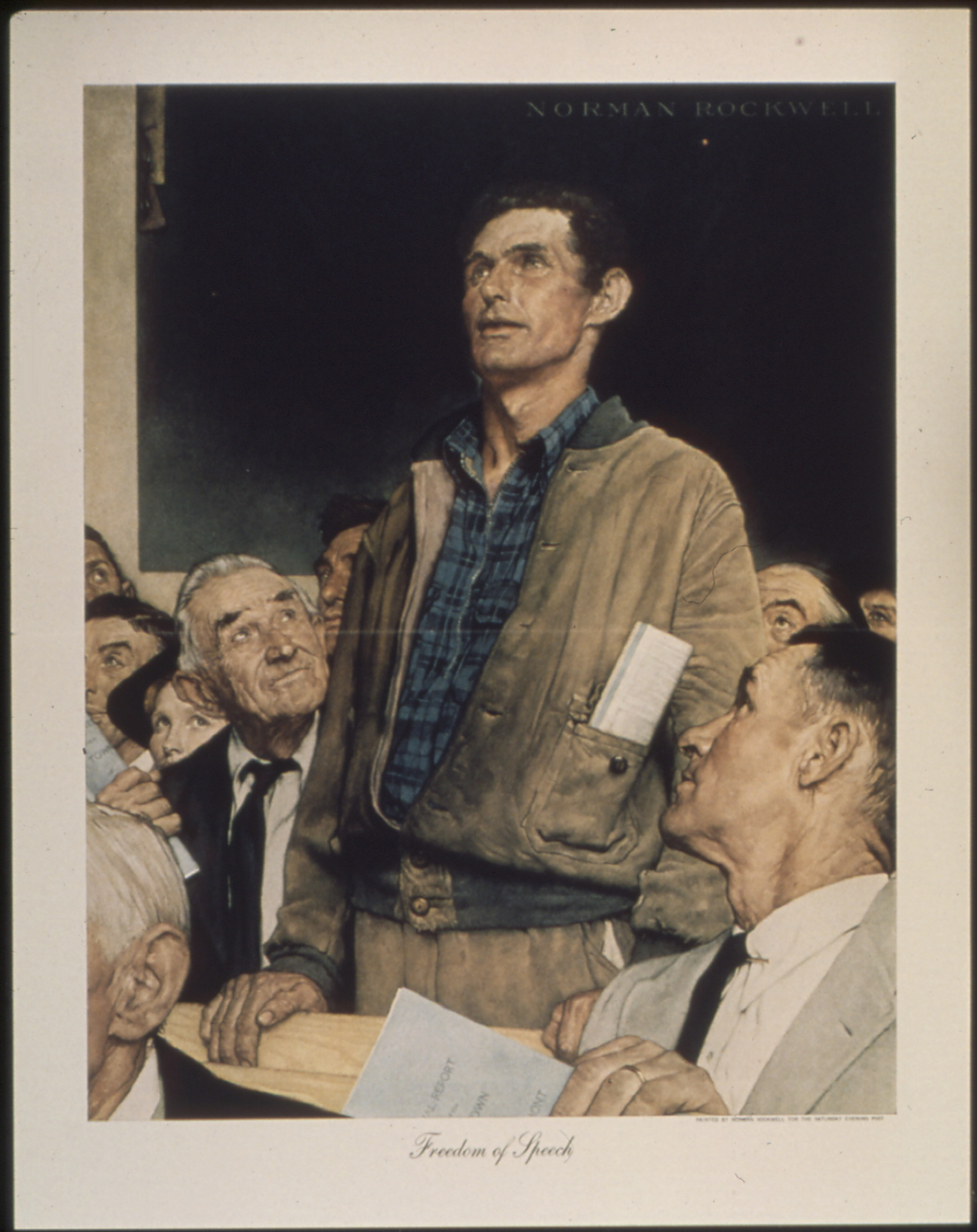
Freedom of Speech from the Four Freedoms series by Norman Rockwell

The right to freedom of expression is particularly important for media, which play a special role as the bearer of the general right to freedom of expression for all. However, freedom of the press does not necessarily enable freedom of speech. Judith Lichtenberg has outlined conditions where freedom of the press may constrain freedom of speech. For example, if all the people who control the various media of publication suppress information or stifle the diversity of voices inherent in freedom of speech. This limitation was famously summarised as "Freedom of the press is guaranteed only to those who own one". Lichtenberg argues that freedom of the press is simply a form of property right summed up by the principle "no money, no voice".

=== As a negative right ===
Freedom of speech is usually seen as a negative right. This means that the government is legally obliged to take no action against the speaker based on the speaker's views, but that no one is obliged to help any speakers publish their views, and no one is required to listen to, agree with, or acknowledge the speaker or the speaker's views. These concepts correspond to earlier traditions of natural law and common law rights.

=== Democracy in relation to social interaction ===
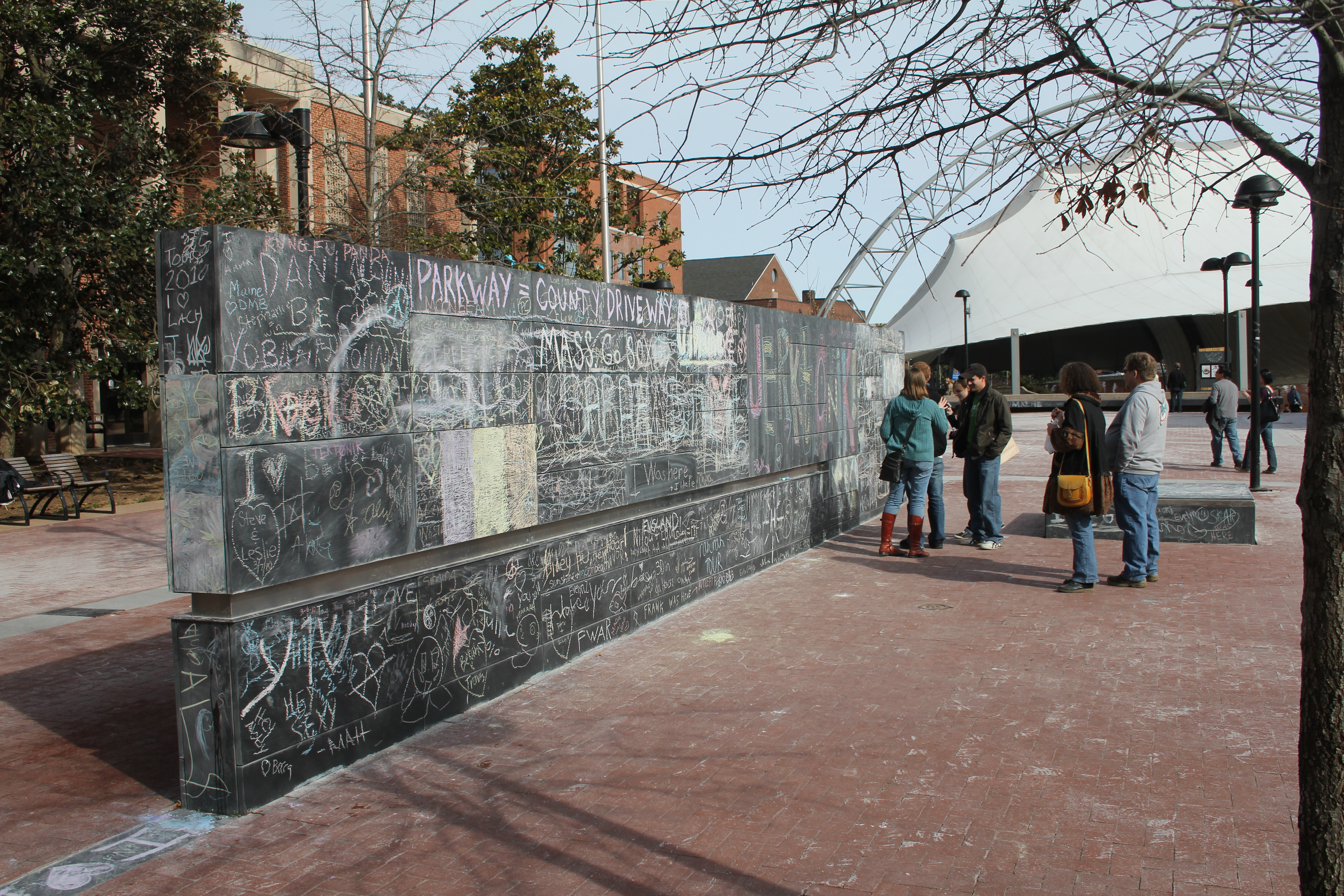
Permanent Free Speech Wall in Charlottesville, Virginia, U.S.

Freedom of speech is understood to be fundamental in a democracy. The norms on limiting freedom of expression mean that public debate may not be completely suppressed even in times of emergency. One of the most notable proponents of the link between freedom of speech and democracy is Alexander Meiklejohn. He has argued that the concept of democracy is self-government by the people. For such a system to work, an informed electorate is necessary. To be appropriately knowledgeable, there must be no constraints on the free flow of information and ideas. According to Meiklejohn, democracy will not be true to its essential ideal if those in power can manipulate the electorate by withholding information and stifling criticism. Meiklejohn acknowledges that the desire to manipulate opinion can stem from seeking to benefit society. However, he argues, choosing manipulation negates, in its means, the democratic ideal.

Eric Barendt has called this defence of free speech on the grounds of democracy "probably the most attractive and certainly the most fashionable free speech theory in modern Western democracies". Thomas I. Emerson expanded on this defence when he argued that freedom of speech helps to provide a balance between stability and change. Freedom of speech acts as a "safety valve" to let off steam when people might otherwise be bent on revolution. He argues that "The principle of open discussion is a method of achieving a more adaptable and at the same time more stable community, of maintaining the precarious balance between healthy cleavage and necessary consensus". Emerson furthermore maintains that "Opposition serves a vital social function in offsetting or ameliorating (the) normal process of bureaucratic decay".

Research undertaken by the Worldwide Governance Indicators project at the World Bank indicates that freedom of speech and the process of accountability that follows it have a significant impact on the quality of governance of a country. "Voice and Accountability" within a country, defined as "the extent to which a country's citizens are able to participate in selecting their government, as well as freedom of expression, freedom of association, and free media" is one of the six dimensions of governance that the Worldwide Governance Indicators measure for more than 200 countries. Against this backdrop it is important that development agencies create grounds for effective support for a free press in developing countries.

Richard Moon has argued that the value of freedom of speech and expression lies in social interactions. Moon writes, "Communicating an individual forms relationships and associations with others – family, friends, co-workers, church congregation, and countrymen. By entering into discussion with others an individual participates in the development of knowledge and in the direction of the community".

The Human Rights Measurement Initiative measures the right to opinion and expression for countries around the world, using a survey of in-country human rights experts.

=== Political speech ===
In the U.S., the standing landmark opinion on political speech is Brandenburg v. Ohio (1969), expressly overruling Whitney v. California. In Brandenburg, the U.S. Supreme Court referred to the right even to speak openly of violent action and revolution in broad terms:

[Our] decisions have fashioned the principle that the constitutional guarantees of free speech and free press do not allow a State to forbid or proscribe advocacy of the use of force or law violation except where such advocacy is directed to inciting or producing imminent lawless action and is likely to incite or cause such action.

The opinion in Brandenburg discarded the previous test of "clear and present danger" and made the right to freedom of (political) speech protections in the United States almost absolute.

=== Freedom of information ===
Freedom of information is an extension of freedom of speech where the medium of expression is the Internet. Freedom of information may also refer to the right to privacy in the context of the Internet and information technology. As with the right to freedom of expression, the right to privacy is a recognised human right and freedom of information acts as an extension to this right. Freedom of information may also concern censorship in an information technology context, i.e., the ability to access Web content, without censorship or restrictions.

Freedom of information can also be explicitly protected by acts. For example, in Canada, provinces have acts suchas the Freedom of Information and Protection of Privacy Act of Ontario or Freedom of Information and Protection of Privacy Act of Alberta. The country-wide Access to Information Act gives Canadian citizens, permanent residents, and any person or corporation present in Canada a right to access records of government institutions that are subject to the Act.

=== Freedom of religion ===
Freedom of religion or religious liberty, also known as freedom of religion or belief (FoRB), is a principle that supports the freedom of an individual or community, in public or private, to manifest religion or belief in teaching, practice, worship, and observance. It also includes the right not to profess any religion or belief or not to practice a religion, often called freedom from religion.

== Limitations ==
Some do not regard freedom of speech as absolute. Most legal systems generally set limits on it, particularly when it conflicts with other rights and protections, such as in cases of libel, slander, pornography, obscenity, fighting words, and intellectual property. Public support for limiting freedom of speech varies by form and time. Some limitations to freedom of speech may occur through legal sanction, and others may occur through social disapprobation.

=== Time, place, and manner ===
Limitations based on time, place, and manner apply to all speech, regardless of the view expressed. They are generally restrictions that are intended to balance other rights or a legitimate government interest. For example, a time, place, and manner restriction might prohibit a noisy political demonstration at a politician's home during the middle of the night, as that impinges upon the rights of the politician's neighbors to quiet enjoyment of their own homes. An otherwise identical activity might be permitted if it happened at a different time (e.g., during the day), at a different place (e.g., at a government building or in another public forum), or in a different manner (e.g., a silent protest). Funeral protests are a complex issue in the United States. It is a right for Americans to hold a peaceful protest against various policies they deem unreasonable. It is a question of whether or not it is appropriate to protest funeral proceedings through the time, place, and manner outlook. Because of recent flare-ups, legislation has been implemented to limit this. Now, funeral protests are governed and prohibited by law on a state-to-state basis inside the United States.

==== On the Internet ====
The Free Speech Flag was created during the AACS encryption key controversy as "a symbol to show support for personal freedoms".

Jo Glanville, editor of the Index on Censorship, states that "the Internet has been a revolution for censorship as much as for free speech". International, national and regional standards recognise that freedom of speech, as one form of freedom of expression, applies to any medium, including the Internet. The Communications Decency Act (CDA) of 1996 was the first major attempt by the United States Congress to regulate pornographic material on the Internet. In 1997, in the landmark cyberlaw case of Reno v. ACLU, the US Supreme Court partially overturned the law. Judge Stewart R. Dalzell, one of the three federal judges who in June 1996 declared parts of the CDA unconstitutional, in his opinion stated the following:

The Internet is a far more speech-enhancing medium than print, the village green, or the mails. Because it would necessarily affect the Internet itself, the CDA would necessarily reduce the speech available for adults on the medium. This is a constitutionally intolerable result. Some of the dialogue on the Internet surely tests the limits of conventional discourse. Speech on the Internet can be unfiltered, unpolished, and unconventional, even emotionally charged, sexually explicit, and vulgar – in a word, "indecent" in many communities. But we should expect such speech to occur in a medium in which citizens from all walks of life have a voice. We should also protect the autonomy that such a medium confers to ordinary people as well as media magnates.[...] My analysis does not deprive the Government of all means of protecting children from the dangers of Internet communication. The Government can continue to protect children from pornography on the Internet through vigorous enforcement of existing laws criminalising obscenity and child pornography. [...] As we learned at the hearing, there is also a compelling need for public educations about the benefits and dangers of this new medium, and the Government can fill that role as well. In my view, our action today should only mean that Government's permissible supervision of Internet contents stops at the traditional line of unprotected speech. [...] The absence of governmental regulation of Internet content has unquestionably produced a kind of chaos, but as one of the plaintiff's experts put it with such resonance at the hearing: "What achieved success was the very chaos that the Internet is. The strength of the Internet is chaos." Just as the strength of the Internet is chaos, so that strength of our liberty depends upon the chaos and cacophony of the unfettered speech the First Amendment protects.

The World Summit on the Information Society (WSIS) Declaration of Principles adopted in 2003 makes specific reference to the importance of the right to freedom of expression for the "Information Society" in stating:

We reaffirm, as an essential foundation of the Information society, and as outlined in Article 19 of the Universal Declaration of Human Rights, that everyone has the right to freedom of opinion and expression; that this right includes freedom to hold opinions without interference and to seek, receive and impart information and ideas through any media and regardless of frontiers. Communication is a fundamental social process, a basic human need and the foundation of all social organisation. It is central to the Information Society. Everyone, everywhere should have the opportunity to participate and no one should be excluded from the benefits of the Information Society offers.

According to Bernt Hugenholtz and Lucie Guibault, the public domain is under pressure from the "commodification of information" as information with previously little or no economic value has acquired independent economic value in the information age. This includes factual data, personal data, genetic information and pure ideas. The commodification of information is taking place through intellectual property law, contract law, as well as broadcasting and telecommunications law.

Freedom of information has emerged in response to state-sponsored censorship, monitoring, and internet surveillance. Internet censorship includes the control or suppression of the publishing or accessing of information on the Internet. The Global Internet Freedom Consortium claims to remove blocks to the "free flow of information" for what they term "closed societies". According to the Reporters without Borders (RWB) "internet enemy list" the following states engage in pervasive internet censorship: Mainland China, Cuba, Iran, Myanmar/Burma, North Korea, Saudi Arabia, Syria, Turkmenistan, Uzbekistan, and Vietnam.

A widely publicized example of internet censorship is the "Great Firewall of China" (in reference both to its role as a network firewall and the ancient Great Wall of China). The system blocks content by preventing IP addresses from being routed through and consists of standard firewall and proxy servers at the internet gateways. The system also selectively engages in DNS poisoning when particular sites are requested. The government does not appear to be systematically examining Internet content, as this appears to be technically impractical. Internet censorship in the People's Republic of China is conducted under a wide variety of laws and administrative regulations, including more than sixty regulations directed at the Internet. Censorship systems are vigorously implemented by provincial branches of state-owned ISPs, business companies, and organizations.

Saudi Arabia's government had been intensifying the scrutiny of social media accounts, under which they were detaining several activists, critics, and even normal social media users over a few critical tweets. A law professor, Awad Al-Qarni, became a victim of Saudi Arabia's internet censorship and was facing a death sentence. Saudi-controlled media portrayed him as a dangerous preacher due to his Twitter and WhatsApp posts, but dissidents considered him an important intellectual who maintained strong social media influence.

=== Content viewed as harmful and offensive ===
World map highlighting countries with legislation criminalising Holocaust denial as of 2025 Countries where Holocaust denial is illegal Countries where Holocaust denial is illegal when threatening or inciting hatred, discrimination, or violence, or where legality is ambiguous

Some views are illegal to express because some perceive them to be harmful to others. This category often includes speech that is both false and potentially dangerous, such as falsely shouting "Fire!" in a theatre and causing a panic. Justifications for limitations to freedom of speech often reference the "harm principle" or the "offence principle".

In On Liberty (1859), John Stuart Mill argued that "...there ought to exist the fullest liberty of professing and discussing, as a matter of ethical conviction, any doctrine, however immoral it may be considered". Mill argues that the fullest liberty of expression is required to push arguments to their logical limits, rather than the limits of social embarrassment.

In 1985, Joel Feinberg introduced what is known as the "offence principle". Feinberg wrote, "It is always a good reason in support of a proposed criminal prohibition that it would probably be an effective way of preventing serious offence (as opposed to injury or harm) to persons other than the actor, and that it is probably a necessary means to that end". Hence Feinberg argues that the harm principle sets the bar too high and that some forms of expression can be legitimately prohibited by law because they are very offensive. Nevertheless, as offending someone is less serious than harming someone, the penalties should be higher for causing harm. In contrast, Mill does not support legal penalties unless they are based on the harm principle. Because the degree to which people may take offence varies, or may be the result of unjustified prejudice, Feinberg suggests that several factors need to be taken into account when applying the offence principle, including: the extent, duration and social value of the speech, the ease with which it can be avoided, the motives of the speaker, the number of people offended, the intensity of the offence, and the general interest of the community at large.

Jasper Doomen argued that harm should be defined from the point of view of the individual citizen, not limiting harm to physical harm since nonphysical harm may also be involved; Feinberg's distinction between harm and offence is criticized as essentially trivial.

In 1999, Bernard Harcourt wrote of the collapse of the harm principle: "Today the debate is characterized by a cacophony of competing harm arguments without any way to resolve them. There is no longer an argument within the structure of the debate to resolve the competing claims of harm. The original harm principle was never equipped to determine the relative importance of harms".

Interpretations of the limitations of harm and offense to freedom of speech are culturally and politically relative. For instance, in Russia, the harm and offense principles have been used to justify the Russian LGBT propaganda law restricting speech (and action) concerning LGBT issues. Many European countries outlaw speech that might be interpreted as Holocaust denial. These include Austria, Belgium, Canada, the Czech Republic, France, Germany, Hungary, Israel, Liechtenstein, Lithuania, Luxembourg, the Netherlands, Poland, Portugal, Russia, Slovakia, Switzerland and Romania. Armenian genocide denial is also illegal in some countries.

Hate speech is protected by the First Amendment in the United States, as decided in R.A.V. v. City of St. Paul, (1992) in which the Supreme Court ruled that hate speech is permissible, except in the case of imminent violence. The First Amendment to the United States Constitution contains more detailed information on the Supreme Court decision and its historical background.

Certain public institutions may also enact policies restricting the freedom of speech, for example, speech codes at state-operated schools. On the censorship of critical perspectives of U.S. history in American schools, a study in 2024 found that "in 16 Republican-dominated states, policies have been enacted to restrict the teaching of critical perspectives on race, sexuality, and other controversial subjects and to perpetuate a positive view of U.S. history". Legislatures in 40 states introduced over 200 bills that would restrict curricula, with some laws penalizing history teachers for speaking about certain "divisive concepts", such as race and oppression.

Political differences and in-group favoritism on harmful speech and content moderation were found. Judges can show political bias when evaluating freedom of speech.

==== Religious ====
Blasphemy laws and penalties by jurisdiction: Death sentences Prison sentences Fines, other restrictions, or unknown penalty Blasphemy is a common law offence Blasphemy laws repealed No blasphemy laws

Restriction of apostasy by country (2020)

Apostasy has been instrumentalized to restrict freedom of speech in some countries. In some countries, blasphemy is a crime. For example, in Austria, defaming Muhammad, the prophet of Islam, is not protected as free speech. In contrast, in France, blasphemy and disparagement of Muhammad are protected under free speech law.

==== Lèse-majesté ====
A map of countries which have lèse-majesté laws as of January 2023

In some countries, speech deemed insulting to a reigning monarch or the state, including lèse-majesté, is criminalized. Such expression may constitute a criminal offence.

In Saudi Arabia, journalists are forbidden to write with disrespect or disapproval of the royal family, religion, or the government. Journalists are also not legally protected for their writing in Saudi Arabia. Journalist Jamal Khashoggi was a critic of the Saudi Arabian government. Saudi Arabian officials killed Khashoggi in 2018 for his writing.

==== Disinformation ====
Some legal scholars (such as Tim Wu of Columbia University) have argued that the traditional issues of free speech—that "the main threat to free speech" is the censorship of "suppressive states", and that "ill-informed or malevolent speech" can and should be overcome by "more and better speech" rather than censorship—assumes scarcity of information. This scarcity prevailed during the 20th century, but with the arrival of the internet, information became plentiful, "but the attention of listeners" scarce. Furthermore, in the words of Wu, this "cheap speech" made possible by the internet " ... may be used to attack, harass, and silence as much as it is used to illuminate or debate". The Electronic Frontier Foundation (EFF) has argued that "censorship cannot be the only answer to disinformation online" and that tech companies "have a history of overcorrecting and censoring accurate, useful speech—or, even worse, reinforcing misinformation with their policies."

According to Wu, in the 21st century, the danger is not "suppressive states" that target "speakers directly", but that:

...targets listeners or it undermines speakers indirectly. More precisely, emerging techniques of speech control depend on (1) a range of new punishments, like unleashing "troll armies" to abuse the press and other critics, and (2) "flooding" tactics (sometimes called "reverse censorship") that distort or drown out disfavored speech through the creation and dissemination of fake news, the payment of fake commentators, and the deployment of propaganda robots. As journalist Peter Pomerantsev writes, these techniques employ "information ... in weaponized terms, as a tool to confuse, blackmail, demoralize, subvert and paralyze."

On 4 March 2022, Russian President Vladimir Putin signed into law a bill introducing prison sentences of up to 15 years for spreading "fake news" about Russia's military operation in Ukraine. As of December 2022, more than 4,000 Russians were prosecuted under "fake news" laws. The 1993 Russian Constitution expressly prohibits censorship in Article 29 of Chapter 2, Rights and Liberties of Man and Citizen.

== See also ==
- Academic freedom
- Artistic freedom
- Bans on communist symbols
- Bans on Nazi symbols
- Censorship of LGBTQ issues
- Civic engagement
- Civil and political rights
- Digital rights
- Everybody Draw Mohammed Day
- Free speech fights
- Freedom of religion
- Freedom of thought
- Glasnost
- Internet censorship
- Jyllands-Posten Muhammad cartoons controversy
- Marketplace of ideas
- Mediacracy
- Media democracy
- Media transparency
- No Platform
- Paradox of tolerance
- Photography Is Not a Crime
- Pirate Party
- Political correctness
- Right to proselytize
- Safety of journalists
- Stanley v. Georgia
- Symbolic speech
- Victimless crime
- Volksverhetzung limitations in Germany and other countries
