= Thomas Jefferson Medal =

Thomas Jefferson Medal may refer to several different awards named in honor of Thomas Jefferson:

- Thomas Jefferson Medal for Distinguished Achievement in the Arts, Humanities, and Social Sciences, given by the American Philosophical Society
- Thomas Jefferson Medal for Outstanding Contributions to Natural Science, given by the Virginia Museum of Natural History Foundation
- Thomas Jefferson Star for Foreign Service, an award of the United States Department of State
- The University of Virginia and Thomas Jefferson Foundation have jointly granted Jefferson Foundation medals:
  - Thomas Jefferson Foundation Medal in Architecture, given jointly by the Thomas Jefferson Foundation and the University of Virginia School of Architecture
  - Thomas Jefferson Foundation Medal in Law, given jointly by the Thomas Jefferson Foundation and the University of Virginia School of Law
  - Thomas Jefferson Foundation Medal in Citizen Leadership, given jointly by the Thomas Jefferson Foundation and the University of Virginia
  - Thomas Jefferson Foundation Medal in Global Innovation
- Jefferson Awards for Public Service are given by the American Institute for Public Service
