= C. A. Patrides =

Greek–American academic and writer (1930–1986)

Constantinos Apostolos Patrides (1930 – 23 September 1986) was a Greek-American academic and writer, and "one of the greatest scholars of Renaissance literature of his generation". His books list the name C. A. Patrides; his Christian name "Constantinos" was shortened to the familiar "Dinos" and "Dean" by friends.

Born in New York City, he lived in Greece during World War II. His childhood service with the Greek Resistance against the Axis Occupation earned him a medal for heroism from the Greek Orthodox Patriarch of Jerusalem. At Kenyon College and at Oxford University, he began the research that was published as Milton and the Christian Tradition, a classic study of John Milton's Christian theology. Patrides was a professor at the University of California and the University of York and a distinguished professor at the University of Michigan. He was a prolific writer on literature and intellectual history and lectured around the world. He edited study editions of the prose of Milton and of the poems of John Donne and George Herbert. After his 1986 death, his works and alms and all his good endeavors were commemorated by the annual Patrides lectures at York and by both the Patrides Fellowships and the Patrides Professorship at Michigan.

== Early life ==
A U.S. citizen with Greek parents, Patrides was born in New York City in 1930 and raised there. With his parents, he was in Greece during World War II. While still a boy, he carried messages for the Greek resistance against the German occupation and thereby earned the Order of Unknown Heroes medal from the Greek Orthodox Patriarch of Jerusalem. The resistance was led by the Greek Communist Party, which he viewed as a danger to the freedom of post-War Greece; later he identified himself as "a firm anti-Communist". His anti-Communism was Christian and humanistic, the same traditions which nourished his criticisms of the Renaissance and the Twentieth Century:

The liberty of the individual, threatened in Milton's time as in ours by a society militantly bent on conformity, was further defended by Milton in his several expressly political works. ... The fundamental principle of Milton's thought is lucidly stated: 'No man who knows ought, can be so stupid as to deny that all men naturally are born free'.

— The Tenure of Kings and Magistrates, (Patrides 1985, p. 255)

He remained a faithful member of the Greek Orthodox Church; in later years, he would come to forgive his students of the 1960s and 1970s for "their ignorance, their radical politics, and their atheism."

He studied with John Crowe Ransom and Charles M. Coffin at the English Department of Kenyon College in Gambier, Ohio. Years later, Patrides dedicated his Lycidas: The Tradition and the Poem to the (Christian) religious memory of Ransom. At Kenyon, under the supervision of James Holly Hanford, he wrote his senior thesis on Milton's place in the Christian tradition, beginning the central research project of his next fifteen years. Graduating in 1952, he served in the U.S. Army between 1952 and 1954, earning decorations for his service.

He earned a D.Phil. from Oxford University in 1957 under the supervision of Ethel Seaton, continuing his work on Milton and the history of Christianity. On the day of his thesis defence, Patrides posted 35 packages, each of which submitted an article to a scholarly journal.

== Academic positions ==
After Oxford, Patrides taught at the University of California, Berkeley, where he rose through the ranks as instructor, assistant professor, and then associate professor. In 1960, he received a Guggenheim Fellowship to study English Literature. His 1963 absence left no teacher for the graduate course on John Milton's literature, until a young Middle English specialist, Stanley Fish, volunteered to cover Patrides's course. Fish's experience teaching the course was the start of his reader-response study of Milton, Surprised by Sin.

In 1964, Patrides moved to the new University of York in England where he was a founder member of the English Department and appointed "Professor of English and Related Literature". In 1978, he moved to the University of Michigan in Ann Arbor, becoming in 1981 the G. B. Harrison Distinguished Professor of English.

== Achievements ==
Patrides wrote or edited 23 books and more than 100 other scholarly publications. His publications, Roland Frye said, were "a monument to the highest and most enduring standards of our profession. ... In our time, certainly, no one has excelled his breadth and depth of learning, shaped throughout by superb critical judgment"". George Bornstein, a scholar of 19th and 20th-century poetry, noted in 1986 that "Patrides produced numerous pioneering books and articles which remain standard texts."

=== Literary analysis and explication ===
His knowledge of languages and literatures enabled him to locate literary works in their historical contexts. In particular, Patrides clarified Milton's theology and its relation to Trinitarian and Arian Christologies, doing "more than the combined efforts of all the rest of us to clarify and settle that issue with full regard to its theological complexities and to the subtleties of the poetic expression", wrote Frye. Of his contemporaries, he was the best at explaining and analyzing philosophical and historical issues, according to Summers and Pebworth.

=== Lectures ===
Invited to speak at universities around the world, Patrides gave lectures that were informative and elegant. For the Milton Society of America, he gave the annual address in 1974 and was named the Honored Scholar of 1978. At the University of Michigan, Patrides received the Distinguished Faculty Achievement Award in 1982.

=== Editing of critical editions ===
Patrides wrote informative introductions and annotations as part of his preparation of critical editions of literary works. His edition of the English prose of Milton discussed Milton's literary leadership in the English Reformation and Civil War. In this work, Patrides noted appreciations and misappropriations of Milton by later writers, particularly Romantics, who neglected the Christian discipline of Milton's thought and practice. Patrides prepared two Everyman editions of the collected poems of Donne and Herbert, two leading Metaphysical poets. Both prefaces noted his aim "to avoid the impertinence of mere paraphrases" while providing essential contextual information to aid the contemporary reader. Despite his prodigious knowledge of literature and of religious history, Patrides eschewed elaborate annotations that would distract readers from the text itself. Restrained annotation allowed readers to experience the semantic harmonics of Metaphysical poetry and of Milton, the most allusive writer of the English Renaissance. For additional explanation, readers should consult first the Oxford English Dictionary and second his selected bibliography. Patrides's editing and his commentaries were called reverential by Frye. In the judgment of Summers and Pebworth, "Patrides's Olympian style remains distinctive, characterized not only by its mannered elegance of phrasing, but preeminently by a kind of sophisticated wit that incorporates playfulness and amusement even in the most serious of observations and that prevents even the most magisterial pronouncements from ever sounding pompous or self-important."

== Death and legacy ==
On 23 September 1986, C. A. Patrides, called "Dean" and "Dinos" by his friends, died at the age of 56. Memorial services were held at the University of Michigan, Dearborn and the University of Michigan, Ann Arbor. At the next meeting of the Milton Society of America, 170 colleagues attended the eulogy by Roland Frye. The Society's Milton Quarterly published the eulogy of Frye (1987) and personal memorials by two friends, Professors Summers (1987) and Campbell (1987).

The University of Michigan established the C. A. Patrides graduate fellowship, with an award made in 1987, and established the C. A. Patrides Professorship of English in 1995. From 2005–2006, the C. A. Patrides Collegiate Professor of English was George Bornstein, a specialist in modernism. The University of York hosts an annual Patrides Lecture. Patrides's former student, Gordon Campbell of the University of Leicester, was appointed the editor of the fourth Everyman edition of the selected works of John Milton at the suggestion of Patrides. Campbell dedicated his edition to Patrides's memory.

== Selected works ==
- Lycidas: The Tradition and the Poem (Holt, Rinehart, 1961) LCCN 61005930
- The Phoenix and the Ladder: The Rise and Decline of the Christian View of History (Berkeley, 1964) LCCN 64064250
- Milton and the Christian Tradition (Oxford, 1966) ISBN 0-208-01821-2
- Milton's Epic Poetry: Essays on "Paradise Lost" and "Paradise Regained" (Harmondsworth, 1967) LCCN 68072604
- Approaches to Paradise Lost: The York Tercentenary Lectures (University of Toronto, 1968) ISBN 0-8020-1577-8
- The Cambridge Platonists, London, 1969, (Cambridge, 1980) ISBN 0-521-29942-X
- Bright Essence: Studies in Milton's Theology (University of Utah, 1971) ISBN 0-8357-4382-9
- The Grand Design of God: The Literary Form of the Christian View of History (Toronto, 1972) ISBN 0-7100-7401-8
- Selected Prose by John Milton, Baltimore, 1974, (University of Missouri, 1985) ISBN 0-8262-0484-8
- The English Poems of George Herbert (J.M. Dent, 1974) ISBN 0-87471-551-2
- The Major Works of Sir Thomas Browne (Penguin, 1977) ISBN 0-14-043109-8
- The Age of Milton: Backgrounds to Seventeenth-century Literature (Manchester University, 1980) ISBN 0-7190-0770-4
- Premises and Motifs in Renaissance Thought and Literature (Princeton, 1982) ISBN 0-691-06505-5
- Milton's Lycidas: The Tradition and the Poem (revised edition, University of Missouri, 1983) ISBN 0-8262-0412-0
- The Complete English Poems of John Donne (J.M. Dent, 1985) ISBN 0-460-10091-2
- Figures in a Renaissance Context (University of Michigan, 1989) ISBN 0-472-10119-6
- George Herbert: The Critical Heritage (Psychology Press, 1996) ISBN 0-415-13413-7

== See also ==
- Angels, hierarchy of
- Apocatastasis
- Cambridge Platonists
- John Milton and Christianity
  - Arianism
  - Disestablishmentarianism
  - Non-trinitarianism
  - Of Reformation
- Novus homo
