= Glbtq: An encyclopedia of gay, lesbian, bisexual, transgender, and queer culture =

Encyclopedia of gay, lesbian, bisexual, transgender and queer culture

glbtq Encyclopedia Project
- Website type: Encyclopedia
- Available in: English
- Founded: March 2003
- Dissolved: August 1, 2015
- Founder: Andrew Wikholm
- Editors: Claude Summers, Ted-Larry Pebworth, Linda Rapp
- Website: glbtq.com (defunct); glbtqarchive.com (archive)
- Registration: Optional
- Current status: Defunct
- OCLC number: 1069404371

glbtq.com (also known as the glbtq Encyclopedia Project) was an online encyclopedia of gay, lesbian, bisexual, transgender, and queer (GLBTQ) culture. Launched in 2003, it was edited by Claude J. Summers, emeritus professor at the University of Michigan–Dearborn, and published by Andrew "Wik" Wikholm. It was warmly received by critics, who praised its columns as well-researched. The encyclopedia closed in 2015; its content is accessible via an online archive.

== History ==
The website was launched in 2003 with over 1 million words of entries, and was regularly updated until its closure in 2015. Before its closure, the encyclopedia contained more than 2.2 million words—including overviews and surveys—covering almost 2,000 entries. The entries are categorized into three departments: Arts, Literature, and History and Social Sciences. The site also included a discussion board, interviews, factoids on queer history and spotlights on selected articles.

All entries in the encyclopedia had bylines and references. Its editor was Claude J. Summers, emeritus professor at the University of Michigan–Dearborn. Andrew "Wik" Wikholm was the founder and publisher. Over the projects life, more than two hundred people contributed to the encyclopedia, including Shaun Cole (curator at London's Victoria and Albert Museum) and Edward Sullivan (professor of fine arts at New York University). Other contributors include Tee Corinne (photographer and visual artist), William Hood (professor of art at Oberlin College), Karla Jay (director of Women's Studies at Pace University), Stephen O. Murray (writer), and Jim Provenzano (writer).

A decline in advertising revenue led the website to shut down on August 1, 2015. Its contents were archived by ONE, Inc., and are accessible at glbtqarchive.com.

== Reception ==
The encyclopedia was well received by reviewers. Library Journal found it well-researched and described its columns as "lively and succinct". Writing that the contributor's backgrounds were impressive, Choice Reviews called the website "phenomenal" and praised the "great, nearly faultless, text", but bemoaned the lack of illustrations. In an otherwise positive review, Reference Reviews felt that the website's advertising was intrusive; Choice disagreed, finding it innocuous. The website was termed the "Encyclopedia Britanniqueer" by The Advocate, and one of the "Best Free Reference Web Sites" by the American Library Association.

== Publications ==
In association with Cleis Press, glbtq.com produced three books:

- Summers, Claude J. (2004). The Queer Encyclopedia of the Visual Arts. Cleis Press. ISBN 1-57344-191-0.
- Summers, Claude J. (2004). The Queer Encyclopedia of Music, Dance, & Musical Theater. Cleis Press. ISBN 1-57344-198-8.
- Summers, Claude J. (2005). The Queer Encyclopedia of Film & Television. Cleis Press. ISBN 1-57344-209-7.
