= Religious views of John Milton =

Aspect of author's life

The religious views of John Milton influenced many of his works focusing on the nature of religion and of the divine. He differed in important ways from the Calvinism with which he is associated, particularly concerning the doctrines of grace and predestination. The unusual nature of his own Protestant Christianity has been characterized as both Puritan and Independent.

== Theological political writings ==
=== Church government ===
After the start of the Bishops' Wars, a movement was started calling for the disestablishment of the Church of England and the religious hierarchy. Milton joined in on a pamphlet war that soon followed and produced his antiprelatical tracts. These pamphlets emphasize the need for an individual to be exposed to scripture without any interference from a church government or from a fixed liturgy that could possibly corrupt the individual.

=== Divorce laws ===
Milton married in the spring of 1642 but his wife soon left him. The legal statutes of England did not allow for Milton to apply for a divorce and he began examining the legitimacy of divorce. Milton was motivated towards writing on the topic after reading a work of Martin Bucer that emphasized the scriptural legitimacy of divorce. After publishing his divorce pamphlets, especially after Doctrine and Discipline of Divorce, Milton developed a reputation as both a divorcer and a polygamist. Eventually, Milton believed that a translation of Bucer's work, published as Judgement of Martin Bucer Concerning Divorce, would convince Parliament of the truth behind his previous tract on divorce, but this did not happen. He continued to pursue the topic until his wife returned to him and their marriage was reconciled.

=== Paradise Lost ===
Paradise Lost is Milton's epic depiction of the Fall of Man. In the story, Adam and Eve are warned against the evils of Satan and are told of the war in Heaven in which Satan challenged God's throne and was cast down in punishment. Satan, in order to get revenge against God, tempts Eve into eating of the forbidden fruit of the Tree of Knowledge of Good and Evil, and Adam, out of love, joins with her in the disobedience so she will not be blamed alone. God punishes them by casting them out of Eden and exposing them to the pain of the world, but he promises them that his Son will descend and bring about their salvation.

=== Paradise Regained ===
Paradise Regained follows Paradise Lost; also an epic, it retells the Temptation of Christ. Much shorter than its predecessor, It places the Son, incarnated as Christ, against Satan who tries to tempt Christ and to discover who he is, but he is unable to before he finally gives up and Christ defeats him.

=== Samson Agonistes ===
Milton's last work, Samson Agonistes is a closet drama based on the format of Greek tragedy, and describes the Biblical story of Samson. When Samson is betrayed and blinded, he calls upon God to use him one more time to effect his will and exact revenge upon God's enemies.

== Religious views ==
=== On the soul ===
Milton believed in the idea of soul sleeping or mortalism, which determines that the soul, upon death, is in a sleeplike state until the Last Judgment. Similarly, he believed that Christ, when incarnated, merged his divine and human identities, and that both of these identities died during his Crucifixion. With such views on the nature of the human body and the soul, there is no possibility of a state of existence between death and the resurrection, and concepts such as Purgatory are outright denied. However, these views are not standard Calvinistic interpretations, but his views on what happens after the resurrection are orthodox Calvinistic doctrine: Christ, during the resurrection, would raise man up higher than the state he was in before the fall.

=== Religious toleration ===
John Milton called in the Areopagitica for "the liberty to know, to utter, and to argue freely according to conscience, above all liberties". "Milton argued for disestablishment as the only effective way of achieving broad toleration. Rather than force a man's conscience, government should recognize the persuasive force of the gospel."
