= De Doctrina Christiana (Milton) =

Theological treatise possibly by John Milton

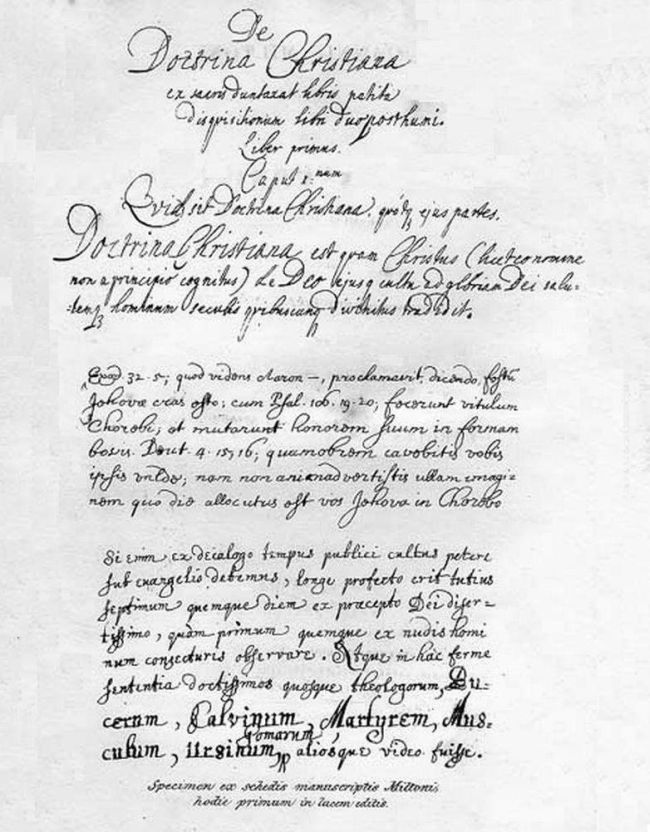
Title page of De Doctrina Christiana

De Doctrina Christiana (transl. 'On Christian Doctrine') is a theological treatise commonly attributed to the English poet and thinker John Milton (1608–1674), containing a systematic exposition of his religious views. The Latin manuscript "De Doctrina" was found in 1823 and published in 1825. The authorship of the work is debatable. In favor of the theory of the non-authenticity of the text, comments are made both over its content (it contradicts the ideas of his other works, primarily the poems Paradise Lost and Paradise Regained), and it is difficult to imagine that such a complex text could be written by a blind person (Milton was blind by the time of the work's creation, thus it is now assumed that an amanuensis aided the author). However, after nearly a century of interdisciplinary research, it is generally accepted that the manuscript belongs (at least in part) to Milton. The course of work on the manuscript, its fate after the death of the author, and the reasons for which it was not published during his lifetime are well established. The most common nowadays point of view on De Doctrina Christiana is to consider it as a theological commentary on poems.

The history and style of Christian Doctrine have created much controversy. Critics have argued about the authority of the text as representative of Milton's philosophy based on possible problems with its authorship, its production, and over what its content actually means. As Lieb has shown "... I do not think we shall ever know conclusively whether or not Milton authored all of the De Doctrina Christiana, part of it, or none of it."

The work has been translated into English three times: by Charles R. Sumner in 1825, by John Carey in 1973, and by John K. Hale and J. Donald Cullington in 2012.

== Background ==
The only manuscript of Christian Doctrine was found during 1823 in London's Old State Paper Office (at the Middle Treasury Gallery in Whitehall). The work was one of many in a bundle of state papers written by John Milton while he served as Secretary of Foreign Tongues under Oliver Cromwell. The manuscript was provided with a prefatory epistle that explains the background and history to the formation of the work. If it is genuine, the manuscript is the same work referred to in Milton's Commonplace Book and in an account by Edward Phillips, Milton's nephew, of a theological "tractate".

Because Milton was blind, the manuscript of De Doctrina Christiana was the work of two people: Daniel Skinner and Jeremie Picard. Picard first copied the manuscript from previous works and Skinner prepared the work to be copied for typesetting, although there are a few unidentified editors who made changes to the manuscript. After Milton died in 1674, Daniel Skinner was given Christian Doctrine along with Milton's other manuscripts. In 1675, Skinner attempted to publish the work in Amsterdam, but it was rejected, and in 1677 he was pressured by the English government to hand over the document upon which it was then hidden.

There have been three published English translations of De Doctrina Christiana. The first, commissioned by the Crown, was an 1825 translation by Charles R. Sumner, titled A Treatise on Christian Doctrine Compiled from the Holy Scriptures Alone. The original Latin text was not included (it was published in a separate volume), but it was added on the facing page when the Sumner translation was reprinted in Volumes 14-17 of Columbia's The Works of John Milton in 1933-4. Thomas Macaulay assesses this translation:

His version is not indeed very easy or elegant; but it is entitled to the praise of clearness and fidelity. His notes abound with interesting quotations, and have the rare merit of really elucidating the text. The preface is evidently the work of a sensible and candid man, firm in his own religious opinions, and tolerant towards those of others.

— Thomas Babington Macaulay, Essay on Milton

The second translation, by John Carey in 1973, was not in a dual language format and was printed in Volume 6 of Yale's Complete Prose Works of John Milton. The third and latest translation, a collaborative work between John K. Hale and J. Donald Cullington published in 2012 as Volume 8 of Oxford's The Complete Works of John Milton, works from a new transcription of the original manuscript, and publishes the Latin and English translation in a facing-page format. All three of these translations identify Milton as the author.

There is a minority line of criticism that denies Christian Doctrine as a work produced by Milton, but these critics have suggested no authors in place of Milton. These denials are grounded in the assumptions that a blind Milton would struggle to rely on so many Biblical quotations and that the Christian Doctrine is the sole reason why Milton is viewed as having a heterodox theological understanding. In response to this argument, many critics have focused on defending Milton's authorship e.g. Lewalski and Fallon. The argument also fails to account for the high Biblical literacy of the time. Currently many scholars support Miltonic authorship of the piece, and most editions of Milton's prose include the work.

== Manuscript ==
The Christian Doctrine is divided into two books. The first book is then divided into 33 chapters and the second into 17.

The first part of the work appears to be "finished" because it is free of edits and the handwriting (Skinner's) is neat, whereas the second is filled with edits, corrections, and notes in the margins. Skinner's incomplete fair copy has stirred controversy over the work, because it does not provide critics with the ability to determine what the fair copy was based on.

The manuscript itself is patterned on the theological treatises common to Milton's time, such as William Ames's Medulla Theologica and John Wolleb's Compendium Theologiae Christianae. Although Milton refers to "forty-two works", of these many were what he called "systematic theologies" in his various works. Christian Doctrine does not allude to them in the same way as Milton's political treatises. However, the actual pattern of discourse found within the treatise is modeled after Ames's and Wolleb's works even if the content is different.

Where Milton differs is in the use of scripture as evidence. Milton relies on scripture as the basis of his argument and keeps scripture in the center of his text, whereas many other theological treatises keep scriptural passages to the margins. In essence, as Lieb says, "Milton privileges the proof-text over that which is to be proven." Schwartz has gone so far as to claim that Milton "ransacked the whole Bible" and that Milton's own words are "squeezed out of his text." However, the actual "proof-texts" of the Bible are various: no single version is used in Milton's Latin citations.

== Theology ==
Milton's approach to theology is to deal directly with the Bible and use "the word of God" as his basis. Even though Milton relied on the pattern of "theological systems" of his day, he believed that there could be "progress" achieved in understanding theology by relying on the Bible completely. Milton "filled" his theology with direct quotations from the Bible in order to separate his work from his contemporaries who did not deal with the Bible enough for his taste. Some critics have argued that Milton's theology is Arian.

=== Christian Doctrine ===
The first chapter of Christian Doctrine discusses the actual meaning of "Christian Doctrine." Milton claims that this "Christian Doctrine" needs to be understood before one can begin to talk about divinity and that the doctrine comes from Christ's communication to mankind about divinity. The doctrine requires humans to "come to terms with God's nature" and it comes from "the ever-abiding desire to celebrate [God's] glory because of his redemptive plan."

Milton's approach to Christian doctrine is not philosophical, and Milton does not attempt at "knowing" God. Instead, we have to find God "in the Holy Scriptures alone and with the Holy Spirit as guide." Milton grounds his message in Christian teaching when he says:

I do not teach anything new in this work. I am only to assist the reader's memory by collecting together as it were, into a single book texts which are scattered here and there throughout the Bible, and by systematizing them under definite headings in order to make reference easy.

As such, Milton promotes the idea that his whole work comes only from the teachings of Christ, and that Christian doctrine can only come from Christ.

=== Milton's God ===
Milton's version of God is characterized by the darker aspects of deus absconditus. Milton's God is an "over-whelming force" that, in some of Milton's works, appears "as the embodiment of dread." Along with this, God is not definable, but some of his aspects are knowable: he is one, omnipresent, and eternal.

Milton's interpretation of God has been described as Arian. Kelley explains the actual usage of this term as he says, "Milton may be quite correctly called an Arian if he holds an anti-Trinitarian view of God; and it is in this sense that scholars have been calling Milton an Arian since the publication of the De Doctrina in 1825." In particular, Christian Doctrine denies the eternity of the Son, Jesus's pre-birth title. Such a denial separates the unity between God and the Son. However, some claim that Milton did believe that the Son is eternal, since he was begotten before time, and that he represents part of the Logos. But this cannot be, as Kelley points out, "Milton concludes, the Son was begotten not from eternity but 'within the limits of time.'" Although some have argued that the Son is equal in some respects with God, the Son lacks the complete attributes of God.

Another aspect of Milton's God is that he is material. This is not to say that he has a human form, as Milton states, "God in his most simple nature is a SPIRIT." However, such "spirits" to Milton, as with many of his contemporaries like Thomas Hobbes, are a type of material. God, from his material essence, is able to establish all other matter and then manipulate that matter to create forms and beings.

== Critical response ==
In the mid 20th century, C. A. Patrides declared Christian Doctrine as a "theological labyrinth" and as "an abortive venture into theology." The style of organisation has been identified as (in large part) Ramist, or at least compatible with the elaborate charting by Ramean trees common in some of the systematic and scholastic Calvinist theologies of the early seventeenth century.

According to Mario Praz, «the central idea of De Doctrina Christiana (published only in 1825) is the progress of the regenerated man from restrictive, external submission under the Mosaic law to a positive, internal, voluntary freedom to serve and guide himself, achieved through faith in the Gospel».
