= Claude J. Summers =

American literary scholar

Claude J. Summers (born 1944) is an American literary scholar, and the William E. Stirton Professor Emeritus in the Humanities and Professor Emeritus of English at the University of Michigan-Dearborn.

== Early life and education ==
A native of Galvez, Louisiana, Claude Summers was the third child of Burg Martin Summers and Theo Coy Causey. He was educated in the public schools of Ascension Parish, graduating from Gonzales High School in 1962. He has long credited two teachers at Gonzales High School—Diana Sevario Welch and Sherry Rushing—for inspiring his interest in academic achievement.

He received his B.A. in 1962 from Louisiana State University, where he majored in English Literature and served as editor of Delta, the undergraduate literary journal. At LSU, he formed a romantic relationship with Ted-Larry Pebworth, with whom he would later collaborate on numerous scholarly articles and books. In 1966, he was awarded a Woodrow Wilson Fellowship, which enabled him to attend graduate school at the University of Chicago.

At Chicago, he earned his A.M. in 1967 and his Ph.D. in 1970. His doctoral work was supported by a Danforth Fellowship and a University of Chicago Dissertation Fellowship. His dissertation, later published as Christopher Marlowe and the Politics of Power (1974), was directed by David Bevington and Arthur Heiserman. It was one of the first books on Marlowe to focus on homosexuality as a major theme in Marlowe's plays without adopting a condemnatory or moralistic tone.

== Career ==
After receiving his Ph.D. from Chicago in 1970, he accepted an assistant professorship at the University of Michigan-Dearborn, where he taught until his retirement in 2002. He was promoted to associate professor in 1973 and to professor in 1977. He became the William E. Stirton Professor in Humanities in 1989, and was named professor emeritus in 2002.

Ted-Larry Pebworth joined Summers at the University of Michigan-Dearborn in 1971, and together they established the Dearborn campus as a center of Renaissance and seventeenth-century English studies, especially through their biennial Renaissance conferences, which from 1974 until 2000 attracted leading scholars in the field. The series yielded thirteen major collections of essays, most edited by Summers and Pebworth.

In addition to their work together organizing the conference series and editing the collections of essays from them, Summers and Pebworth also collaborated on a number of significant essays on such seventeenth-century figures as John Donne and Henry Vaughan, as well as an edition of the poems of Owen Felltham (1973) and a monograph on Ben Jonson (1979; revised 1999).

Summers's individually authored publications early in his career focused on a wide range of Renaissance and seventeenth-century figures, including Christopher Marlowe, William Shakespeare, Robert Herrick, John Donne, George Herbert, Henry Vaughan, and John Milton, among others; but he soon expanded his range of interests to include modern English and American literature, including especially LGBT literature.

A founding member of the Modern Language Association's gay and lesbian caucus, Summers helped lead the gay studies movement to maturity within the academy.

He has published extensively on 17th and 20th century English literature.

Summers's varied work in gay studies includes essays on such figures as W.H. Auden, Gore Vidal, Willa Cather, Mary Renault, Richard Howard, Christopher Marlowe, Richard Barnfield, and William Shakespeare, and on topics relating to Renaissance constructions of homosexuality; books on Christopher Isherwood (1979) and E.M. Forster (1983), a collection of essays on Homosexuality in Renaissance and Enlightenment England: Literary Representations in Historical Context (1992), and his study of the fictional representation of male homosexuals by gay men and lesbians, Gay Fictions: Wilde to Stonewall (1992).

Perhaps his most ambitious work is The Gay and Lesbian Literary Heritage: A Reader's Companion to the Writers and Their Works from Antiquity to the Present (1995; rev. ed., 2002), which provides overviews of the gay and lesbian presence in a variety of literatures and historical periods; in-depth critical essays on gay and lesbian authors in world literature; and coverage of topics and figures important in appreciating the rich and varied gay and lesbian literary traditions.

At the heart of Summers' critical and historical publications—whether on seventeenth-century poetry or on modern gay fiction—is a concern with the intersection of literature and politics, broadly construed. His work evinces a sensitivity to the reciprocal relationship of literature and socio-political issues. That is, he is conscious that literature is influenced by socio-political concerns, and also that it frequently helps shape the political and social issues to which it responds. Summers is always careful not to reduce literature to sociological documents. He places literary works in various sociopolitical contexts, but also helps explicate them as aesthetic creations.

From 2002 until 2015, Summers was general editor of glbtq.com, an online encyclopedia that presented detailed biographies of notable gay, lesbian, bisexual, transgender, and queer people, as well as essays on lgbt history and culture. In that capacity, he also edited three volumes of entries from glbtq.com, which were published by Cleis Press as The Queer Encyclopedia of the Visual Arts, The Queer Encyclopedia of Film and Television, and The Queer Encyclopedia of Music, Dance & Musical Theater.

In 2016, Summers began writing a weekly column for The New Civil Rights Movement blog. Among the topics he has written about have been the jurisprudence of Supreme Court Justice Anthony Kennedy, essayist Joseph Epstein, and America's openly gay ambassadors.

== Honors and awards ==
At the University of Michigan-Dearborn, Summers was honored in a variety of ways. Recognized as a devoted teacher, he received the Distinguished Teaching Award; his scholarship was honored by the Faculty Distinguished Research Award; and he received the Michigan Association of Governing Boards' designation as "A Distinguished Faculty Member."

Summers's other academic honors include the Crompton-Noll Award in Gay Studies; the Distinguished Publication award of the John Donne Society; the recognition of several of his books as "Outstanding Academic Books" by the American Library Association; and the Lambda Literary Award for The Gay and Lesbian Literary Heritage.

In 2008, he received the Monette-Horwitz Trust Award for his efforts in combating homophobia.

== Personal life ==
In 2013, Summers and Pebworth, were married on the fiftieth anniversary of their relationship. On March 1, 2021, Pebworth died in New Orleans, where he and Summers had lived since their retirement from the University of Michigan-Dearborn.

== Selected writings ==
- Summers, Claude J. (1987). "Remarks occasioned by the death of C. A. Patrides". Milton Quarterly. 21 (1): 33–36, 37–39. doi:10.1111/j.1094-348X.1987.tb00706.x.
- Summers, Claude J.; Pebworth, Ted-Larry, eds. (1989), "Introduction", Figures in a Renaissance context, essays by C. A. Patrides, University of Michigan Press, pp. 1–5, ISBN 978-0-472-10119-1
- Summers, Claude, ed. The Gay and Lesbian Literary Heritage. New York: Henry Holt, 1995; rev. ed., Routledge, 2002.
- Summers, Claude. Gay Fictions / Wilde to Stonewall: Studies in a Male Homosexual Literary Tradition. New York: Continuum, 1990.
- Summers, Claude. E.M. Forster. New York: Ungar, 1983.
- Summers, Claude. Christopher Isherwood. New York: Ungar, 1980.
- Summers, Claude, and Ted-Larry Pebworth. Ben Jonson Revised. New York: Twayne, 1999.
- Summers, Claude. "Homophobic Author Fears 'Noted Homophobe' Will Be Carved on His Gravestone." The New Civil Rights Movement (July 17, 2016): http://www.thenewcivilrightsmovement.com/claude_summers/the_sad_case_of_joseph_epstein?recruiter_id=833168
