= Cyriack Skinner =

17th-century English lawyer

Cyriack Skinner (1627–1700) was a friend, pupil and amanuensis (secretary) of the English poet John Milton, and the author of an anonymous biography of the poet.

== Biography ==
Cyriack Skinner was the third son of William Skinner, a Lincolnshire squire who died in 1627. His mother was Bridget Coke, daughter of the famous jurist Sir Edward Coke. Skinner was admitted to Lincoln's Inn on 31 July 1647 and became a lawyer by profession. He came to live near Milton in 1654 and probably began to help the poet at that time. After the Rump Parliament had been reconstituted in 1659 following the death of Oliver Cromwell, Skinner joined the Rota Club. This group met each night at the Turk's Head Coffee House to debate proposals by Milton's opponent, the republican James Harrington, and was often chaired by Skinner. Skinner would have kept Milton informed of the progress of these discussions. He remained close to Milton during the difficult period that followed the Restoration of the Monarchy in 1660 and was present at Milton's deathbed in 1674.

Cyriack Skinner has been identified as the author of the anonymously published book The Life of Mr. John Milton, an important source of first-hand information on the poet. Milton's later assistant Daniel Skinner may have been his relative, notable for first attempting to publish some of Milton's state papers, then attempting to suppress them.

== Sonnets ==
Two of Milton's Sonnets are addressed to Skinner:

=== Sonnet XVIII ===
Cyriack, whose Grandsire on the Royal Bench
Of British Themis, with no mean applause
Pronounc't and in his volumes taught our Lawes,
Which others at their Barr so often wrench:
To day deep thoughts resolve with me to drench
In mirth, that after no repenting drawes;
Let Euclid rest and Archimedes pause,
And what the Swede intend, and what the French.
To measure life, learn thou betimes, and know
Toward solid good what leads the nearest way;
For other things mild Heav'n a time ordains,
And disapproves that care, though wise in show,
That with superfluous burden loads the day,
And when God sends a cheerful hour, refrains.

=== Sonnet XXII ===
Cyriack, this three years' day these eyes, though clear
To outward view of blemish or of spot,
Bereft of light, their seeing have forgot;
Nor to their idle orbs doth sight appear
Of sun or moon or star throughout the year,
Or man or woman. Yet I argue not
Against Heav'n's hand or will, not bate a jot
Of heart or hope, but still bear up and steer
Right onward. What supports me, dost thou ask?
The conscience, friend, to have lost them overplied
In liberty's defence, my noble task,
Of which all Europe talks from side to side.
This thought might lead me through the world's vain mask
Content, though blind, had I no better guide.
