= Daniel Skinner =

Amanuensis of John Milton

Daniel Skinner was an amanuensis of John Milton. He is best known for his role in the posthumous attempts to publish, and then for trying to suppress, several of Milton's State Papers, including De Doctrina Christiana.

== Biography ==
Skinner is presumed to have been a relative of Cyriack Skinner. Biographer Henry John Todd believed him to be probably Cyriack's nephew. He was educated at Westminster School until 1670, and was a Fellow of Trinity College, Cambridge. The college's register records him as 2 October 1674. Daniel Skinner juratus et admissus in socium minorem. and as May 23d, 1679. Daniel Skinner juratus et admissis in socium majorem. These dates, the normal date of admission for major Fellows being July not May and the normal interval between minor and major Fellowship being a year and a half, indicate the extraordinary circumstances that surround Skinner's Fellowship at Trinity.

Skinner attempted to arrange for the posthumous printing and publication, outside England, of some of Milton's state papers, which were at the time unlikely to be publishable in England. In 1675, via Symon Heere, who is presumed to be a Dutch boat skipper, he contacted a printer in Amsterdam, Daniel Elzevir of the House of Elzevir, and attempted to have Elzevir publish Milton's Letters. However, Elzevir was reluctant to do so, and (as he later reported in a letter, dated 1676–11–20, to Sir Joseph Williamson, then Secretary of State) after he had received the manuscripts contacted Skinner in Cambridge to tell him that he was unwilling to publish them, given their contents. Elzevir had sent the manuscripts on for review by Philipp van Limborch, at the time a professor at Remonstrant College.

In the meantime, Skinner was approaching Samuel Pepys, whose resident mistress was Mary Skinner, Daniel's sister, about the possibility of patronage. He wrote an ornate and lengthy letter in Latin, which has since been lost, to Pepys on 1676–07–05, in which he noted that after four years he had still not been fully elected Fellow of Trinity.

Elzevir reported to Williamson that Skinner came to Amsterdam to retrieve the manuscripts from Elzevir, and told Elzevir that he was glad that Elzevir had not published anything, and that he would have bought up and destroyed all copies if Elzevir had. Skinner afterwards stayed out of England, with the manuscripts, but was subjected to official reprimand and recall. Isaac Barrow, Master of Trinity College, wrote to Skinner, ordering him:

To repair immediately to the College; no further allowance to discontinue being granted to you: this you are to doe upon penalty of the Statute, which is expulsion from the College if you disobey. We do also warn you, that if you shall publish any writing mischeivous [sic] to the Church or State, you will thence incurre a forfeiture of your interest here. I hope God will give you the wisdom and grace to take warning.

— Isaac Barrow, Life and Writings of John Milton, Henry John Todd, pp. 297

Skinner followed the order, and in 1679 obtained his major Fellowship. In a letter to Williamson, W. Perwich, the government agent who had conveyed Barrow's instruction to Skinner, who at the time was in Paris, records Skinner's reaction to the order thus:

I have (delivered) Dr. Barrow's letter to Mr. Skinner, before witnesse, as you desired. I found him much surprised, and yet at the same time slighting any constraining orders from the Superior of his Colledge, or any benefit he expected hence, but as to Milton's Workes he intended to have printed, (though he saith that part which he had in M.S.S. are no wat to be objected ag^{t}, either with regard to Royalty and Government) he hath desisted from the causing them to be printed, having left them in Holland, and that he intends, notwithstanding the College summons, to goe for Italy this summer.

— W. Perwich, Letter to Wm. Bridgman, secretary to the Right Honourable Mr Secretary Williamson, 1677-03-15.

Skinner's supplication for his M.A. and subscription to the Three Articles was done via proxy. His supplicat, in the University Archives, is dated 1677–01–30. At that time, Skinner was still in Paris, and the supplicat itself is signed by the Proctor on his behalf.

Skinner's return to Trinity College in 1679 follows the calling of his religious beliefs into question. Although the signing of a supplicat implied (at the time) that one intended to be a Protestant; because Skinner's was signed by the Proctor, possibly not with Skinner's authorisation, it is not necessarily the case that Skinner intended to be one. The Master and Senior Fellows of the college, in March of that year, had issued a further order to Skinner, that he "come home to the College to clear himself of suspicion of being a papist". What is unusual about this request is that such suspicion usually arose from a person's unwillingness to sign the oath of supremacy, a necessary part of the M.A. degree that in turn was a requirement for Major Fellowship of the college. However, by that point, Skinner had already received his M.A. (almost two years earlier, in 1677). Whatever the difficulty may actually have been, for which documentary evidence does not survive, it was overcome. (Campbell advances the hypothesis that Skinner was elected by Royal Mandate, under the patronage of Williamson, against the opposition of the College Seniors.)

After becoming a Major Fellow, Skinner once gain left Cambridge. On 1679-06-04 "Mr Daniel Skinner a protestant" was issued with a passport. He is identified with the "young mister Skinner", discussed in a 1680-07-08 letter by Pepys, who was resident in Barbados and Mevis in 1680–1681. William Howe, Pepys' correspondent, replied on 1681-06-15 telling Pepys that he had attempted to place Skinner in the employment of Edwin Stede of the Royal Africa Company upon Skinner's arrival at Barbados, but that Stede declined to employ Skinner. Thereupon Howe placed Skinner with a friend who was a lawyer. Skinner's legal career lasted roughly one week, and had left for Mevis.

Skinner returned again to Trinity College that same year, and his religious beliefs were still doubted at the college.

== Writing style ==
Skinner's writing style, in particular his abilities with Latin, are of particular concern to scholars, in that they shed light on his presumed rôle as amanuensis.

Gordon Campbell observes that the Latin that Skinner used in his letter to Pepys "contains small touches which would have been condemned by Milton or any purist", and that Skinner's mistakes "while fairly rare, seem to point to a limited competence in Latin rather than carelessness". Campbell notes that Skinner's occasional slips in Latin, Greek, and Hebrew render suspect the oft-made assertion that Skinner was one of Milton's pupils; pointing out that whilst the Latin of Picard's portion of De doctrina Christiana is "virtually perfect", Skinner's chapters of the same contain "a light sprinkling of errors". (Dr Charles Richard Sumner records 27 errors in Skinner's work, but only four in Picard's, which is longer than Skinner's.)
