= Thomas Master (died 1643) =

English poet and divine (1603–1643)

Thomas Master (1603 – 31 August 1643) was an English poet and divine. He also assisted Edward Herbert, Baron Herbert of Cherbury, in his writing of the Life of Henry VIII. He translated Herbert's work into Latin.

== Life ==
He was born in 1603 at Cote, Gloucestershire, the son of William Master, the rector of Cote, and educated at Cirencester Grammar School and Winchester College. There he obtained a scholarship to New College, Oxford, where he became a perpetual fellow in 1624, and graduated B. A. in 1625, M.A. 1629, and B.D. in 1640/1.

After 1629, he was ordained and in 1637 became rector of Wykeham, Lincolnshire, a sinecure office.

He assisted Edward Herbert in collecting materials for his 'Life of Henry VIII' and in turning this and other of Herbert's works into Latin. He died near Louth in 1643 and was buried in the outer chapel of New College.

== Works ==
- Mensa Lubrica Montgom. illustriss. Domino D. Edwardo Baroni de Cherbury, 1641, a poem in Latin and English on the game of shovel-board. Wood prints the English version in eighty-four lines. It was printed along with Sir Henry Savile's 'Oration to Queen Elizabeth' in 1658 and 1690.
- Μονοστροφικά είς τήν τού Χριστού σταύρωσιν, composed in 1633, and printed along with 'Mensa Lubrica' in 1658. It was translated into Latin by Henry Jacob of Merton College, and into English verse by Abraham Cowley.
- 'Monarchia Britannica sub Elizabetha, Jacobo : in Oratione quam pro more habuit, 1642 Thomas Master, Nov. Coll. Soc., in Capella vi. Kal. Aprilis,' Oxford, 1661, 4to, 1681, 8vo. A letter by Dr. John Lamphire accompanies Master's oration.
- Tho. Masteri Μακαρίτον Novi Coll. quondam Socii Iter Boreale ad ipsius patrem Gulielmum Masterum Cotiæ in Agro Glocestrensi Pastorem, 1675, 4to. This was written in 1637 in prose and verse, and published by the companion of the journey, George Ent. The journey was to Louth, near Wykeham in Lincolnshire.
- The Virgin Mary. A sermon preached in Saint Mary's College (vulgo New College), Oxon., March the 25th, 1641 London, 1710, 8vo. A note to this sermon speaks of Master's memory as 'still pretious.' The sermon occurs again in a collection entitled 'Conjugal Duty set forth,' &c., London, 1732. Wood mentions poems on 'Carolus Redux,' 1623, 'Ad Regem Carolum,' 1625, on Bishop Lake 1626, on Ben Jonson 1637, and on Vaulx as existing in manuscript.

== Sources ==
Malone, Edward A. (October 2008) [online edition; first published 2004]. "Master, Thomas (1602/3–1643)". Oxford Dictionary of National Biography. Oxford Dictionary of National Biography (online ed.). Oxford University Press. doi:10.1093/ref:odnb/18313. (Subscription, Wikipedia Library access or UK public library membership required.)
