= Doctrine and Discipline of Divorce =

Book by John Milton published in 1643

The Doctrine and Discipline of Divorce: Restor'd to the Good of Both Sexes, From the Bondage of Canon Law was published by the English poet and polemicist John Milton on 1 August 1643. An expanded second edition was published on 2 February 1644. The editions were published anonymously, and his name was not associated with the text until they were denounced before the Parliament of England in August 1644. Milton's basic scriptural argument is that Jesus did not abrogate the Mosaic permission for divorce found in Deuteronomy 24:1 because in Matthew 19 he was just addressing a specific audience of Pharisees.

The work was the first of Milton's tracts about divorce. Shortly following their marriage in 1642, Milton and his wife Marie Powell started a period of marital separation. Milton could not apply for a divorce under the English law of his era, but he started promoting the lawfulness of divorce in writing. Although he originally sought only a legal separation from his wife, Milton's research on the topic convinced him that he could convince the English government to legalise divorce.

== Background ==
Milton married in Spring 1642, and shortly after, his wife Marie Powell, left him and returned to live with her mother. The legal statutes of England did not allow for Milton to apply for a divorce and he resorted to promoting the lawfulness of divorce. Although the laws did not change, he wrote four tracts on the topic of divorce, with The Doctrine and Discipline of Divorce as his first tract. The first tract was created during a time of humiliation, and Milton was motivated towards writing on the topic after reading the work of Martin Bucer on divorce. Although it is impossible to know why exactly Powell separated from Milton, it is possible that Powell's family, a strong royalist family, caused a political difference that was exacerbated by the English Civil War.

The first edition of The Doctrine and Discipline of Divorce was published on 1 August 1643, and a revised edition followed on 2 February 1644. A second revision was published in 1645. The work was, according to his nephew Edward Phillips, started from a collection of arguments supporting divorce that would reinforce him emotionally and psychologically while separated from his wife. Although he originally sought only a legal separation from his wife, his research convinced him that he could convince the government to legalise divorce.

== Tract ==
The Doctrine and Discipline of Divorce argues for the ability to have a second chance at marriage. In particular, Milton claims, in Book I, Chapter III, that no one can always know the disposition of their spouse before they enter into marriage. In particular, he argues in a very personal way:

that for all the wariness can be us'd, it may yet befall a discreet man to be mistak'n in his choice: and we have plenty of examples. The sobrest and best govern'd men are lest practiz'd in these affairs; and who knows not that the bashfull mutenes of a virgin may oft-times hide all the unlivelines & naturall sloth which is really unfit for conversation; nor is there that freedom of accesse granted or presum'd, as may suffice to a perfect discerning till too late: and where any indisposition is suspected, what more usuall than the perswasion of friends, that acquaintance, as it encreases, will amend all. And lastly, it is not strange though many who have spent their youth chastly, are in some things not so quick-sighted, while they hast too eagerly to light the nuptiall torch; nor is it therefore that for a modest error a man should forfeit so great a happiness, and no charitable means to release him.

Milton's argument progresses to merging ideas in Genesis and the epistles of Paul to argue, in Chapter IV, that the burning described by Paul was a longing to be united with a spouse:

that desire which God saw it was not good that men should be left alone to burn in; the desire and longing to put off an unkindly solitarines by uniting another body, but not without a fit soule to his in the cheerfull society of wedlock. Which if it were so needfull before the fall, when man was much more perfect in himself, how much more is it needfull now against all the sorrows and casualties of this life to have an intimate and speaking help, a ready and reviving associate in marriage

Milton's argument and stance on divorce continues to the point that he implies that a divorcer could actually be the one who understands and defends marriage the most:

if that mistake have done injury, it fails not to dismisse with recompense, for to retain still, and not to be able to love, is to heap up more injury... He therfore who lacking his due in the most native and humane end of mariage, thinks it better to part then to live sadly and injuriously to that cherful covnant... he I say who therfore seeks to part, is one who highly honours the married life, and would not stain it.

=== Second edition ===
Milton added an address to Parliament that dismisses the possibility of self-interest as a motivator for the work, but later writes:

when points of difficulty are to be discusst, appertaining to the removall of unreasnable wrong and burden from the perplext life of our brother, it is incredible how cold, how dull, and farre from all fellow feeling we are, without the spurre of self-concernment

He also added an explanation that divorce was not just to help wives, and in the XV chapter of Book II writes:

Who can be ignorant that woman was created for man, and not man for woman; and that a husband may be inju'd as insufferably in mariage as a wife. What an injury is it after wedlock not to be belov'd, what to be slighted, what to be contended with a point of house-rule who shall be the head, not for any parity of wisdome, for that were somthing reasonable, but out of female pride.

== Critical review ==
Early responses to Milton's divorce tracts placed Milton as a polygamist and rumours were spread that his motivation was towards both divorce and polygamy. On 13 August 1644, Herbert Palmer read a sermon to Parliament stating:

If any plead Conscience for the Lawfulnesse of Polygamy; (or for divorce for other causes then Christ and His apostles mention: Of which a wicked book is abroad and uncensured, though deserving to be burnt, who Author hath been so impudent as to set his Name to it, and dedicate it to your selves... will you grant a Toleration for all this

The book in question was Milton's Doctrine and Discipline of Divorce, and it is possible that the polygamy comment is in reference to rumours of Milton's pursuit of Miss Davis. This rumour continued to prevail, and Anne Sadleir, in a letter to Roger Williams in 1654, writes, "For Milton's book that you desire I should read, if I be not mistaken, that is he that has wrote a book of the lawfulness of divorce; and if report say true, he had, at that time, two or three wives living."

Although Sadleir was neither Williams' nor Milton's friend, Cyriack Skinner, her nephew, was a close associate with Milton, and it is possible that further information came from her relative Daniel Skinner, who helped Milton write his De Doctrina Christiana and had possible knowledge of Milton's views on divorce and polygamy. Pierre Bayle, in his Nouvelles (1685) and Dictionaire Historique et Critique (1697), describes the idea of Milton approving of divorce and polygamy as common knowledge and traces these views to Milton's problems with his wife. Nicolaus Moller, in his De Polygamia Omni (A study of All Polygamy) (1710), lists Milton twice. An obituary for Milton in Allgemeine Schau-buhne der Welt, claims that "He was a great defender of the liberty of divorce (as he himself divorced himself from six wives one after the other)".

Modern critic Annabel Patterson believed that the tract "presents a logical case for the reform of divorce law, superimposed on a subtext of emotional chaos".
