= Thomas Jefferson Medal for Distinguished Achievement in the Arts, Humanities, and Social Sciences =

Thomas Jefferson Medal
- Awarded for: distinguished achievement in the arts, humanities, or social sciences
- Location: Washington, D.C.
- Country: United States
- Presented by: American Philosophical Society
- First award: 1993
- Website: https://www.amphilsoc.org/prizes/thomas-jefferson-medal-distinguished-achievement-arts-humanities-and-social-sciences

The Thomas Jefferson Medal for Distinguished Achievement in the Arts, Humanities, and Social Sciences is awarded by the American Philosophical Society and is that society's "highest award for the arts, humanities, and social sciences."

The Thomas Jefferson Medal was authorized by an act of Congress in 1993, in honor of the 250th anniversary of the founding of the American Philosophical Society.

== Recipients ==
Thomas Jefferson Medal recipients are as follows:

- 2026 Robert D. Putnam

2018

- Toni Morrison

2007

- Richard Rorty

2005

- Elliott Carter

2004

- Bernard M. W. Knox

2003

- Frederick H. Burkhardt

2002

- Bernard Lewis

2001

- I.M. Pei

2000

- Helen Hennessey Vendler

1999

- Daniel J. Boorstin

1998

- Albert O. Hirschman

1997

- Roland M. Frye

1996

- Homer Thompson

1995

- George F. Kennan

1994

- Arthur Link

1993

- King Juan Carlos I, on behalf of Spain
- Bernard Bailyn
- Warren E. Burger
- John Hope Franklin
- Peter Paret
- Hanna Gray
- Daniel Patrick Moynihan

== See also ==
- Lists of humanities awards
- List of general awards in the humanities
