= Claude de L'Estoile =

French playwright and poet

Claude de L'Estoile (1602, Paris – May 1652) was a French playwright and poet. He was a founder member of the Académie française.

== Biography ==
Third son of Pierre de L'Estoile he inherited a fortune, he devoted himself entirely to poetry and belles-lettres and became one of the first members of the French Academy in 1634 . He is the author of odes and stanzas and two plays, the beautiful slave, tragicomedy published in 1643, and Intrigue tricksters, comedy released in 1644 . A third part, Secretary of St. Innocent, remained unfinished. It also produces two ballets, The Ballet happy shipwreck and Maistre Galimathias represented before the king in 1626, and has also collaborated with François le Métel de Boisrobert, Pierre Corneille, Jean Rotrou and Guillaume Colletet the said parts "of five authors, "The Blind Smyrna and La Comédie des Tuileries, played in 1638.

Paul Pellisson told him that "when had composed a book he was reading to his servant (as also called Malherbe) in order to know if he had done well, believing that to not had their full perfection if they were not filled with a certain beauty that makes people feel even the roughest, and coarser. [...] It was an extraordinarily complexion brought to love, and this passion was almost all the troubles and all the evils of his life. [...] He labored with extraordinary care, and pondered a hundred times on the same things, hence it is that we have so few books about him."

His father, in his lifetime lived with him at the Hotel de Saint-Clair, at 40 rue Saint-André-des-Arts, in the current arrondissement of Paris, which he inherited.

== Works ==
- Le ballet du naufrage heureux (1626)
- Maistre Galimathias... (1626)
- Vers sur le sujet du ballet du Roi (1627)
- La Comédie des Tuileries (1638)
- L'aveugle de Smyrne (1638) ou (1638)
- La belle esclave (1643)
- L'intrigue des filous (1644)
