= Colasterion =

1645 work by John Milton

Colasterion (from the Greek word for "instrument of punishment" or "house of correction") was published by the English poet and polemicist John Milton with his Tetrachordon on 4 March 1645. The tract is a response to an anonymous pamphlet attacking the first edition of The Doctrine and Discipline of Divorce. Milton makes no new arguments, but harshly takes to task the "trivial author".

In the tract, Milton promotes an idea of marital separation, and, in his situation, a separation from his previous wife.

== Background ==
Milton married in Spring 1642, and shortly after, his wife Marie Powell, left him and returned to live with her mother. The legal statutes of England did not allow for Milton to apply for a divorce and he resorted to promoting the lawfulness of divorce. Although the laws did not change, he wrote four tracts on the topic of divorce, with The Doctrine and Discipline of Divorce as his first tract. The first tract was created during a time of humiliation, and Milton was motivated towards writing on the topic after reading the work of Martin Bucer on divorce. Although it is impossible to know why exactly Powell separated from Milton, it is possible that Powell's family, a strong royalist family, caused a political difference that was exacerbated by the English Civil War.

During the time of composing the tracts, Milton attempted to pursue another woman known only as Miss Davis, but this resulted in failure. He continued to pursue the topic until his wife returned to him and they were to reconcile. This reconciliation could have come in part from the failure of the royalists, including Powell's family, to prevail during the English Civil War and lacking justification to further distance themselves from Milton. According to George Thomason, an early collector of English Civil War tracts, Colasterion was published on 4 March 1645 along with Tetrachordon.

== Tract ==
Colasterion is a personal response to the anonymous pamphlet An Answer to a Book, Intituled, The Doctrine and Discipline of Divorce, or, A Pleas for Ladies and Gentlewomen, and all other Married Women against Divorce (1644). The work contains many insults against the anonymous author, including "wind-egg", "Serving-man", and "conspicuous gull". In the tract, Milton promotes an idea of marital separation, and, in his situation, a separation from his previous wife.
