= Tetrachordon =

1645 work by John Milton

Tetrachordon (from the Greek τετράχορδον "four stringed") was published by the English poet and polemicist John Milton with his Colasterion on 4 March 1645. The title symbolizes Milton's attempt to connect four passages of Biblical scripture to rationalize the legalization of divorce.

Milton connects four Scriptural passages (Genesis 1:27–28, Deuteronomy 24:1, Matthew 5:31–32 and 19:2–9, and I Corinthians 7:10-16) in order to argue that Scripture supports the legalization of divorce. In addition to this argument, the work is targeted at Herbert Palmer, who attacked Milton's The Doctrine and Discipline in a sermon to Parliament, and pamphlets published in support of Palmer's position.

== Background ==
Milton married in spring 1642, and shortly after, his wife, Mary Powell, left him and returned to live with her mother. The laws of England did not allow for Milton to apply for a divorce and he resorted to promoting the lawfulness of divorce. Although the laws did not change, he wrote four tracts on the topic of divorce, with The Doctrine and Discipline of Divorce as his first tract. The first tract was created during a time of humiliation, and Milton was motivated towards writing on the topic after reading the work of Martin Bucer on divorce. Although it is impossible to know why exactly Powell separated from Milton, it is possible that Powell's family, a strong royalist family, caused a political difference that was exacerbated by the English Civil War.

During the time of composing the tracts, Milton attempted to pursue another woman known only as Miss Davis, but this resulted in failure. He continued to pursue the topic until his wife returned to him and they were to reconcile. This reconciliation could have come in part from the failure of the royalists, including Powell's family, to prevail during the English Civil War and lacking justification to further distance themselves from Milton.

== Tract ==
Milton connects four Scriptural passages (Genesis 1:27–28, Deuteronomy 24:1, Matthew 5:31–32 and 19:2–9, and I Corinthians 7:10-16) in order to argue that Scripture supports the legalization of divorce. In addition to this argument, the work is targeted at Herbert Palmer, who attacked Milton's The Doctrine and Discipline in a sermon to Parliament, and pamphlets published in support of Palmer's position. In particular, Milton claims:

The impudence therefore, since he waigh'd so little what a gross revile that was to give his equall, I send him back again for a phylactery to stitch upon his arrogance, that censures not onely before conviction so bitterly without so much as one reason giv'n, but censures the Congregation of his Governors to their faces, for not being so hasty as himself to censure.

Attacks such as this demonstrate how Milton abandoned his desire to reform the laws of England in order to focus on satirizing his enemies. This is not to say that Milton abandons any argument in regards to divorce, and he is sure to argue the point: if we seek "an impartial definition, what Mariage is, and what is not Mariage; it will undoubtedly be safest, fairest, and most with our obedience, to enquire... how it was in the beginning".

Furthermore, Milton argues that St. Paul, in 1 Corinthians 11, "ends the controversie by explaining that the woman is not primarily and immediately the image of God, but in reference to the man... he the image and glory of God, she the glory of the man: he is not for her, but she for him". This leads to Milton taking a misogynistic stance relying on St. Paul's characteristics of women as inferior. Although, he does allow for some exceptions, his standard view on the matter is expressed when he argues:

But that which far more easily and obediently follows from this verse, is that, seeing woman was purposely made for man, and he her head, it cannot stand before the breath of this divine utterance, that man the portraiture of God, joyning to himself for his intended good and solace an inferiour sexe, should so become her thrall, whose wilfulness or inability to be a wife frustrates the occasionall end of her creation, but that he may acquitt himself to freedom by his naturall birthright, and that indelible character of priority which God crown'd him with.

== Critical review ==
Shortly after printing, John Wilkins categorized Tetrachordon under "Of Divorce and Polygamy", uniting the view of Milton as a divorcer and a polygamist. Although this may have been done by coincidence, Martin Kempe's 1677 bibliography, Charismatum Sacrorum Trias, sive Bibliotheca Anglorum Thelogica (Triad of Sacred Unctions, or the Theological Library of the English), lists Milton under his two sections of De Divortio (of divorce) and De Polygamia (of polygamy).
