= Licensing Order of 1643 =

Censorship order in Parliamentary England

The Ordinance for the Regulating of Printing, also known as the Licensing Order of 1643, instituted pre-publication censorship upon Parliamentary England. Milton's Areopagitica was written specifically against this ordinance.

== Abolition of the Star Chamber ==
Parliament, by the Habeas Corpus Act 1640, abolished the Star Chamber in July 1641, which led to the de facto cessation of censorship. The loosening of controls led to an immediate rise in publishing. Between 1640 and 1660, at least 300 news publications were produced..

== The Licensing Order of 1643 ==
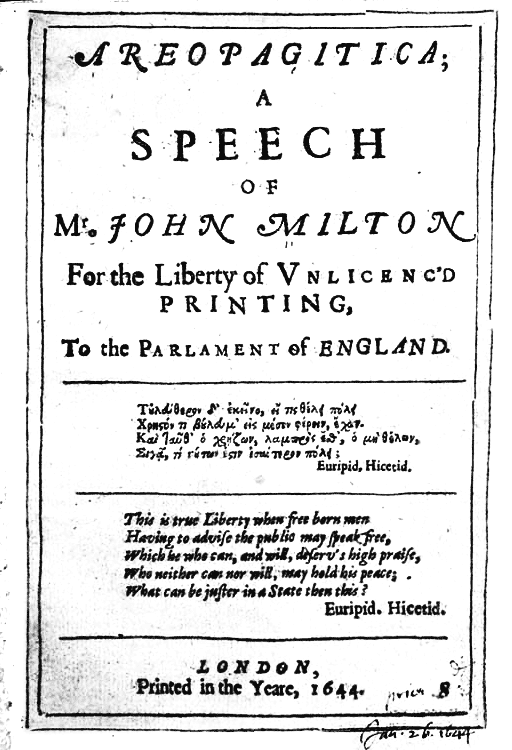
First page of John Milton's 1644 edition of Areopagitica, in it he argued forcefully against the Licensing Order of 1643.

The abolition of the Star Chamber and the severe 1637 Star Chamber Decree, however, did not indicate Parliament's intention to permit freedom of speech and of the press; rather it indicated a desire on the part of Parliament to replace the royal censorship machinery with its own.

Motivated by a desire to eliminate chaos and piracy in the printing industry, protect parliamentary activities and proceedings from its opponents, suppress royalist propaganda and check the widening currency of various sects’ radical ideas, Parliament instituted a new state-controlled censoring apparatus in An Ordinance for the Regulating of Printing of 14 June 1643.

The Licensing Order reintroduced almost all of the stringent censorship machinery of the 1637 Star Chamber Decree, including:

- pre-publication licensing.
- registration of all printing materials with the names of author, printer and publisher in the Register at Stationers’ Hall.
- search, seizure, and destruction of any books offensive to the government.
- arrest and imprisonment of any offensive writers, printers and publishers.

The Stationers' Company was given the responsibility of acting as censor, in return for a monopoly of the printing trade.

=== Resistance and unlicensed printing ===
The Licensing Order of 1643, while aimed at controlling the press and curbing dissent, inadvertently fuelled the growth of an underground printing network. Radical Puritans and sectarian groups, finding their voices stifled by the strict censorship, turned to clandestine presses to disseminate their ideas. Figures like Richard Overton, in collaboration with individuals like Nicholas Tew, established secret printing operations to circumvent the restrictions. This resistance highlighted the inherent tension between the desire for control and the urge for free expression, even amidst the turmoil of the English Civil Wars.

== Milton's Areopagitica ==
In protest, English poet and political writer, John Milton published the Areopagitica: A speech of Mr. John Milton for the Liberty of Unlicenc'd Printing, to the Parlament of England in November, 1644 (16 months following the Licensing Order).

== Censorship during the Restoration ==
After the Restoration of the monarchy in the 1660s, even tighter controls were imposed on the press. A single individual was given the authority to publish an official newspaper along with the responsibility of serving as censor for all other publications.

== 1695: the Licensing Order lapses ==
With the Glorious Revolution of 1688, William and Mary were invited to ascend the throne on the condition that they agree to the terms spelled out in the Declaration of Rights. This came to be understood as part of the British "constitution" that American patriots cited as the source of their own freedoms as "Englishmen".

The Licensing Order was allowed to lapse on 17 April 1695, when the House of Commons declined to renew it and stated its reasons, beginning with "Because it revives, and re-enacts, a Law which in no-wise answered the End for which it was made". One historian observes that the act was allowed to lapse "not because it infringed on the liberties of Englishmen but because it conferred a monopoly on the crown and a very limited number of booksellers" and that the reasons for allowing the lapse "were commercial, not constitutional." Although most accounts stipulate that "the Licensing act expired in 1695", the "expiration" was not the result of a simple lapse of attention on the part of the government. Instead, the freedoms established by the Declaration of Rights created a more open society, and an explosion of print was the result. The number of printing houses in England grew in thirty years from 20 in 1695 to 103 (75 in London alone) by 1724. In England, the emergence of publications like the Tatler and the Spectator are given credit for creating a 'bourgeois public sphere' that allowed for a free exchange of ideas and information. In the American colonies, the end of the Licensing Act also sparked the creation of new publications and set the stage for the battle of words that would lead to the American Revolution in the second half of the eighteenth century.

== See also ==
- UK constitutional law
- Digital Services Act
- Licensing of the Press Act 1662
- Statute of Anne, 1709
