= 1646 in poetry =

Nationality words link to articles with information on the nation's poetry or literature (for instance, Irish or France).

== Events ==
- May 6 – American colonial poet Anne Bradstreet becomes a founding mother of Andover Parish (modern-day North Andover), Massachusetts.
- English clergyman, poet and dramatist Jasper Mayne is made a Doctor of Divinity.

== Works published ==
- Guillaume Colletet, Le Banquet des Poètes
- Richard Crashaw, Steps to the Temple: Sacred poems, with other delights of the muses (expanded edition 1648)
- Jean Ogier de Gombauld, Poésies
- Martin Lluelyn, Men-Miracles: With other poemes
- John Milton, Poems of Mr John Milton, Both English and Latin (see below)
- James Shirley, Poems
- Sir John Suckling, Fragmenta Aurea, works, including letters, poems and plays
- Henry Vaughan, Poems, with the Tenth Satyre of Juvenal Englished
- George Wither, Opobalsamum Anglicanum

=== Milton's Poems ===
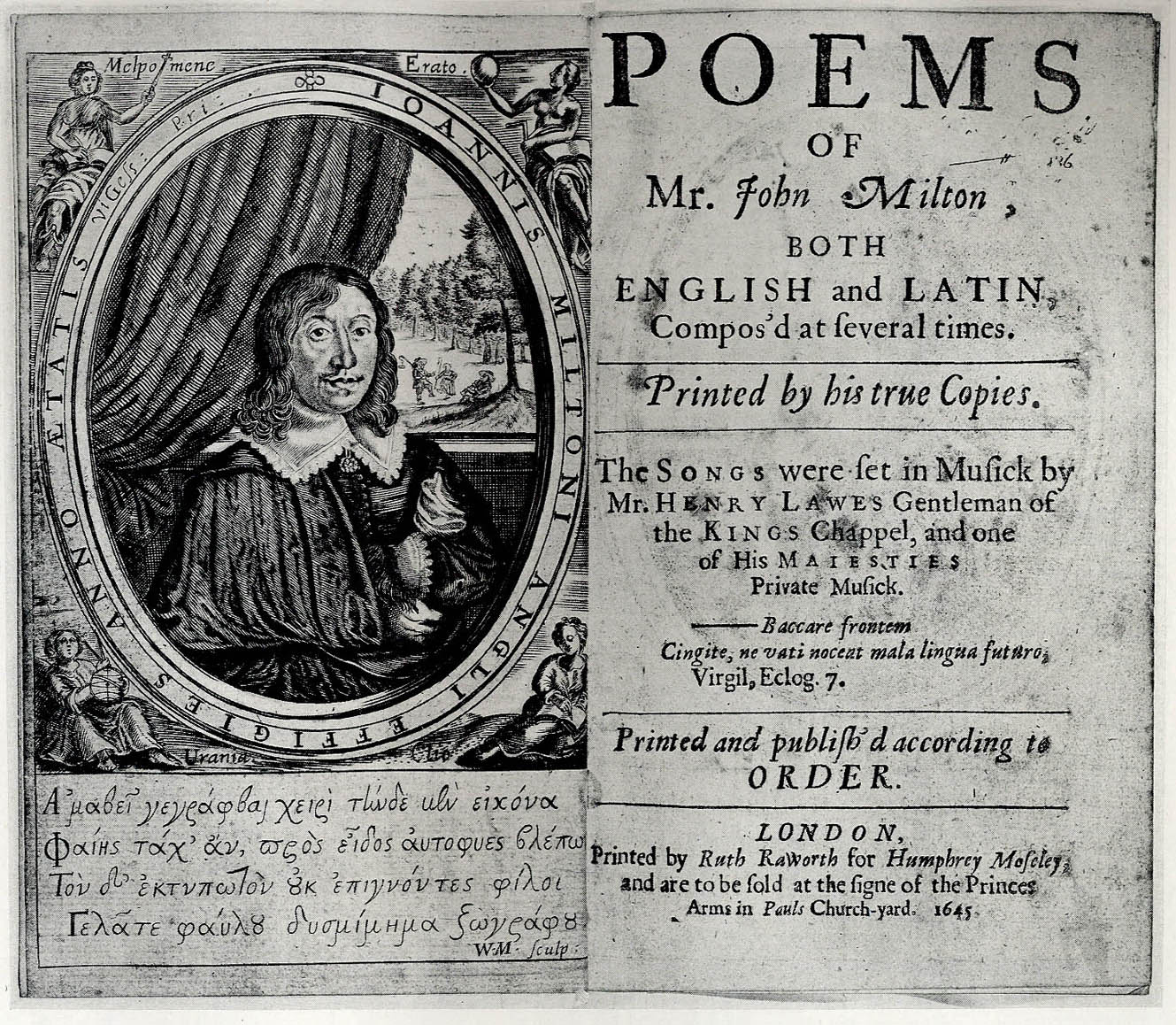
Titlepage to 1645 Poems, with frontispice depicting Milton surrounded by four muses

- John Milton, Poems of Mr. John Milton both English and Latin, compos'd at several times; published this year, although the book states 1645; the volume's frontispiece contains an extremely unflattering portrait of Milton by the engraver William Marshall, under which Milton placed satirical verses in Greek denying any resemblance (see revised edition, 1673); the volume includes these poems:
    - On the Morning of Christ's Nativity
    - A Paraphrase on Psalm 114
    - Psalm 136
    - The Passion an ode possibly written in 1630; it connects Christ's Crucifixion with his Incarnation; linked to two other poems of Milton: On the Morning of Christ's Nativity and Upon the Circumcision
    - On Time
    - Upon the Circumcision
    - At A Solemn Musick
    - An Epitaph on the Marchioness of Winchester
    - Song on May Morning
    - On Shakespeare
    - On the University Carrier [Hobson's Epitaph]
    - Another on the Same
    - L'Allegro
    - Il Penseroso
    - Sonnets 1-10
    - Arcades
    - Lycidas
    - A Mask [Comus]

== Births ==
Death years link to the corresponding "[year] in poetry" article:

- February 4 – Hans Erasmus Aßmann (died 1699), German statesman and poet
- March 19 – Michael Kongehl (died 1710), German baroque poet
- Pan Lei (died 1708), Chinese Qing dynasty scholar and poet
- Benedetto Menzini (died 1704), Italian Roman Catholic priest and poet

== Deaths ==
Birth years link to the corresponding "[year] in poetry" article:

- December 28 – François Maynard (born 1582), French poet

== See also ==
- Poetry
- 17th century in poetry
- 17th century in literature
- Cavalier poets in England, who supported the monarch against the puritans in the English Civil War
