= Metaphysical poets =

Term used to describe a loose group of British lyric poets of the 17th century

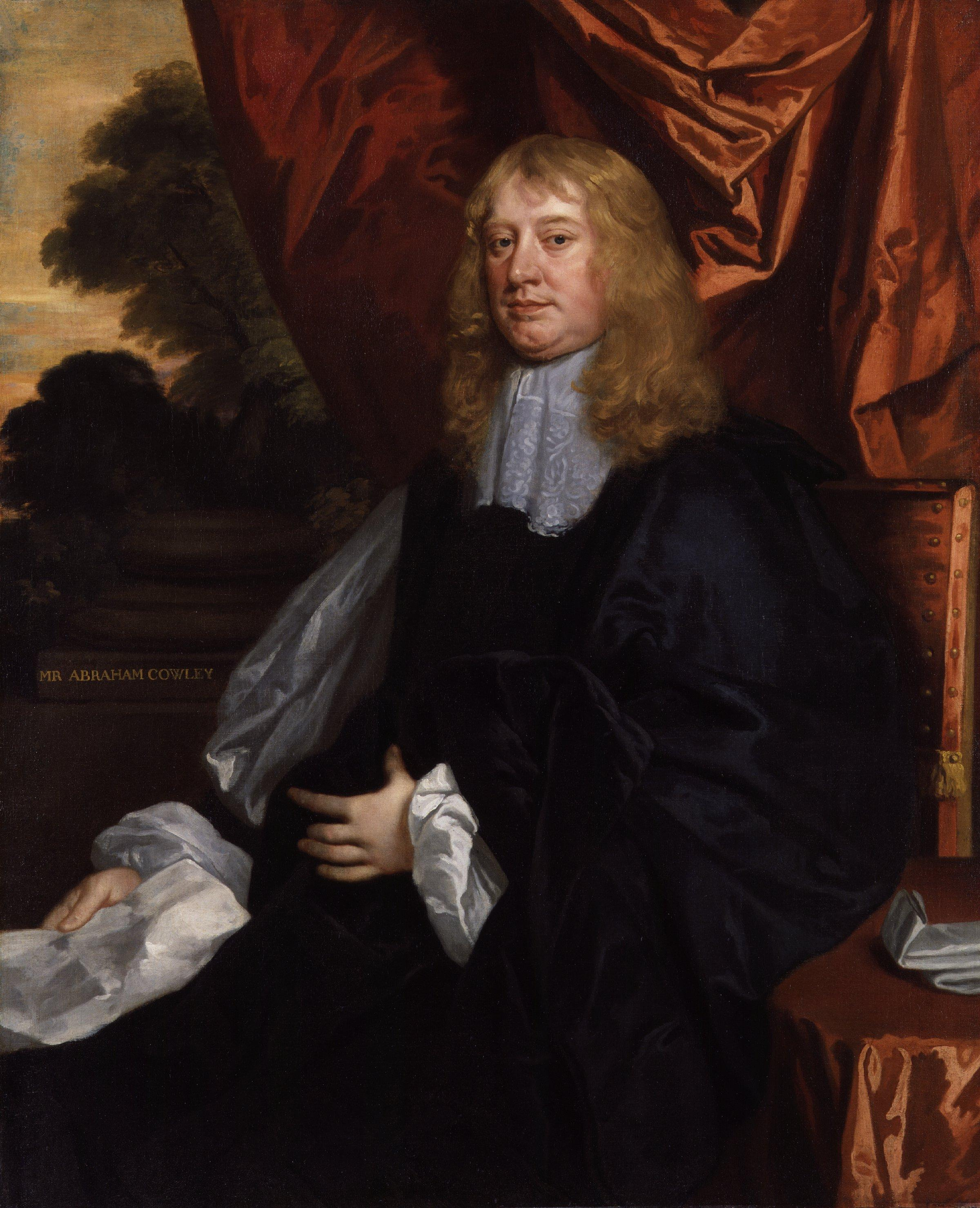
The poet Abraham Cowley, in whose biography Samuel Johnson first named and described Metaphysical poetry

The term Metaphysical poets was coined by the critic Samuel Johnson to describe a loose group of 17th-century English poets whose work was characterised by the inventive use of conceits, and by a greater emphasis on the spoken rather than lyrical quality of their verse. These poets were not formally affiliated and few were highly regarded until 20th century attention established their importance.

Given the lack of coherence as a movement, and the diversity of style among poets, it has been suggested that calling them Baroque poets after their era might be more useful. Once the Metaphysical style was established, however, it was occasionally adopted by other and especially younger poets to fit appropriate circumstances.

== Origin of the name ==
In the chapter on Abraham Cowley in his Lives of the Most Eminent English Poets (1779–81), Samuel Johnson refers to the beginning of the 17th century in which there "appeared a race of writers that may be termed the metaphysical poets". This does not necessarily imply that he intended "metaphysical" to be used in its true sense, in that he was probably referring to a witticism of John Dryden, who said of John Donne:

He affects the metaphysics, not only in his satires, but in his amorous verses, where nature only should reign; and perplexes the minds of the fair sex with nice speculations of philosophy, when he should engage their hearts, and entertain them with the softnesses of love. In this...Mr. Cowley has copied him to a fault.

Probably the only writer before Dryden to speak of the new style of poetry was Drummond of Hawthornden, who in an undated letter from the 1630s made the charge that "some men of late, transformers of everything, consulted upon her reformation, and endeavoured to abstract her to metaphysical ideas and scholastical quiddities, denuding her of her own habits, and those ornaments with which she hath amused the world some thousand years".

== Criticism ==
Part of the series on
Modern scholasticism
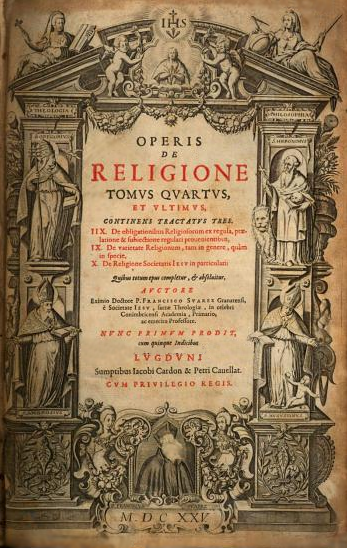
Title page of the Operis de religione (1625) from Francisco Suárez
Background

Protestant Reformation
Counter-Reformation
Aristotelianism
Scholasticism
Patristics

Modern scholastics

Second scholasticism of the School of Salamanca
Lutheran scholasticism during Lutheran orthodoxy
Ramism among the Reformed orthodoxy
Metaphysical poets in the Church of England

Reactions within Christianity

Jesuits against Jansenism
Labadists against the Jesuits
Pietism against orthodox Lutherans
Nadere Reformatie within Dutch Calvinism
Richard Hooker against the Ramists

Reactions within philosophy

Neologists against Lutherans
Spinozists against Dutch Calvinists
Deists against Anglicanism
John Locke against Bishop Stillingfleet

=== The Augustans ===
Johnson's assessment of "metaphysical poetry" was not at all flattering:

The metaphysical poets were men of learning, and, to show their learning was their whole endeavour; but, unluckily resolving to show it in rhyme, instead of writing poetry, they only wrote verses, and, very often, such verses as stood the trial of the finger better than of the ear; for the modulation was so imperfect, that they were only found to be verses by counting the syllables... The most heterogeneous ideas are yoked by violence together; nature and art are ransacked for illustrations, comparisons, and allusions; their learning instructs, and their subtilty surprises; but the reader commonly thinks his improvement dearly bought, and, though he sometimes admires, is seldom pleased.

Johnson was repeating the disapproval of earlier critics who upheld the rival canons of Augustan poetry, for though Johnson may have given the Metaphysical "school" the name by which it is now known, he was far from being the first to condemn 17th-century poetic usage of conceit and word-play. John Dryden had already satirised the Baroque taste for them in his Mac Flecknoe and Joseph Addison, in quoting him, singled out the poetry of George Herbert as providing a flagrant example.

=== 20th-century recognition ===
During the course of the 1920s, T.S. Eliot did much to establish the importance of the Metaphysical school, both through his critical writing and by applying their method in his own work. By 1961 A. Alvarez was commenting that "it may perhaps be a little late in the day to be writing about the Metaphysicals. The great vogue for Donne passed with the passing of the Anglo-American experimental movement in modern poetry."

A further two decades later, a hostile view was expressed that emphasis on their importance had been an attempt by Eliot and his followers to impose a "high Anglican and royalist literary history" on 17th-century English poetry. But Colin Burrow's dissenting opinion, in the Oxford Dictionary of National Biography, is that the term 'Metaphysical poets' still retains some value. For one thing, Donne's poetry had considerable influence on subsequent poets, who emulated his style. And there are several instances in which 17th-century poets used the word 'metaphysical' in their work, meaning that Samuel Johnson's description has some foundation in the usage of the previous century. However, the term does isolate the English poets from those who shared similar stylistic traits in Europe and America. Since the 1960s, therefore, it has been argued that gathering all of these under the heading of Baroque poets would be more helpfully inclusive.

== Defining the canon ==
There is no scholarly consensus regarding which English poets or poems fit within the Metaphysical genre. In his initial use of the term, Johnson quoted just three poets: Abraham Cowley, John Donne, and John Cleveland. Colin Burrow later singled out Donne, George Herbert, Henry Vaughan, Andrew Marvell, and Richard Crashaw as 'central figures', while naming many more, all or part of whose work has been identified as sharing its characteristics.

Two key anthologists in particular were responsible for identifying common stylistic traits among 17th-century poets. Herbert Grierson's Metaphysical Lyrics and Poems of the Seventeenth Century (1921) was important in defining the Metaphysical canon. In addition, Helen Gardner's Metaphysical Poets (1957) included 'proto-metaphysical' writers such as William Shakespeare and Sir Walter Raleigh and, extending into the Restoration, brought in Edmund Waller and Rochester. While comprehensive, her selection, as Burrow remarks, so dilutes the style as to make it "virtually coextensive with seventeenth-century poetry".

Late additions to the Metaphysical canon have included sacred poets of both England and America who had been virtually unknown for centuries. John Norris was better known as a Platonist philosopher. Thomas Traherne's poetry remained unpublished until the start of the 20th century. The work of Edward Taylor, who is now counted as the outstanding English-language poet of North America, was only discovered in 1937.

== A sense of community ==
Johnson's definition of the Metaphysical poets was that of a hostile critic looking back at the style of the previous century. In 1958 Alvarez proposed an alternative approach in a series of lectures eventually published as The School of Donne. This was to look at the practice and self-definition of the circle of friends about Donne, who were the recipients of many of his verse letters. They were a group of some fifteen young professionals with an interest in poetry, many of them poets themselves although, like Donne for much of his life, few of them published their work. Instead, copies were circulated in manuscript among them. Uncertain ascriptions resulted in some poems from their fraternity being ascribed to Donne by later editors.

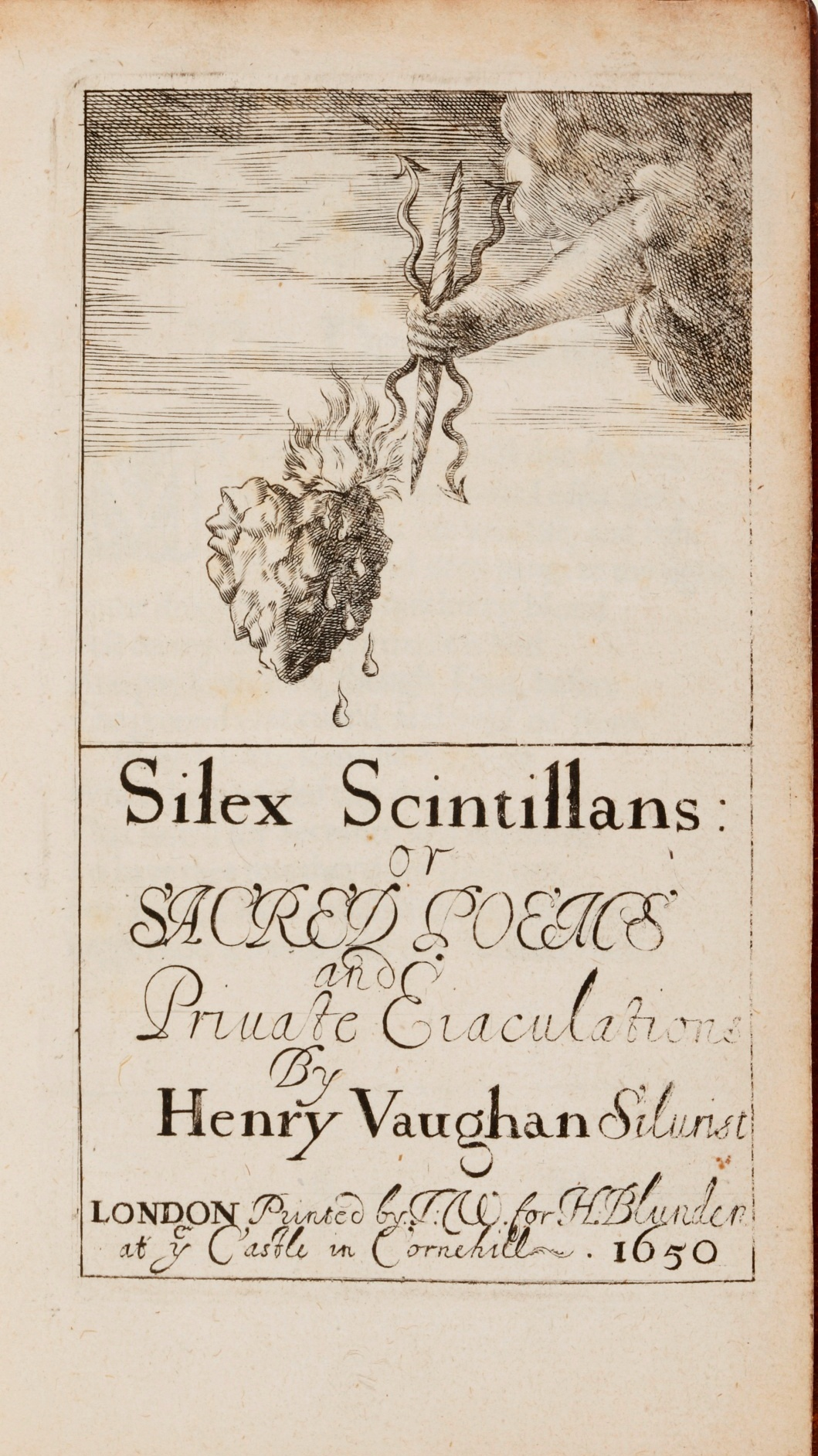
The title page of Henry Vaughan's Silex Scintillans, 1650

A younger second generation was a close-knit group of courtiers, some of them with family or professional ties to Donne's circle, who initially borrowed Donne's manner to cultivate wit. Among them were Lord Herbert of Cherbury and his brother George, whose mother Magdalen was another recipient of verse letters by Donne. Eventually George Herbert, Henry Vaughan and Richard Crashaw, all of whom knew each other, took up the religious life and extended their formerly secular approach into this new area. A later generation of Metaphysical poets, writing during the Commonwealth, became increasingly more formulaic and lacking in vitality. These included Cleveland and his imitators as well as such transitional figures as Cowley and Marvell.

What all had in common, according to Alvarez, was esteem, not for metaphysics but for intelligence. Johnson's remark that "To write on their plan it was at least necessary to read and think" only echoed its recognition a century and a half before in the many tributes paid to Donne on his death. For example, Jasper Mayne's comment that for the fellow readers of his work, "Wee are thought wits, when 'tis understood". Coupled with it went a vigorous sense of the speaking voice. It begins with the rough versification of the satires written by Donne and others in his circle such as Everard Gilpin and John Roe. Later it modulates into the thoughtful religious poems of the next generation with their exclamatory or conversational openings and their sense of the mind playing over the subject and examining it from all sides. Helen Gardner too had noted the dramatic quality of this poetry as a personal address of argument and persuasion, whether talking to a physical lover, to God, to Christ's mother Mary, or to a congregation of believers.

=== Elegists ===
A different approach to defining the community of readers is to survey who speaks of whom, and in what manner, in their poetry. On the death of Donne, it is natural that his friend Edward Herbert should write him an elegy full of high-flown and exaggerated Metaphysical logic. In a similar way, Abraham Cowley marks the deaths of Crashaw and of another member of Donne's literary circle, Henry Wotton. Here, however, though Cowley acknowledges Crashaw briefly as a writer ("Poet and saint"), his governing focus is on how Crashaw's goodness transcended his change of religion. The elegy is as much an exercise in a special application of logic as was Edward Herbert's on Donne. Henry Wotton, on the other hand, is not remembered as a writer at all, but instead for his public career. The conjunction of his learning and role as ambassador becomes the extended metaphor on which the poem's tribute turns.

Twelve "Elegies upon the Author" accompanied the posthumous first collected edition of Donne's work, Poems by J.D. with elegies of the author’s death (1633), and were reprinted in subsequent editions over the course of the next two centuries. Though the poems were often cast in a suitably Metaphysical style, half were written by fellow clergymen, few of whom are remembered for their poetry. Among those who are, were Henry King and Jasper Mayne, who was soon to quit authorship for clerical orders. Bishop Richard Corbet's poetry writing was also nearly over by now and he contributed only a humorous squib. Other churchmen included Henry Valentine (fl 1600–1650), Edward Hyde (1607–1659) and Richard Busby. Two poets, Lucius Cary, 2nd Viscount Falkland and Thomas Carew, who were joined in the 1635 edition by Sidney Godolphin, had links with the heterodox Great Tew Circle. They also served as courtiers, as did another contributor, Endymion Porter. In addition, Carew had been in the service of Edward Herbert.

Izaak Walton's link with Donne's circle was more tangential. He had friends within the Great Tew Circle but at the time of his elegy was working as a researcher for Henry Wotton, who intended writing a life of the poet. This project Walton inherited after his death, publishing it under his own name in 1640; it was followed by a life of Wotton himself that prefaced the collection of Wotton's works in 1651. A life of George Herbert followed them in 1670. The links between Donne's elegists were thus of a different order from those between Donne and his circle of friends, often no more than professional acquaintanceship. And once the poetic style had been launched, its tone and approach remained available as a model for later writers who might not necessarily commit themselves so wholly to it.

== Characteristics ==
=== Free from former artificial styles ===
Grierson attempted to characterise the main traits of Metaphysical poetry in the introduction to his anthology. For him it begins with a break with the formerly artificial style of their antecedents to one free from poetic diction or conventions. Johnson acknowledged as much in pointing out that their style was not to be achieved "by descriptions copied from descriptions, by imitations borrowed from imitations, by traditional imagery and hereditary similes".

=== European Baroque influences, including use of conceits ===
Another characteristic singled out by Grierson is the Baroque European dimension of the poetry, its "fantastic conceits and hyperboles which was the fashion throughout Europe". Again Johnson had been partly before him in describing the style as "borrowed from Marino and his followers". It was from the use of conceits particularly that the writing of these European counterparts was known, Concettismo in Italian, Conceptismo in Spanish. In fact Crashaw had made several translations from Marino. Grierson noted in addition that the slightly older poet, Robert Southwell (who is included in Gardner's anthology as a precursor), had learned from the antithetical, conceited style of Italian poetry and knew Spanish as well.

The European dimension of the Catholic poets Crashaw and Southwell has been commented on by others. In the opinion of one critic of the 1960s, defining the extent of the Baroque style in 17th-century English poetry "may even be said to have taken the place of the earlier discussion of the metaphysical". Southwell counts as a notable pioneer of the style, in part because his formative years were spent outside England. And the circumstance that Crashaw's later life was also spent outside England contributed to making him, in the eyes of Mario Praz, "the greatest exponent of the Baroque style in any language".

Crashaw is frequently cited by Harold B. Segel when typifying the characteristics of The Baroque Poem, but he goes on to compare the work of several other Metaphysical poets to their counterparts in both Western and Eastern Europe. The use of conceits was common not only across the Continent, but also elsewhere in England among the Cavalier poets, including such elegists of Donne as Carew and Godolphin. As an example of the rhetorical way in which various forms of repetition accumulate in creating a tension, only relieved by their resolution at the end of the poem, Segel instances the English work of Henry King as well as Ernst Christoph Homburg's in German and Jan Andrzej Morsztyn's in Polish. In addition, Marvell's "To His Coy Mistress" is given as a famous example of the use of hyperbole common to many other Metaphysical poets and typical of the Baroque style too.

=== Wordplay and wit ===
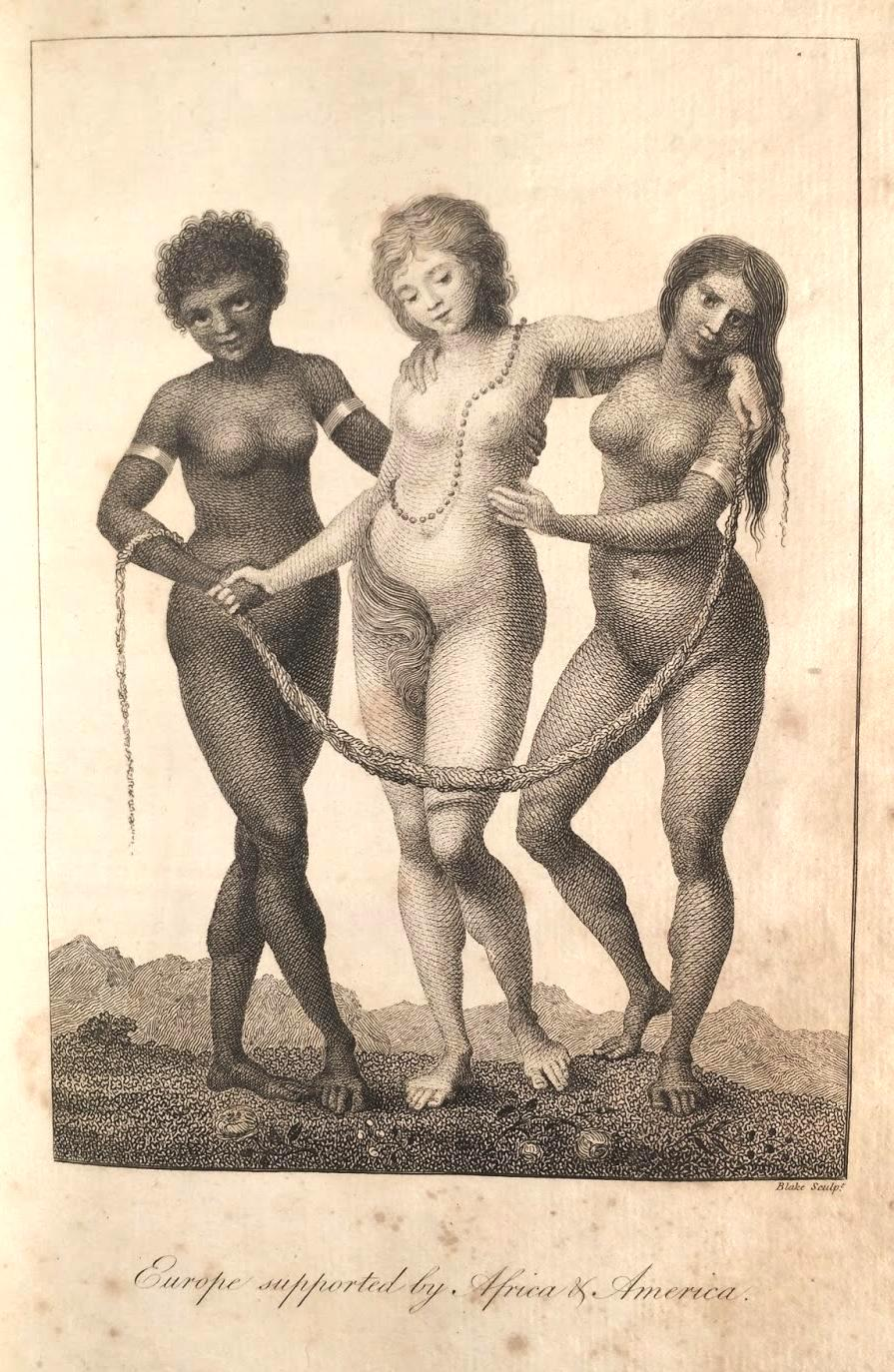
"Europe supported by Africa and America", William Blake, 1796

The way George Herbert and other English poets "torture one poor word ten thousand ways", in Dryden's phrase, finds its counterpart in a poem like "Constantijn Huygens’ Sondagh (Sunday) with its verbal variations on the word 'sun'. Wordplay on this scale was not confined to Metaphysical poets, moreover, but can be found in the multiple meanings of 'will' that occur in Shakespeare's "Sonnet 135". and of 'sense' in John Davies’ "That the Soul is more than a Perfection or Reflection of the Sense". Such rhetorical devices are common in Baroque writing and frequently used by poets not generally identified with the Metaphysical style.

Another striking example occurs in Baroque poems celebrating "black beauty", built on the opposition between the norm of feminine beauty and instances that challenge that commonplace. There are examples in sonnets by Philip Sidney, where the key contrast is between 'black' and 'bright'; by Shakespeare, contrasting 'black' and various meanings of 'fair'; and by Edward Herbert, where black, dark and night contrast with light, bright and spark. Black hair and eyes are the subject in the English examples, while generally it is the colour of the skin with which Romance poets deal in much the same paradoxical style. Examples include Edward Herbert's "La Gialletta Gallante or The sun-burn'd exotic Beauty" and Marino's "La Bella Schiave" (The Beautiful Slave). Still more dramatically, Luis de Góngora's En la fiesta del Santísimo Sacramento (At the Feast of the Blessed Sacrament) introduces a creole dialogue between two black women concerning the nature of their beauty.

Much of this display of wit hinges upon enduring literary conventions and is only distinguished as belonging to this or that school by the mode of treatment. But English writing goes further by employing ideas and images derived from contemporary scientific or geographical discoveries to examine religious and moral questions, often with an element of casuistry. Bringing greater depth and a more thoughtful quality to their poetry, such features distinguish the work of the Metaphysical poets from the more playful and decorative use of the Baroque style among their contemporaries.

=== Platonic influence ===
Ideas of Platonic love had earlier played their part in the love poetry of others, often to be ridiculed there, although Edward Herbert and Abraham Cowley took the theme of "Platonic Love" more seriously in their poems with that title.

In the poetry of Henry Vaughan, as in that of another of the late discoveries, Thomas Traherne, Neo-Platonic concepts played an important part and contributed to some striking poems dealing with the soul's remembrance of perfect beauty in the eternal realm and its spiritual influence.

== Stylistic echoes ==
Long before it was so-named, the Metaphysical poetic approach was an available model for others outside the interlinking networks of 17th century writers, especially young men who had yet to settle for a particular voice. The poems written by John Milton while still at university are a case in point and include some that were among his earliest published work, well before their inclusion in his Poems of 1645. His On the Morning of Christ's Nativity (1629) and "On Shakespear" (1630) appear in Grierson's anthology; the latter poem and "On the University Carrier" (1631) appear in Gardner's too. It may be remembered also that at the time Milton composed these, the slightly younger John Cleveland was a fellow student at Christ's College, Cambridge, on whom the influence of the Metaphysical style was more lasting.

In Milton's case, there is an understandable difference in the way he matched his style to his subjects. For the 'Nativity Ode' and commendatory poem on Shakespeare he deployed Baroque conceits, while his two poems on the carrier Thomas Hobson were a succession of high-spirited paradoxes. What was then titled "An Epitaph on the Admirable Dramaticke Poet, W. Shakespeare" was included anonymously among the poems prefacing the second folio publication of Shakespeare's plays in 1632. The poems on Thomas Hobson were anthologised in collections titled A Banquet of Jests (1640, reprinted 1657) and Wit Restor’d (1685), bracketing both the 1645 and 1673 poetry collections published during Milton's lifetime.

The start of John Dryden's writing career coincided with the period when Cleveland, Cowley and Marvell were first breaking into publication. He had yet to enter university when he contributed a poem on the death of Henry Lord Hastings to the many other tributes published in Lachrymae Musarum (1649). It is typified by astronomical imagery, paradox, Baroque hyperbole, play with learned vocabulary ("an universal metampsychosis"), and irregular versification which includes frequent enjambment. The poem has been cited as manifesting "the extremes of the metaphysical style", but in this it sits well with others there that are like it: John Denham's "Elegy on the death of Henry Lord Hastings", for example, or Marvell's rather smoother "Upon the death of the Lord Hastings". The several correspondences among the poems there are sometimes explained as the result of the book's making a covert Royalist statement. In the political circumstances following the recent beheading of the king, it was wise to dissemble grief for him while mourning another under the obscure and closely wrought arguments typical of the Metaphysical style.

The choice of style by the young Milton and the young Dryden can therefore be explained in part as contextual. Both went on to develop radically different ways of writing; neither could be counted as potentially Metaphysical poets. Nor could Alexander Pope, yet his early poetry evidences an interest in his Metaphysical forebears. Among his juvenilia appear imitations of Cowley. As a young man he began work on adapting Donne's second satire, to which he had added the fourth satire too by 1735. Pope also wrote his "Elegy to the Memory of an Unfortunate Lady" (1717) while still young, introducing into it a string of Metaphysical conceits in the lines beginning "Most souls, 'tis true, but peep out once an age" which in part echo a passage from Donne's "Second Anniversary". By the time Pope wrote this, the vogue for the Metaphysical style was over and a new orthodoxy had taken its place, of which the rewriting of Donne's satires was one expression. Nevertheless, Johnson's dismissal of the 'school' was still in the future and at the start of the 18th century allusions to their work struck an answering chord in readers.

== Notes and references ==
=== Bibliography ===
- A. Alvarez, The School of Donne, London 1961
- "Elegies upon the Author" in Poems by J.D. with elegies of the author’s death, London 1633
- Gardner, Helen, The Metaphysical Poets. (Harmondsworth: Penguin, 1957)
- Grierson, Herbert J.C., Metaphysical Lyrics & Poems of the Seventeenth Century, Oxford, 1921
- Johnson, Samuel: "The Life of Cowley" extracted from Lives of the Poets (London 1780)
- Segel, Harold B., The Baroque Poem: a comparative survey, New York 1974
