= 1645 in poetry =

This article covers 1645 in poetry. Nationality words link to articles with information on the nation's poetry or literature (for instance, Irish or France).

== Works published ==
=== Great Britain ===
- Francis Quarles, Solomon's Recantation, entitled Ecclesiastes Paraphrased
- Sir Robert Stapylton, translator, Erotopagnion, translated from the original Latin of the Musaeus
- Edmund Waller, Poems
- George Wither, Vox Pacifica: A Voice Tending to the Pacification of God's Wrath

=== Other ===
- Adrián de Alesio, El Angélico ("The Angel"), dedicated to Saint Thomas Aquinas
- Sheikh Muhammad, Yoga-samgrama

== Works incorrectly dated this year ==
- John Milton, Poems of Mr John Milton, Both English and Latin, published 1646, according to The Concise Oxford Chronology of English Literature, notwithstanding the book's title page

== Births ==
Death years link to the corresponding "[year] in poetry" article:

- April 11 – Juan del Valle y Caviedes (died 1697), Spanish-born Peruvian poet and author

== Deaths ==
Birth years link to the corresponding "[year] in poetry" article:

- March 10 – William Strode (born c.1602), English poet
- April 3 (bur.) – Emilia Lanier, also spelled "Aemilia Lanyer" (born 1569), English
- July 7 – Georg Friedrich of Hohenlohe-Neuenstein-Weikersheim (born 1569), German officer and poet
- July 13 – Marie de Gournay, also known as Marie le Jars, demoiselle de Gournay (born c. 1566), French writer, author of feminist tracts and poet; a close associate of Michel de Montaigne; buried in the Saint-Eustache Church in Paris
- August 28 – Hugo Grotius (born 1583), Dutch jurist, philosopher, theologian, Christian apologist, playwright and poet
- August 31 – Francesco Bracciolini (born 1566), Italian
- September 8 – Francisco de Quevedo (born 1580), Spanish nobleman, politician and Golden Age poet
- William Browne (born 1590), English pastoral poet
- Feng Menglong (born 1574), Chinese writer and poet

== See also ==
- Poetry
- 17th century in poetry
- 17th century in literature
- Cavalier poets in England, who supported the monarch against the puritans in the English Civil War
