= Milton's 1645 Poems =

Poetry collection by John Milton

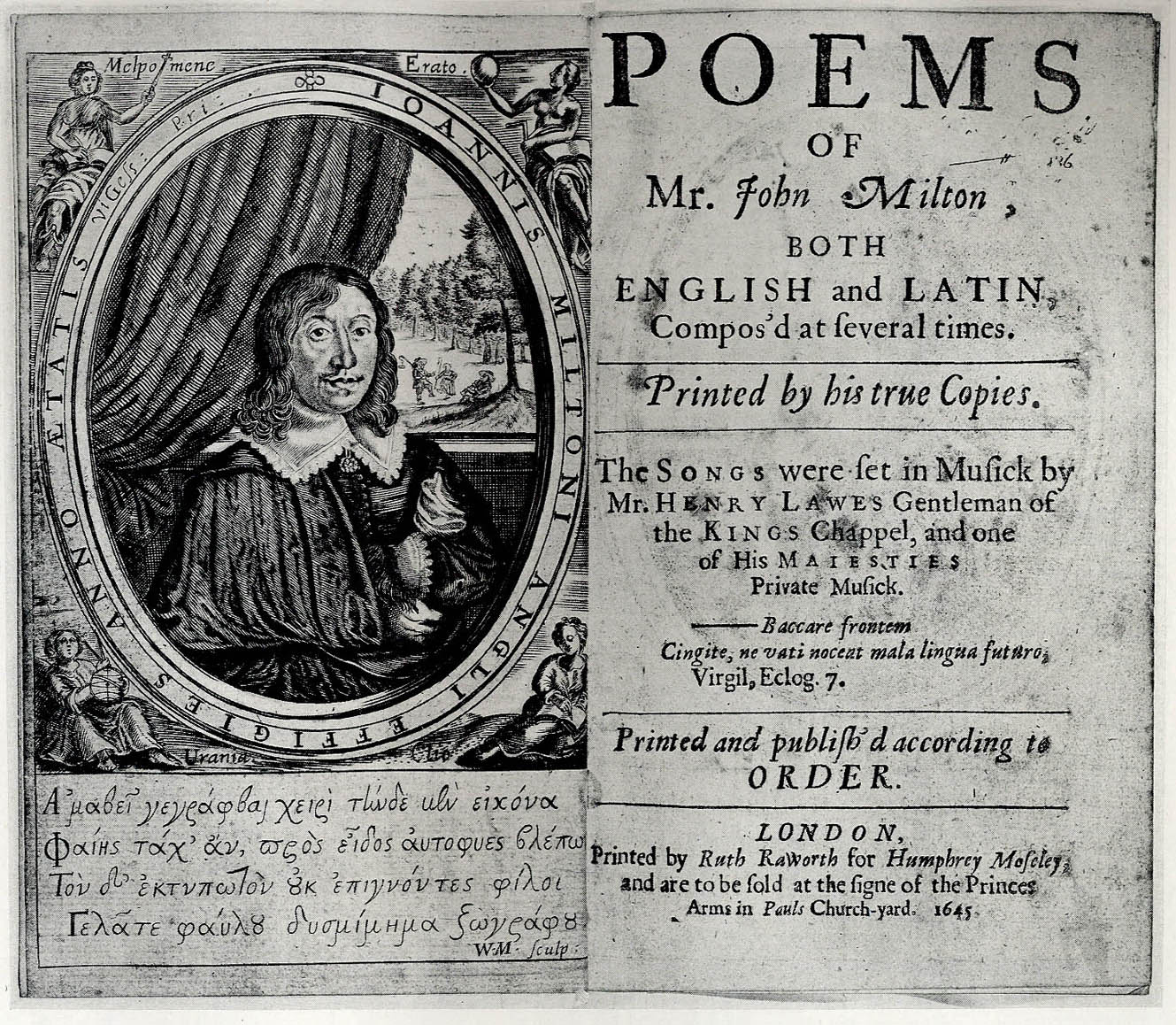
Titlepage to 1645 Poems, with frontispiece depicting Milton surrounded by four muses, designed by William Marshall

Milton's 1645 Poems is a collection, divided into separate English and Latin sections, of John Milton's youthful poetry in a variety of genres, including such notable works as An Ode on the Morning of Christ's Nativity, Comus and Lycidas. Appearing in late 1645 or 1646 (see 1646 in poetry), the octavo volume, whose full title is Poems of Mr. John Milton both English and Latin, compos'd at several times, was issued by the Royalist publisher Humphrey Moseley. In 1673, a year before his death, Milton issued a revised and expanded edition of the Poems.

According to The Concise Oxford Chronology of English Literature (2004), notwithstanding its title page, the book was published in 1646.

== Frontispiece ==
The volume's frontispiece contains an extremely unflattering portrait of Milton by the engraver William Marshall. Underneath the portrait are satirical verses in Greek denying any resemblance. It is assumed that this was a practical joke on Marshall, who is unlikely to have known that he was engraving insults directed at himself. The verses read in translation,

Looking at the form of the original, you could say, perhaps, that this likeness had been drawn by a rank beginner; but, my friends, since you do not recognize what is pictured here, have a chuckle at a caricature by a useless artist.

== Organization ==
In addition to the first titlepage, the volume contains separate titlepages for the Latin Poemata and Comus (a.k.a. A Mask). There are also five sonnets and a Canzone written in Italian language that are not separately denoted. The order of the English poems is as follows:

- On the Morning of Christ's Nativity
- A Paraphrase on Psalm 114
- Psalm 136
- The Passion
- On Time
- Upon the Circumcision
- At a Solemn Musick
- An Epitaph on the Marchioness of Winchester
- Song on May Morning
- On Shakespeare
- On the University Carrier [Hobson's Epitaph]
- Another on the same
- L'Allegro
- Il Penseroso
- Sonnets 1–10
- Arcades
- Lycidas
- A Mask [Comus]

The Latin poems are divided into "Elegiarum" (Elegies) and "Sylvarum Liber", and conclude with the Epitaphium Damonis, a poem mourning the death of Milton's best friend, Charles Diodati. In terms of themes and organization, this section "balances and speaks to the English collection".

== 1673 edition ==
Milton's 1673 Poems, formally titled Poems etc. on several occasions by Mr John Milton, both English and Latin, composed at several times, etc., also includes a tract on education. The facsimile of the title page shows that the book was published by Thomas Dring of London.

The 1673 book includes all the poems in Milton's 1645 Poems, though not the prefatory material. In addition it includes a few poems written before 1645 but not published in the earlier book, and a number of poems written after 1645. The tract on education is the same as in the 1645 book (Revard, 2009, p. 284ff).

According to the list published by Dartmouth College, poems included in the 1673 book but not in the 1645 book are:

- On the Death of a Fair Infant Dying of a Cough
- Sonnets
- The Fifth Ode of Horace. Book 1
- At a Vacation Exercise
- On the New Forcers of Conscience
- Psalm Translations
- Apologus de Rustico & Hero
- In Effigiei Ejus Sculptorem
- Ad Joannem Roüsium

The sonnets included are usually referred to as numbers 11, 12, 13, 14, 18, 19, 20, 21 and 23, according to the numbering Milton gave them in his autograph notebook referred to as the "Trinity Manuscript" (see Revard, 2009, p. 543), from its location in the Wren Library of Trinity College, Cambridge. In the printed edition, however, they are numbered sequentially. Thus, for example, the famous sonnet that begins When I Consider How My Light is Spent, usually (though inauthentically) referred to as On his blindness, is numbered 19 by Milton but 16 in the printed edition (see Revard, 2009, p. 569).

== Significance ==
Though many of these poems are marvels in their own right, critics are divided on how to read the volume as a whole in the scope of Milton's entire poetic career, which is invariably seen as culminating in the epic poem Paradise Lost. Taking a quote from Vergil's Georgics, Milton identifies himself as a "future poet" on the title page. Some commentators take this as evidence that Milton was self-consciously preparing himself for a greater work. Others, on the other hand, argue that Milton's self-presentation is of "a plural and shifting subject" whose poetic trajectory is not set in stone.

George Steiner stresses the mix of antique and modern; of English, Latin and Italian with knowledge of Hebrew and Greek: according to Steiner, Milton manages to unify the European community in its diversity.

It is also debatable to what extent the volume embraces the republican politics Milton had begun to adopt by this time. Milton's publisher, Moseley, supported Royalist poets, such as Edmund Waller, and the volume contains praises of aristocrats and traditionally Royalist forms, like masque. Yet a strong argument can be made that Milton did subtly inscribe his radical Puritan politics in the Poems through such works as Lycidas.

== See also ==
- 1646 in poetry
