= The Passion (Milton) =

The Passion is an unfinished ode by John Milton that was possibly written in 1630 and was first published in 1645 or 1646 (see 1646 in poetry). The poem connects Christ's Crucifixion with his Incarnation. It is linked to two other poems of Milton: On the Morning of Christ's Nativity and Upon the Circumcision

== Background ==
The exact date of composition is unknown, but it is likely that Milton wrote the ode while attending Christ's College, Cambridge, and it is commonly dated to 1630. However, the ode, along with Upon the Circumcision and On the Morning of Christ's Nativity, were first published in 1645, and they are found within a manuscript that was not started before May 1634. They were composed during a time in which Milton became deeply concerned with Scripture but also one who still relies on myth. They were written during a time of experimentation in genre and subject for Milton. The poem was revised for the publication in the 1645 collection, but Milton found that he would be unable to finish the poem, leaving only three lines which emphasise his shortcomings at the time of writing the poem.

== Poem ==
"The Passion" deals with the Crucifixion of Jesus but first two stanzas discuss how the narrator can no longer discuss the happiness of Christ's nativity:

Wherewith the stage of air and earth did ring,
And joyous news of Heav'nly infant's birth
My muse with angels did divide to sing
...
For now to sorrow must I tune my song,
And set my harp to notes of saddest woe (lines 2–4, 8–9)

Although he is to introduce the Crucifixion, the third stanza emphasises the nature of Christ and the Incarnation.

He sov'reign priest, stopping his regal head
That dropped with odorous oil down his fair eyes,
Poor fleshly tabernacle entered (lines 15–17)

The fourth stanza continues to ignore the Crucifixion by discussing the poetic tone required for such a poem:

These latter scenes confine my roving verse,
To this horizon is my Phoebus bound,
His Godlike acts, and his temptations fierce;
...
Me softer airs befit, and softer strings
Of lute, or viol still, more apt for mournful things. (lines 22–24, 27–28)

The fifth stanza continues this focus and discusses the printing of an elegy:

My sorrows are too dark for day to know:
The leaves should all be black whereon I write,
And letters where my tears have washed a wannish white. (lines 33–35)

The emphasis on poetry is dropped for an emphasis on the soul of the narrator in Stanza VI:

My spirit some transporting cherub feels,
To bear me where the towers of Salem stood
...
There doth my soul in holy vision sit
In pensive trance, and anguish, and ecstatic fit. (lines 38–39, 41–42)

The moment of the Crucifixion passes as the poet focuses on himself, and the poem transitions discussing to Christ's sepulchral in Stanza VIII:

Mine eye hath found that sad sepulchral rock
That was the casket of Heav'n's richest store,
And here though grief my feeble hands uplock,
Yet on the softened quarry would I score
My plaining verse as lively as before
For sure so well instructed are my tears,
That they would fitly fall in ordered characters. (lines 43–49)

The final stanza ends with the poet focusing on his own sorrow:

Or Should I thence, hurried on viewless wing,
Take up a weeping on the mountains wild,
The gentle neighbourhood of grove and spring
Would soon unbosom all their echoes mild
And I (for grief is easily beguiled)
Might think th' infection of my sorrows loud
Had got a race of mourners on some pregnant cloud.

Attached to the 1645 publication of the poem are three lines which Milton wrote to state that the poem is incomplete and is abandoned because the poet was unable to deal with the Crucifixion as the subject matter:

This subject the author finding to be above the
years he had when he wrote it, and nothing
satisfied with what was begun, left it unfinished.

== Themes ==
The Passion with On the Morning of Christ's Nativity and Upon the Circumcision form a set of poems that celebrates important Christian events: Christ's birth, the feast of the Circumcision, and Good Friday. The topic of these poems places them within a genre of Christian literature popular during the 17th century and places Milton alongside poets like John Donne, Richard Crashaw, and George Herbert. However, Milton's poetry reflects the origins of his anti-William Laud and anti-Church of England-based religious beliefs. The topic of The Passion is of Christ's Crucifixion. Although Milton was a Christian poet, he rarely discusses this event within his poetry.

In the poem, he ignores the suffering by diverting attention to a discussion of himself and his own understanding of poetry in a similar way to Donne's "Goodfriday, 1613. Riding Westward". Milton's emphasis is on the nature of Christian poetry, and Stanza V contains a self-referential discussion of writing elegiac poetry, which is a baroque technique similar to the work of Bernini or Herbert in "Good Friday". However, the narrator constantly focuses on himself and his own grief, and this is a common trait in the contemporary Christian poetry of the poem. Unlike many of his contemporaries' works, each aspect of the poem emphasises that the narrator is unable to actually discuss Christ's crucifixion, and the poem was left incomplete.

== Critical response ==
Thomas Corns believes that The Passion "offers a unique example of Milton's poetic engagement with a scene he evidently found difficult to depict". Corns also believes that lines 34 and 35 of the fifth stanza contain "the most memorable conceit, though one that has received some censure for its self-conscious preciosity".

== See also ==
- 1645 in poetry
