= L'Allegro =

Pastoral poem by John Milton

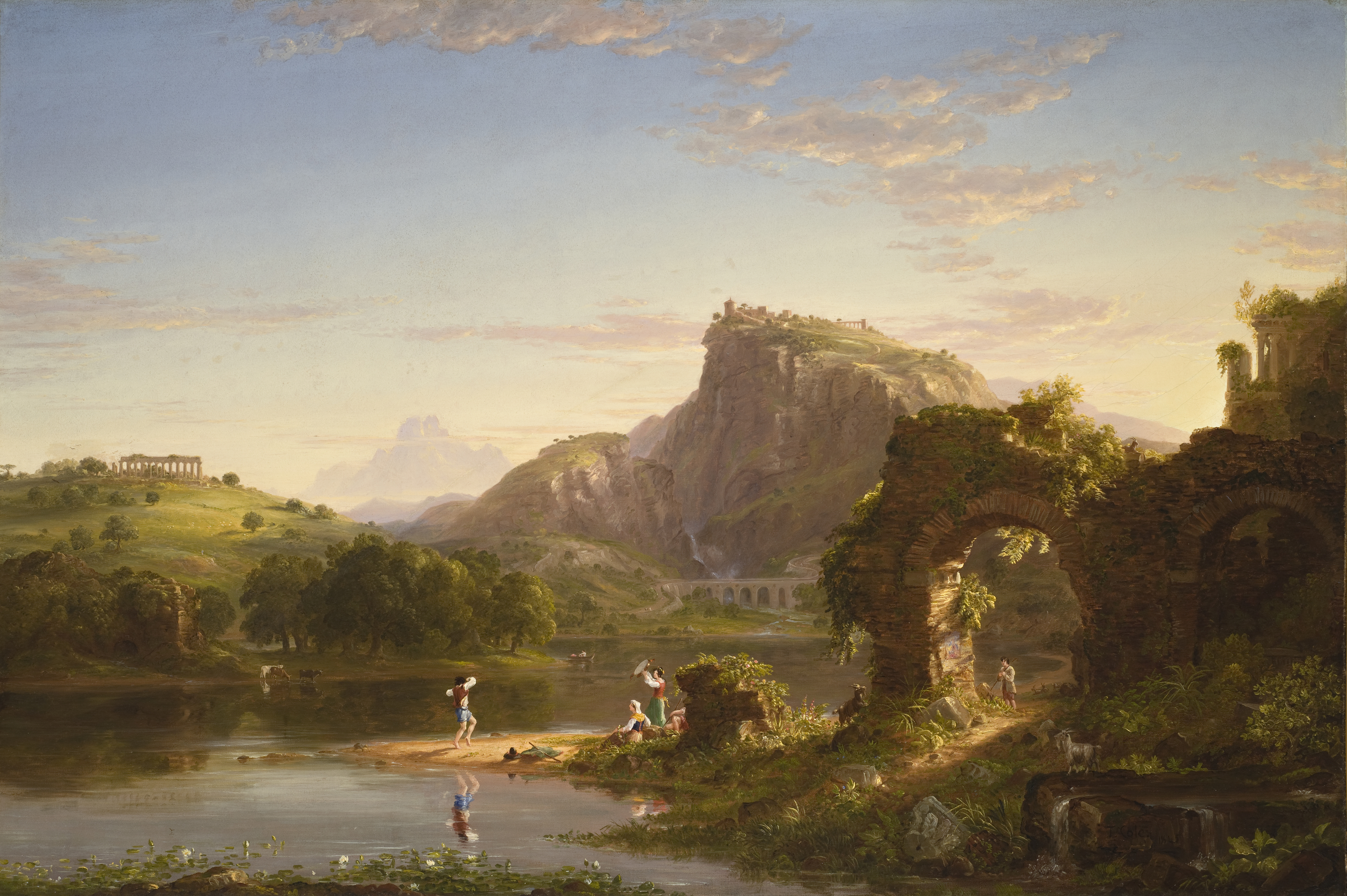
L'Allegro by Thomas Cole

L'Allegro is a pastoral poem by John Milton published in his 1645 Poems. L'Allegro (which means "the happy man" in Italian) has from its first appearance been paired with the contrasting pastoral poem, Il Penseroso ("the melancholy man"), which depicts a similar day spent in contemplation and thought.

== Background ==
It is uncertain when L'Allegro and Il Penseroso were composed because they do not appear in Milton's Trinity College manuscript of poetry. However, the settings found in the poem suggest that they were possibly composed shortly after Milton left Cambridge. The two poems were first published in Poems of Mr. John Milton both English and Latin, compos'd at several times dated 1645 but probably issued early in 1646. In the collection, they served as a balance to each other and to his Latin poems, including "Elegia 1" and "Elegia 6".

== Poem ==
Milton follows the traditional classical hymn model when the narrator invokes Mirth/Euphrosyne and her divine parentage:

In Heav'n yclept Euphrosyne,
And by men, heart-easing Mirth,
Whom lovely Venus at a birth
With two sister Graces more
To ivy-crowned Bacchus bore (lines 13–16)

The narrator continues by requesting Mirth to appear with:

Jest and youthful Jollity,
Quips and Cranks, and wanton Wiles,
Nods, and Becks, and wreathed Smiles,
...

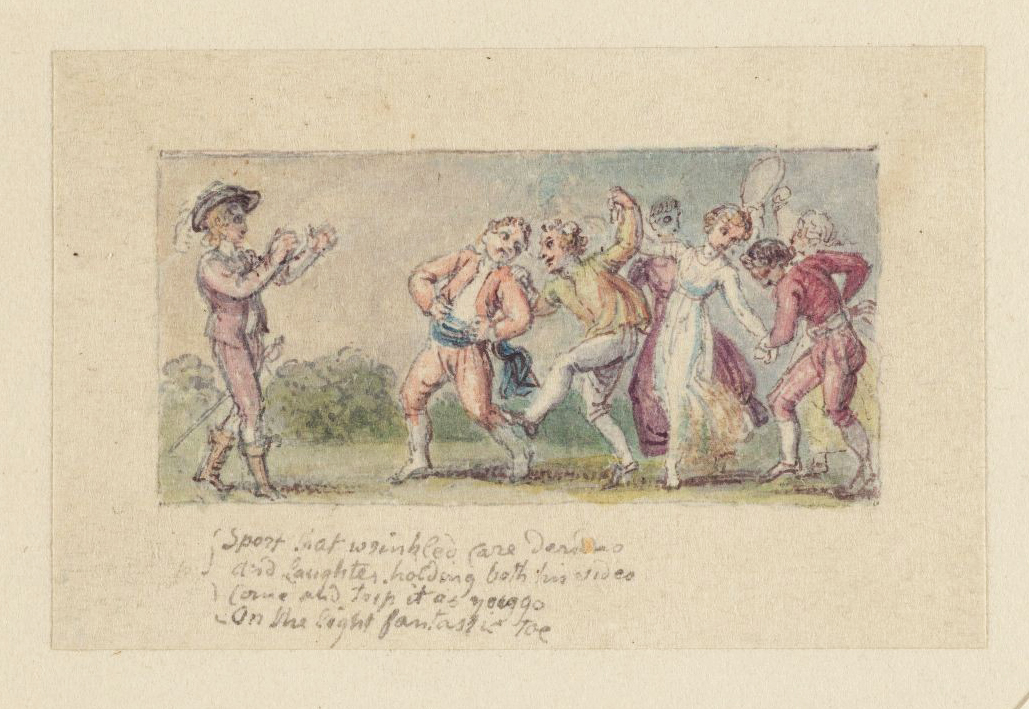
"Sport that wrinkled Care derides...", illustration by Thomas Stothard

Sport that wrinkled Care derides,
And Laughter holding both his sides. (lines 26–28, 31–32)

Later, the narrator describes how Mirth is connected to pastoral environments:

Whilst the landscape round it measures,
Russet lawns, and fallows grey,
Where the nibbling flocks do stray
...
Meadows trim with daisies pied,
Shallow brooks, and rivers wide (lines 70–72, 75–76)

Near the end of the poem, the narrator requests from Mirth to be immersed in the poetry and the pleasures that Mirth is able to produce:

And ever against eating cares,
Lap me in soft Lydian airs,
Married to immortal verse
Such as the meeting soul may pierce (lines 135–138)

The final lines of the poem frame a response to questions posed in Elizabethan poetry, including Christopher Marlowe's "Come live with me and be my love":

These delights, if thou canst give,
Mirth with thee, I mean to live. (lines 151–152)

== Themes ==
According to Barbara Lewalski, L'Allegro, along with Il Penseroso, "explore and contrast in generic terms the ideal pleasures appropriate to contrasting lifestyles... that a poet might choose, or might choose at different times, or in sequence". In particular, L'Allegro celebrates Grace Euphrosyne through the traditional Theocritan pastoral model. The poem is playful and is set within a pastoral scene that allows the main character to connect with folk stories and fairy tales in addition to various comedic plays and performances. There is a sort of progression from the pleasures found in L'Allegro with the pleasures found within Il Penseroso. Besides being set in a traditional form, there is no poetic antecedent for Milton's pairing.

The poem invokes Mirth and other allegorical figures of joy and merriment, and extols the active and cheerful life, while depicting a day in the countryside according to this philosophy. Mirth, as one of the Graces, is connected with poetry within Renaissance literature, and the poem, in its form and content, is similar to dithyrambs to Bacchus or hymns to Venus. However, the pleasure that Mirth brings is moderated, and there is a delicate balance between the influence of Venus or Bacchus achieved by relying on their daughter.

The poems have been classified in various traditions and genres by various scholars, including: as academic writing by E. M. W. Tillyard; as pastoral by Sara Watson; as part of classical philosophy by Maren-Sofie Rostvig; as part of Renaissance encomia by S. P. Woodhouse and Douglas Bush, and as similar to Homeric hymns and Pindaric odes. Stelle Revard believes that the poems follow the classical hymn model which discuss goddess that are connected to poetry and uses these females to replace Apollo completely.

== Critical reception ==
During the eighteenth century, both L'Allegro and Il Penseroso were popular and were widely imitated by poets. The poet and engraver William Blake, who was deeply influenced by Milton's poetry and personality, made illustrations to both L'Allegro and Il Penseroso.

Revard believes that Milton, in his first publication of poems, "takes care to showcase himself as a poet in these first and last selections and at the same time to build his poetic reputation along the way by skillful positioning of poems such as 'L'Allegro' and 'Il Penseroso.'"

Handel's L'Allegro, il Penseroso ed il Moderato (1740) is based partly on this poem.

Charles Villiers Stanford's 5th Symphony is titled L'Allegro et Il Pensieroso after the two poems of Milton.

Washington Irving's story The Legend of Sleepy Hollow makes reference to L'Allegro. When humorously describing Ichabod Crane's habit of singing psalms while walking at night, Irving writes that the residents of Sleepy Hollow "were often filled with awe at hearing his nasal melody, 'in linked sweetness long drawn out'", quoting line 140 of the Milton poem.

== See also ==
- 1645 in poetry

== General references ==
- Havens, Raymond. The Influence of Milton on English Poetry. New York: Russell & Russell, 1961.
- Kerrigan, William; Rumrich, John; and Fallon, Stephen (eds.) The Complete Poetry and Essential Prose of John Milton. New York: The Modern Library, 2007.
- Lewalski, Barbara. "Genre" in A Companion to Milton. Ed. Thomas Corns. Oxford: Blackwell Publishing, 2003.
- Osgood, Charles. The Classical Mythology of Milton's English Poems. New York: Holt, 1900.
- Revard, Stella. Milton and the Tangles of Neaera's Hair. Columbia: University of Missouri Press, 1997.
- Røstvig, Maren-Sofie. The Happy Man: Studies in the Metamorphosis of a Classical Idea, 1600–1700. Oslo: Oslo University Press, 1962.
- Tillyard, E. M. W. "Milton: 'L'Allegro' and 'Il Penseroso' in The Miltonic Setting, Past and Present. Cambridge: Cambridge University Press, 1938.
- Watson, Sara. "Milton's Ideal Day: Its Development as a Pastoral Theme". PMLA 57 (1942): 404–420.
- Woodhouse, A. S. P. and Bush, Douglas. Variorum: The Minor English Poems Vol 2. New York: Columbia University Press, 1972.
