= When I Consider How My Light Is Spent =

1673 poem by John Milton

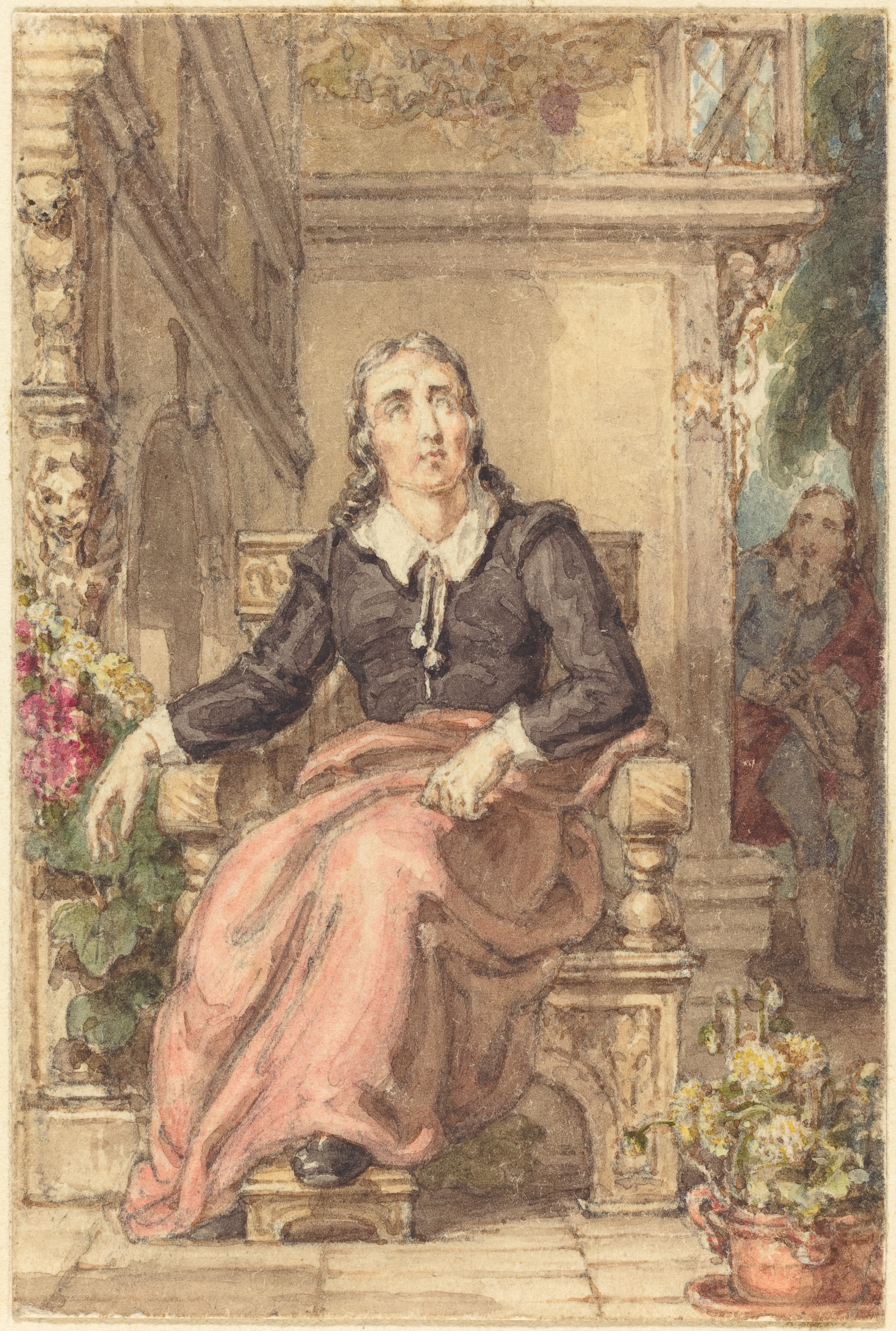
The Blind Milton (Thomas Uwins, c. 1817)

"When I Consider How My Light is Spent" (also known as "On His Blindness") is one of the best known of the sonnets of John Milton (1608–1674). The last three lines are particularly well known; they conclude with "They also serve who only stand and wait", which is much quoted though rarely in context. Variants of it have been used as mottos in a number of contexts, for example the Dickin Medal for service animals bears the motto "We also serve", and the Navy Wives Clubs of America uses the motto "They Also Serve, Who Stay and Wait". In U.S. popular culture it is perhaps best known through its use by Hall of Fame baseball broadcaster Vin Scully, who would quote it when showing a player not in the game.

The sonnet was first published in Milton's 1673 Poems in his autograph notebook, known as the "Trinity Manuscript" from its location in the Wren Library of Trinity College, Cambridge. He gave it the number 19, but in the published book it was numbered 16, so both numbers are used for it. It is popularly given the title On His Blindness, but there is no evidence that Milton used this title; it was assigned a century later by Thomas Newton in his 1761 edition of Milton's poetry, as was commonly done at the time by editors of posthumous collections.

It is always assumed that the poem was written after the publication of Milton's 1645 Poems. It may have been written as early as 1652, although most scholars believe that it was composed sometime between June and October 1655, when Milton's blindness was essentially complete. However, most discussions of the dating depend on the assumption that Newton's title reflects Milton's intentions, which may not be true. More reliable evidence of the date of the poem comes from the fact that it appears in the "Trinity Manuscript", which is believed to contain material written between about 1631 and 1659 and that it is not written in Milton's own handwriting, but that of a scribe who also wrote out several other of the sonnets to which Milton assigned higher numbers.

Haskin discusses some of the likely interpretative errors that readers have made as a result of assuming that the common title of the poem is authentic. For example, the "one talent" that Milton mourns his inability to use is not necessarily his poetic ability; it might as easily be his ability to translate texts from foreign languages, the task for which he was responsible in the Commonwealth government. However, the references to light and darkness in the poem make it virtually certain that Milton's blindness was at least a secondary theme.

The sonnet is in the Petrarchan form, with the rhyme scheme a b b a a b b a c d e c d e but adheres to the Miltonic conception of the form, with a greater usage of enjambment.

== Text ==
When I consider how my light is spent,
Ere half my days, in this dark world and wide,
And that one Talent which is death to hide
Lodged with me useless, though my Soul more bent
To serve therewith my Maker, and present
My true account, lest he returning chide,
“Doth God exact day-labour, light denied?”
I fondly ask. But patience, to prevent
That murmur, soon replies, “God doth not need
Either man’s work or his own gifts; who best
Bear his mild yoke, they serve him best. His state
Is Kingly: thousands at his bidding speed,
And post o’er land and ocean without rest;
They also serve who only stand and wait.”

== Meaning ==
When Milton writes "that one talent which is death to hide" he is specifically alluding to the parable of the talents in the Gospel of Matthew. The poem has undergone numerous translations into various languages. Examples include the 1970 Portuguese version “Sobre sua cegueira” by translators Péricles Eugênio da Silva Ramos and Paulo Vizioli; the 2022 Spanish rendition “Cuando mi luz ya considero muerta” by the Mexican poet Mario Murgia; and the 2025 Portuguese translation “Quando eu penso em como em mim a luz se esgota” by the Brazilian scholar Ricardo Sobreira.

== Figures ==
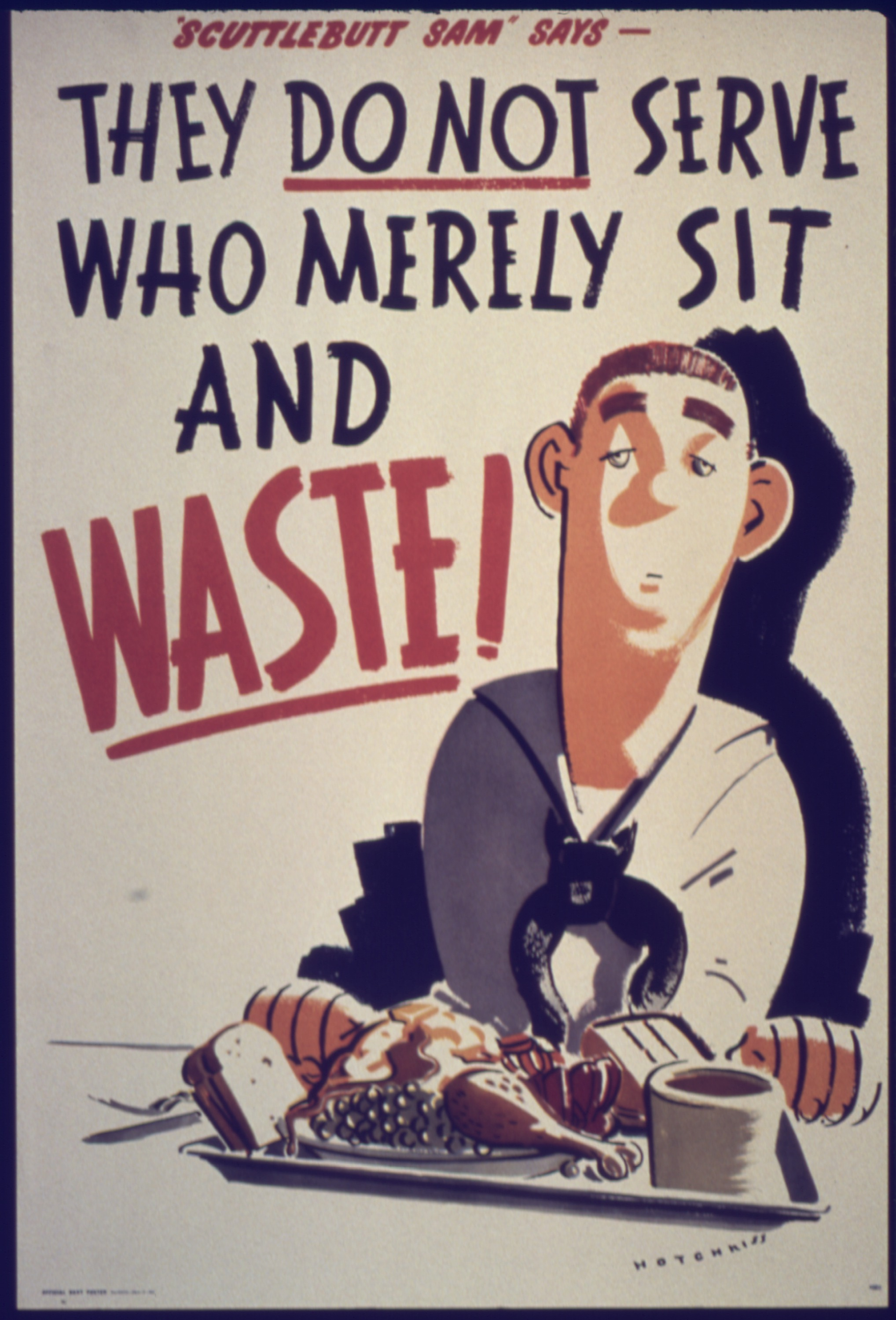
A 1940s US Navy propaganda poster referencing the poem's last line
