= Thomas Newton =

English cleric, biblical scholar and author

The Right Reverend Thomas Newton
- Bishop of Bristol
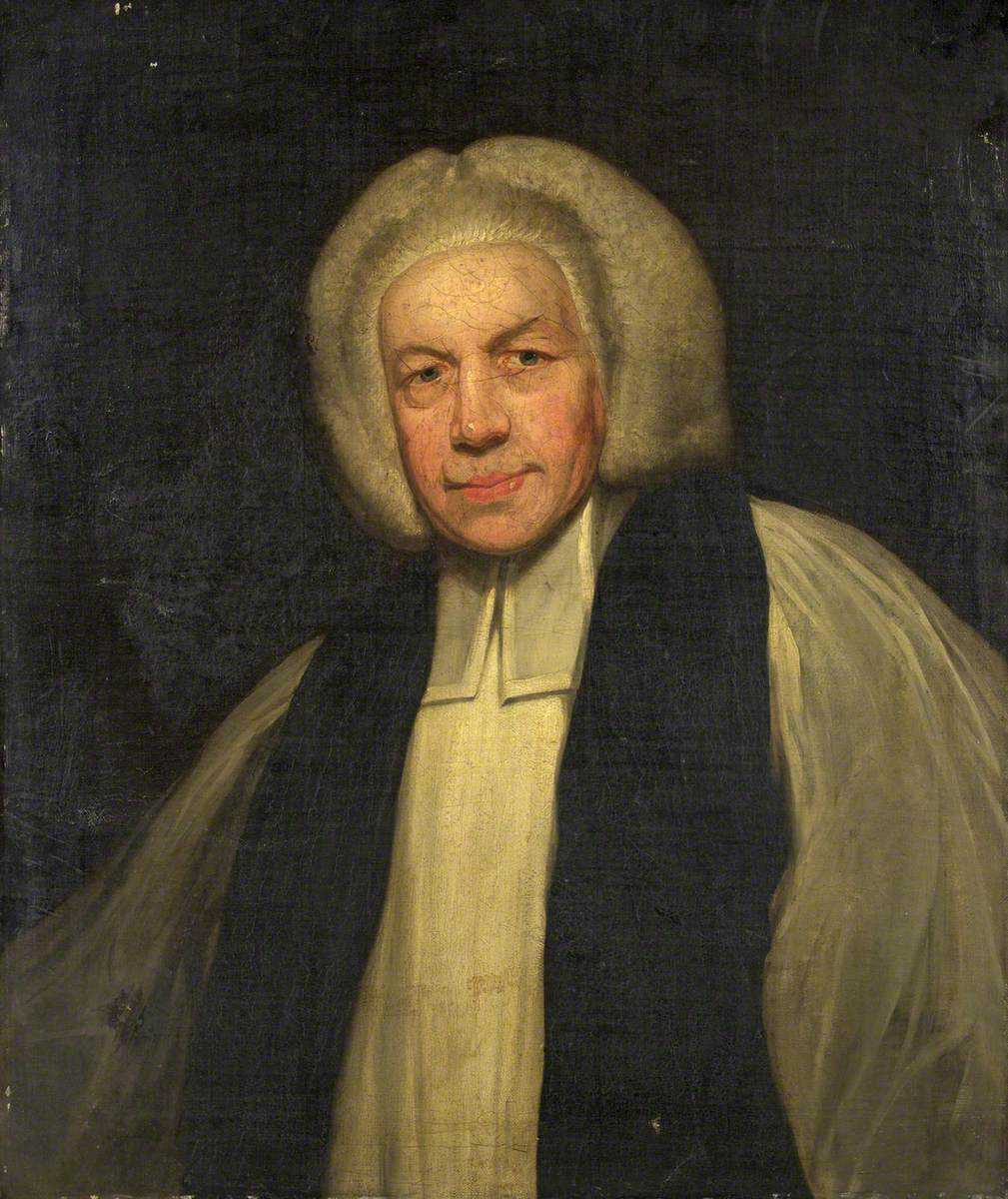
- Diocese: Diocese of Bristol
- In office: 21 December 1761 (election confirmed)–1782 (died)
- Predecessor: Philip Yonge
- Successor: Lewis Bagot
- Other posts: Canon Precentor of York Minster (Driffield prebend, 16 June 1759–11 February 1761); Canon of Westminster (22 March 1757–1761); Canon of St Paul's (Portpool prebend, 20 November 1761–1782); Dean of St Paul's (8 October 1768–1782)

Personal details
- Born: 1 January 1704 Lichfield, Staffordshire, England
- Died: 14 February 1782 (aged 78) City of London
- Buried: St Paul's Cathedral
- Denomination: Anglican
- Residence: The Old Deanery, London (at death)
- Parents: John Newton & Isabel née Rhodes
- Spouse: 1. Jane Trebeck (m. 18 August 1747; she died 1754); 2. Elizabeth née Vaughan (m. 5 September 1761; widowed 1782)
- Education: Trinity College, Cambridge

Ordination history of Thomas Newton
History
Diaconal ordination
- Ordained by: Edmund Gibson, Bishop of London
- Date: 21 December 1729
Priestly ordination
- Ordained by: Gibson
- Date: 22 February 1730
Episcopal consecration
- Consecrated by: Bishops of London, Winchester, Salisbury & Rochester
- Date: 28 December 1761
- Place: Lambeth Palace chapel

Thomas Newton (1 January 1704 – 14 February 1782) was an English cleric, biblical scholar and author. He served as the Bishop of Bristol from 1761 to 1782.

== Biography ==
Newton was educated at Trinity College, Cambridge and was subsequently elected a fellow of Trinity. He was ordained in the Church of England and continued scholarly pursuits. His more remembered works include his annotated edition of Paradise Lost, including a biography of John Milton, published in 1749. In 1754 he published a large scholarly analysis of the prophecies of the Bible, titled Dissertations on the Prophecies. In his 1761 edition of Milton's poetry, he gave the title On His Blindness to Sonnet XIX, When I Consider How My Light is Spent.

Newton was appointed the Bishop of Bristol in 1761 and in 1768 became the Dean of St Paul's Cathedral in London. He has been considered a Christian universalist.

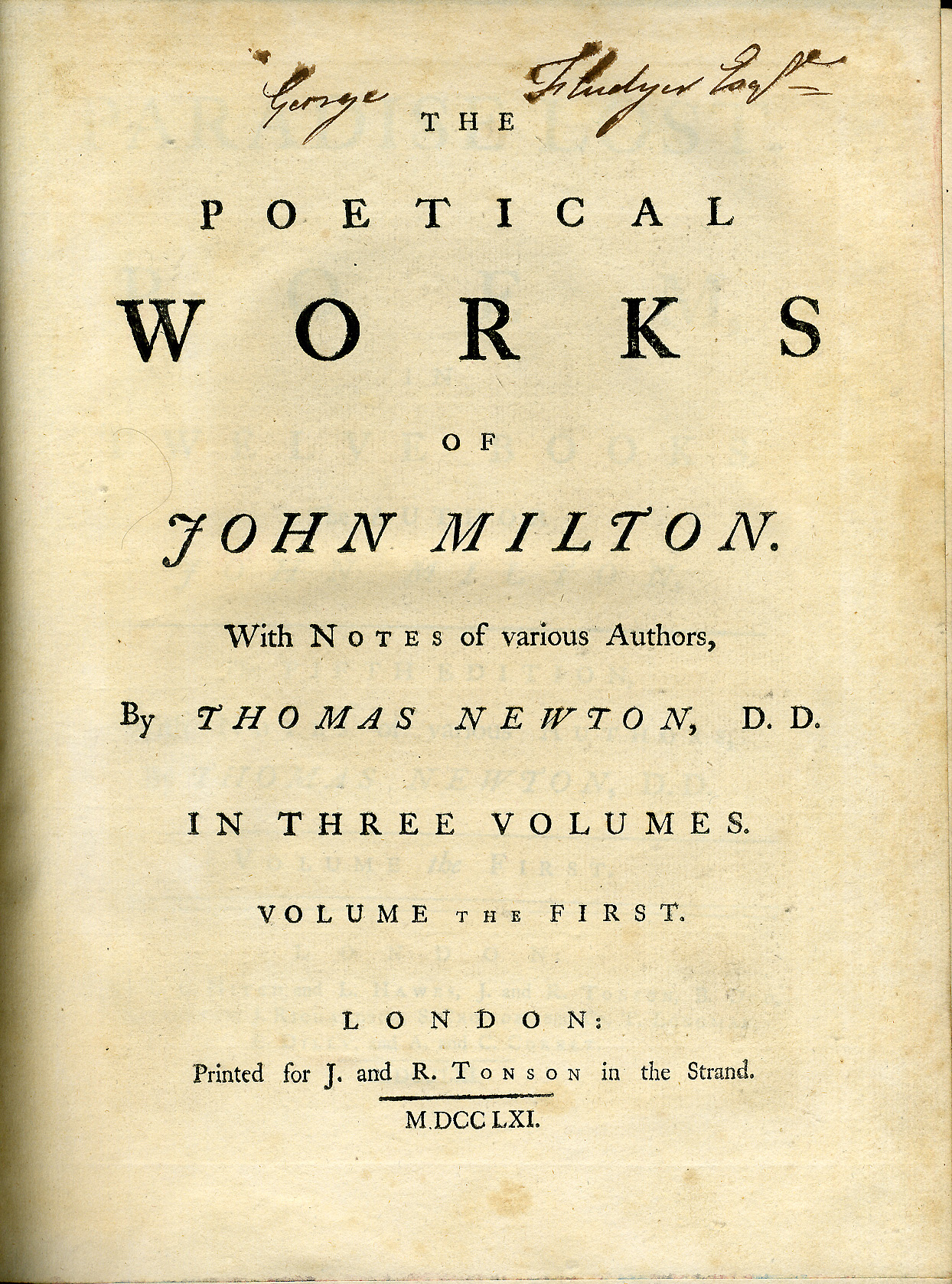
Titlepage of a 1752-1761 edition of Newton's extensively annotated works of John Milton, particularly Paradise Lost and Paradise Regained.

One of Newton's famous quotes concerns the Jewish people:

The preservation of the Jews is really one of the most signal and illustrious acts of divine Providence... and what but a supernatural power could have preserved them in such a manner as none other nation upon earth hath been preserved. Nor is the providence of God less remarkable in the destruction of their enemies, than in their preservation... We see that the great empires, which in their turn subdued and oppressed the people of God, are all come to ruin... And if such hath been the fatal end of the enemies and oppressors of the Jews, let it serve as a warning to all those, who at any time or upon any occasion are for raising a clamor and persecution against them.

== Sources ==
- Nigel Aston, ‘Newton, Thomas (1704–1782)’, Oxford Dictionary of National Biography, Oxford University Press, 2004, accessed 26 Aug 2008
- "Newton, Thomas (1729–1782)". The Clergy of the Church of England Database 1540–1835. CCEd Person ID 109210.

Church of England titles
Preceded by Philip Yonge	Bishop of Bristol; 1761–1782	Succeeded by Lewis Bagot
Preceded by Frederick Cornwallis	Dean of St Paul's; 1768–1782	Succeeded by Thomas Thurlow
