= 1673 in poetry =

This article covers 1673 in poetry. Nationality words link to articles with information on the nation's poetry or literature (for instance, Irish or France).

== Works published ==
- Sir William Davenant, The Works of Sr William D'Avenant, prose and poetry
- John Milton, Poems, &. Upon Several Occasions, second edition, revised and expanded, of Poems 1646

== Births ==
Death years link to the corresponding "[year] in poetry" article:

- Probable date - John Oldmixon (died 1742), English historian, pamphleteer, poet and critic
- Latest likely date - Pierre des Maizeaux (died 1745), French writer and poet

== Deaths ==
Birth years link to the corresponding "[year] in poetry" article:

- February 17 - Molière (born 1622), French playwright, poet and actor
- March 15 - Salvator Rosa (born 1615), Italian painter and poet
- May 4 - Richard Braithwait (born 1588), English
- May 9 - Jacques Vallée, Sieur Des Barreaux (born 1599), French
- May 19 - Ingen (born 1592), Chinese Linji Chan Buddhist monk, poet and calligrapher
- November 16 - Katarina Zrinska (born 1625), Croatian noblewoman and poet
- December 15 - Margaret Cavendish, Duchess of Newcastle-upon-Tyne (born 1623), English noblewoman, poet and writer
- Alaol (born 1607), Bengali poet
- Xiao Yuncong (born 1596), Chinese landscape painter, calligrapher and poet

== See also ==
- Poetry
- 17th century in poetry
- 17th century in literature
- Restoration literature
