= Ashley Riches =

British operatic baritone

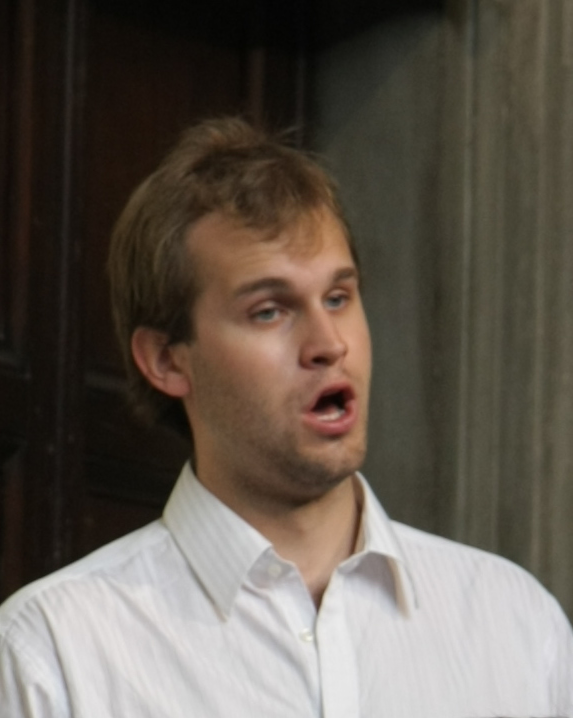
Ashley Riches in 2009

Ashley Riches is a British operatic baritone.

Riches studied at Winchester College and King's College, Cambridge, where he graduated in English and sang in King's College Choir under Stephen Cleobury. He continued his studies at the Guildhall School of Music and Drama, where he was a finalist for the Gold Medal.

From 2012 to 2014, Riches was a Jette Parker Young Artist at the Royal Opera House, Covent Garden. In his Royal Opera House main stage debut he sang a duet with Roberto Alagna in a gala concert.

Riches' lead roles with major opera companies have included Count Almaviva in Le nozze di Figaro by Mozart at English National Opera, the title role in Owen Wingrave by Britten for Opéra national de Lorraine, and Creon in Oedipus rex by Stravinsky with John Eliot Gardiner and the Berlin Philharmonic. Concert appearances have included the UK premiere of Shostakovich's Orango with Esa-Pekka Salonen and the Philharmonia Orchestra, and Bach's St Matthew Passion on a European tour with John Eliot Gardiner and the Monteverdi Choir. His solo recital appearances include the City of London Festival.

Riches was a BBC Radio 3 New Generation Artist from 2016 to 2018. He also performed in the 2019 BBC Promenade Concerts as Bernardino in Benvenuto Cellini by Berlioz.

== Discography ==
Riches' recordings include:

- Handel – L'Allegro, il Penseroso ed il Moderato (Signum, 2015), conducted by Paul McCreesh
- Duruflé – Requiem (King's College, Cambridge, 2016) conducted by Stephen Cleobury
- Sullivan – Songs (Chandos, 2017)
- J S Bach – St John Passion (Chandos, 2017), conducted by David Temple
- Kate Whitley – I Am I Say (NMC, 2017), conducted by Christopher Stark
- Bernstein – Wonderful Town (LSO, 2018), conducted by Sir Simon Rattle
- Purcell – King Arthur (Signum, 2019), conducted by Paul McCreesh
- Purcell – The Fairy Queen (Chandos, 2020), conducted by Paul McCreesh
- Songs by Sir Arthur Sullivan (Chandos, 2021)
- Proud Songsters – English Solo Song (King's College, Cambridge, 2021)
- A Musical Zoo (Chandos, 2021)
