= L'Allegro, il Penseroso ed il Moderato =

Pastoral ode by George Frideric Handel

- Pastoral ode by George Frideric Handel
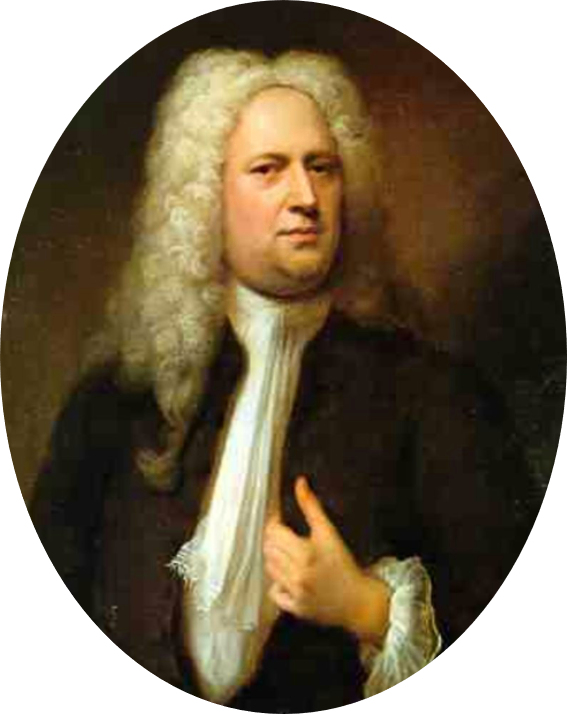
- Handel portrayed by Balthasar Denner, 1733
- English: The Cheerful, the Thoughtful, and the Moderate Man
- Catalogue: HWV 55
- Year: 1740
- Text: by James Harris
- Language: English
- Based on: John Milton's "L'Allegro" and "il Penseroso"
- Performed: 27 February 1740: London Lincoln's Inn Fields
- Movements: 46
- Scoring: 5 soloists; choir; orchestra

"Thus past the day, to bed they creep" (HWV 55)
Section performed by Les Arts Florissants

L'Allegro, il Penseroso ed il Moderato (The Cheerful Man, the Thoughtful Man and the Moderate Man), HWV 55, is a pastoral ode by George Frideric Handel based on the poetry of John Milton.

== History ==
Handel composed the work over the period of 19 January to 4 February 1740, and it was premiered on 27 February 1740 at the Royal Theatre of Lincoln's Inn Fields. At the urging of one of Handel's librettists, Charles Jennens, Milton's two poems, "L'Allegro" and "il Penseroso", were arranged by James Harris, interleaving them to create dramatic tension between the personified characters of Milton's poems (L'Allegro or the "Joyful man" and il Penseroso or the "Contemplative man"). The first two movements consist of this dramatic dialog between Milton's poems. In an attempt to unite the two poems into a singular "moral design", at Handel's request, Jennens added a new poem, "il Moderato", to create a third movement. The popular concluding aria and chorus, "As Steals the Morn" is adapted from Shakespeare's The Tempest, V.i.65–68.

Michael O'Connell and John Powell have published an analysis of Handel's setting of the text in his musical treatment.

== Dramatis Personae ==
- Soprano I
- Soprano II
- Alto (some versions only)
- Tenor
- Bass
- Chorus

There are no characters, no specific 'L'Allegro" or "Penseroso". The "drama" comes from alternating episodes representing the humors. Some versions give arias to different soloists. For instance, the "da capo" version of the aria "Straight mine eye hath caught new pleasures" is sung by a soprano (Gardiner, English Baroque Soloists, Monteverdi Choir, 1980) but the truncated recitative version is sung by a bass (Nelson, Ensemble Orchestra de Paris, 2000). Also, all soloists sing in the "il Moderato" section.

== Dance choreography ==
In 1988, Mark Morris choreographed a dance performance to accompany the music and poetry.

== Recordings ==
There are 11 complete recordings of the oratorio, although dependant on either the performing edition or directorial choices, some are cut to varying degrees:

- 1961 – Elsie Morison (soprano), Jacqueline Delman (soprano), Elizabeth Harwood (soprano), Helen Watts (contralto), Peter Pears (tenor), Hervey Alan (bass) – St. Anthony Singers, Philomusica of London, conducted by David Willcocks – 2 LPs/2 CDs L'Oiseau-Lyre. A very early recording, it was heavily cut (presumably due to the lack of an accurate critical performing edition). It was reissued in 1999 by Decca Records.
- 1981 – Michael Ginn (treble), Patrizia Kwella (soprano), Marie McLaughlin (soprano), Jennifer Smith (soprano), Maldwyn Davies (tenor), Martyn Hill (tenor), Stephen Varcoe (bass) – The Monteverdi Choir, English Baroque Soloists, conducted by John Eliot Gardiner – 2 LPs/2CDs Erato. This was the first attempt at recording the work, although it was not complete and consisted of some cut numbers.
- 1983 – Darija Hreljanović (soprano), Ivanka Boljkovac (soprano), Nada Ruždjak (soprano), Zrinko Sočo (tenor), Vladimir Ruždjak (baritone) – Zbor Hrvatske Radiotelevizije, Zagreb Radio Symphony Orchestra, conducted by Vladimir Kranjčević – 2 LPs Jugaton. This was a recording made by Jugaton, the Croatian (then Yugoslavian) state record label, and received no distribution in the West.
- 1986 – Nancy Armstrong (soprano), Sharon Baker (soprano), Mary Westbrook-Geha (mezzo-soprano), Frank Kelley (tenor), James Maddalena (baritone) – Banchetto Musicale, conducted by Martin Pearlman – 2 LPs/2 CDs Arabesque.
- 1989 – Věnceslava Hrubá-Freiberger (soprano), Dagmar Schellenberger (soprano), Jochen Kowalski (alto), Michael Rabsilber (tenor), Franz-Josef Kapellmann (baritone) – Rundfunkchor Berlin, Orchester der Komischen Oper Berlin, conducted by Rolf Reuter – 2 LPs/2 CDs Berlin Classics. Originally released on Eterna and distributed throughout the German Democratic Republic before the reissued CD set found wider distribution. It is sung in a German translation by the musicologist and Handel scholar Walther Siegmund-Schultze.
- 1999 – Susan Gritton (soprano), Lorna Anderson (soprano), Claron McFadden (soprano), Paul Agnew (tenor), Neal Davies (bass) – The King's Consort and Choir, conducted by Robert King – 2 CDs Hyperion. This was the first complete, uncut recording.
- 2000 – Christine Brandes (soprano), Lynne Dawson (soprano), David Daniels (countertenor), Ian Bostridge (tenor), Alastair Miles (bass) – The Bach Choir, Ensemble Orchestral de Paris, conducted by John Nelson – 2 CDs Virgin.
- 2002 – Barbara Hannigan (soprano), Linda Perillo (soprano), Knut Schoch (tenor), Stephan MacLeod (bass) – Junge Kantorei, Barockorchester Frankfurt, conducted by Joachim Carlos Martini – 2 CDs Naxos. This was a live recording from 19 May 2002, at Kloster Eberbach in Eltville.
- 2013 – Maria Keohane (soprano), Julia Doyle (soprano), Benjamin Hulett (tenor), Andreas Wolf (bass) – Kölner Kammerchor, Collegium Cartusianum, conducted by Peter Neumann – 2 CDs Carus.
- 2015 – Gillian Webster (soprano), Laurence Kilsby (treble), Jeremy Ovenden (tenor), Peter Harvey (baritone), Ashley Riches (bass) – The Gabrieli Players and Consort, conducted by Paul McCreesh – 2 CDs Winged Lion. This recording followed the earliest version of the work and adheres to the composer's own performance practice, namely inserting two of his Op. 6 concerti grossi – Nos. 1 and 3 – before the first and second parts, and the organ concerto, Op. 7 No. 1 before the third.
- 2023 – Rachel Redmond (soprano), Leo Jemison (treble), James Way (tenor), Sreten Manojlović (bass) – Les Arts Florissants, conducted by William Christie – 2 CDs Harmonia Mundi.
