= Upon the Circumcision =

Poem by John Milton

Upon the Circumcision is an ode by John Milton that was possibly written in 1633 and first published in 1645. It discusses the Feast of the Circumcision of Christ and connects Christ's Incarnation with his Crucifixion.

== Background ==
The exact date of composition is unknown, but it is possible that Milton wrote the ode while attending Christ's College, Cambridge, and it is commonly dated to 1633. However, the ode, along with The Passion (Milton) and On the Morning of Christ's Nativity, were first published in 1645, and they are found within a manuscript that was not started before May 1634. They were composed during a time in which Milton became deeply concerned with Scripture but also one who still relies on myth. They were written during a time of experimentation in genre and subject for Milton.

== Poem ==
Milton begins his poem by invoking the angels, and he claims that they too would need to cry along with mankind:

So sweetly sung your joy the clouds along
Through the soft silence of the list'ning night;
Now mourn, and if sad share with us to bear
Your fiery essence can distill no tear
Burn in your sighs, and borrow
Seas wept from our deep sorrow; (lines 4–9)

The final lines connect the act of Circumcision to Christ's Passion:

And that great cov'nant which we still transgress
Entirely satisfied,
And the full wrath beside
Of vengeful Justice bore for our excess,
And seals obedience first with wounding smart
This day: but O ere long
Huge pangs and strong
Will pierce more near his heart. (lines 21–28)

== Themes ==
Upon the Circumcision with The Passion and On the Morning of Christ's Nativity form a set of poems that celebrates important Christian events: Christ's birth, the feast of the Circumcision, and Good Friday. The topic of these poems places them within a genre of Christian literature popular during the 17th century and places Milton alongside of poets like John Donne, Richard Crashaw, and George Herbert. However, Milton's poetry reflects the origins of his anti-William Laud and anti-Church of England-based religious beliefs.

Although the other poems in the series tend to be commonplace in theme with Milton's contemporaries, the topic of Christ's Circumcision is rare. Of these poems, Herrick discusses the Circumcision as a somber moment during the festive Twelve Days of Christmas. Milton's poem is convention and Milton connects the Circumcision with Christ's Incarnation by describing the removal of flesh as linking Christ to his human identity. The poem's final moments, of linking the Circumcision with the Crucifixion, is a common theme within Circumcision poems, including the description in Cartwright's and Francis Quarles's poems. However, Milton's, unlike some others, fails to mention the Virgin Mary in relationship to the infant Jesus.
