= William Marshall (illustrator) =

British engraver and illustrator

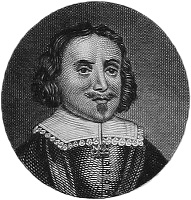
William Marshall

William Marshall (fl. 1617–1649) was a seventeenth-century British engraver and illustrator, mostly known for his allegorical portrait of King Charles I of England as a Christian martyr, which was published as the frontispiece to the Eikon Basilike.

== Early career ==
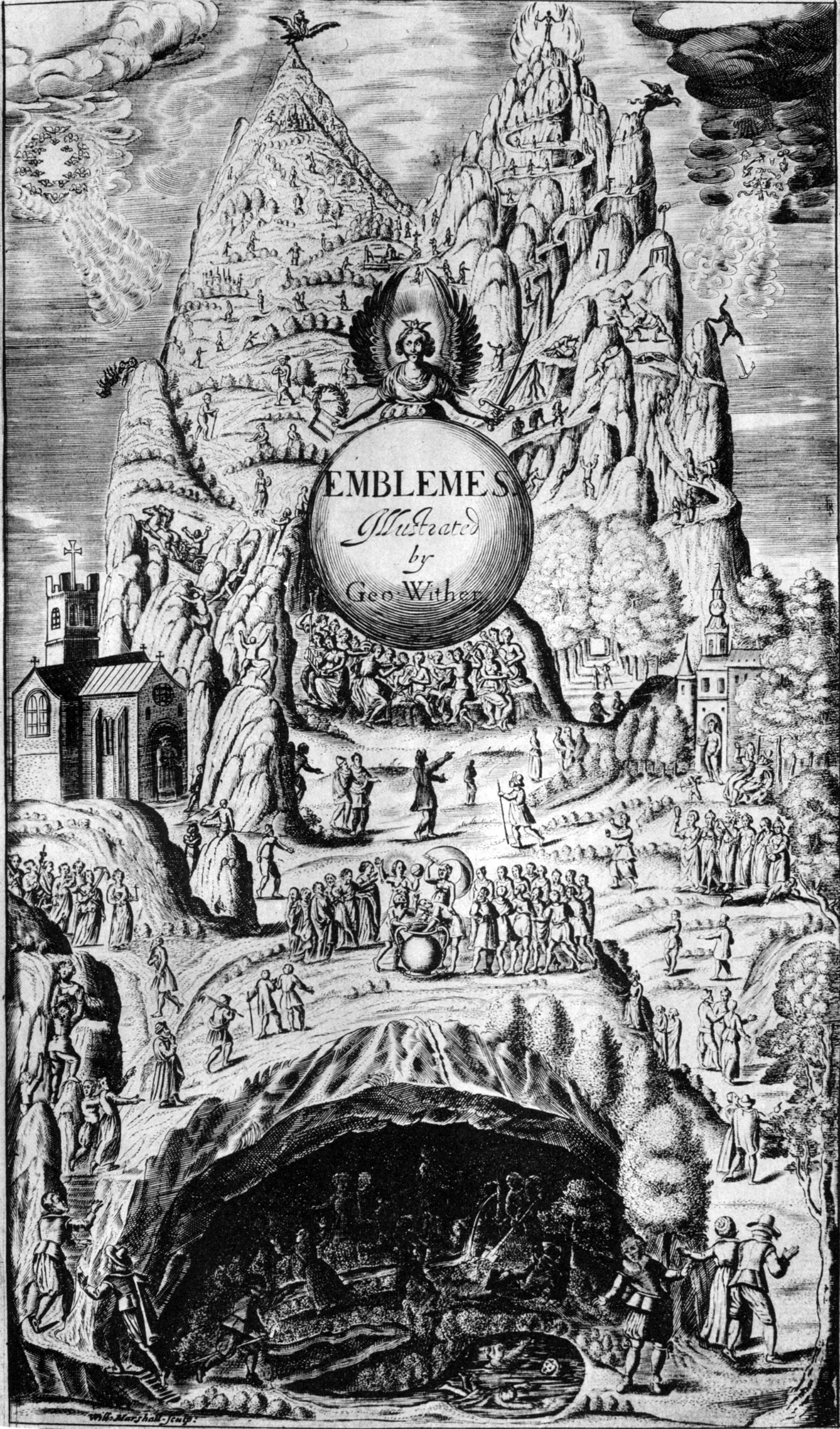
Marshall's frontispiece to Wither's Emblemes.

Nothing is known of Marshall's life beyond references to his career as an engraver. Marshall's earliest known work is the frontispiece to the book A Solemne Joviall Disposition Briefly Shadowing the Law of Drinking, which was published in 1617. In the 1630s he produced a number of portrait engravings and book frontispieces, depicting Puritan divines, poets, and figures associated with the High Church establishment of the day, such as William Laud.

His most ambitious work was the highly elaborate frontispiece to George Wither's 1635 Collection of Emblemes, Ancient and Moderne, an unusually complex example of the Emblem book. Wither left the design to Marshall, having given general instructions, but expressed himself exasperated with the result, on the grounds that its symbolism was thoroughly incoherent. As he wrote,

Instead thereof, the Workman brought to light,
What, here, you see; therein, mistaking quite
The true Design: And, so (with pains, and cost)
The first intended FRONTISPIECE, is lost.

Wither's lengthy poem on the engraving claims that its apparently inconsistent symbolism revealed, unintentionally, a deeper truth. The lower part of the frontispiece depicts people wandering in confusion in a cave, apparently having emerged from a womb-like pool in which babies are shown swimming. They exit the cave to draw lots given to them by the goddess of Fortune, symbolic of their allotted place in life. They then climb up a mountain, which divides into two peaks, symbolic of the right and the wrong paths in life. The path to the peak on the right appears more attractive at first, but then becomes rocky and finally leads only to death; the path on the left is at first harder, but eventually becomes pleasant and leads to paradise. A Christian church is depicted on the left and a Pagan temple on the right.

Marshall also created forty-one of the seventy-nine plates in Francis Quarles's Emblems of the life of man.

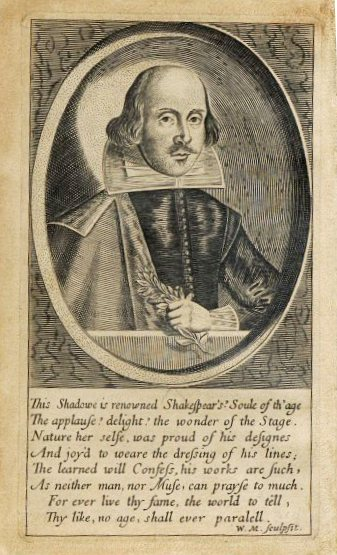
Marshall's image of Shakespeare for Benson's 1640 edition of his poems

In 1640 he created the image of William Shakespeare for John Benson's (notoriously inaccurate) edition of the poet's sonnets. This was an adapted and reversed version of the original Martin Droeshout print. Five years later, he created the image of John Milton surrounded by four muses for Milton's 1645 Poems. The muses are Melpomene (tragedy), Erato, (lyric poetry), Urania, (astronomy), and Clio (history). Like Wither, Milton was unimpressed by Marshall's work, considering the portrait to be deeply unflattering. He had Marshall engrave satirical verses written in Greek underneath the image. It is assumed that this was a practical joke on Marshall, who is unlikely to have known that he was engraving insults directed at himself. The verses read in translation,

Looking at the form of the original, you could say, perhaps, that this likeness had been drawn by a rank beginner; but, my friends, since you do not recognize what is pictured here, have a chuckle at a caricature by a useless artist.

== Eikon Basilike ==
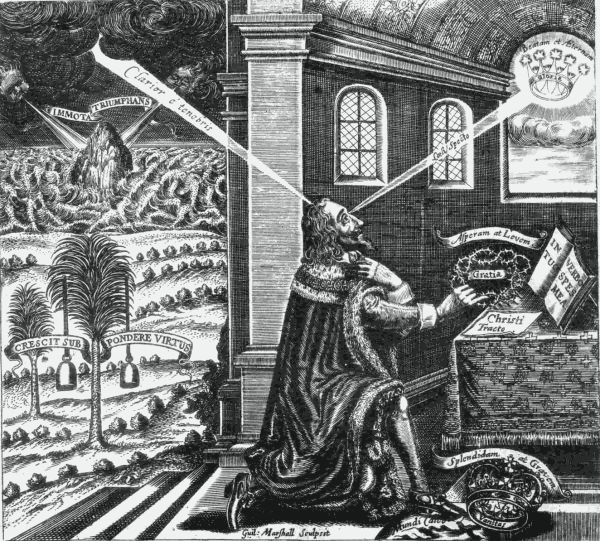
William Marshall's Eikon Basilike print

After the end of the English Civil War, when King Charles was put on trial and condemned to be executed, a book was published entitled Eikon Basilike (Greek: εἰκὼν βασιλική, the "Royal Portrait"), The Pourtrature of His Sacred Majestie in His Solitudes and Sufferings. It purported to be a spiritual autobiography written by the King. It was published on February 9, 1649, ten days after the King was beheaded by order of Parliament. Marshall created the image on the frontispiece, which employs symbolism derived from the Emblem Book tradition. This depicts the King as a Christian martyr. So popular was the book and the image that Marshall had to re-engrave the plate seven times.

The Latin texts read:

- IMMOTA, TRIVMPHANS — "Unmoved, Triumphant" (scroll around the rock);
- Clarior é tenebris — "Brighter through the darkness" (beam from the clouds);
- CRESCIT SUB PONDERE VIRTVS — "Virtue grows beneath weights" (scroll around the tree);
- Beatam & Æternam — "Blessed and Eternal" (around the heavenly crown marked GLORIA ("Glory")); meant to be contrasted with:
  - Splendidam & Gravem — "Splendid and Heavy" (around the Crown of England, removed from the King's head and lying on the ground), with the motto Vanitas ("vanity"); and
  - Asperam & Levem — "Bitter and Light", the martyr's crown of thorns held by Charles; contains the motto Gratia ("grace");
- Coeli Specto — "I look to Heaven";
- IN VERBO TVO SPES MEA — "In Thy Word is My Hope";
- Christi Tracto — "I entreat Christ" or "By the word of Christ";
- Mundi Calco — "I tread on the world".

In the first edition, the frontispiece was accompanied by Latin and English verses that explain it. The English verses go:

Tho' clogg'd with weighs of miseries
Palm-like Depress'd, I higher rise

And as th'unmoved Rock outbraues
The boist'rous Windes and raging waues
So triumph I. And shine more bright
In sad Affliction's darksom night.

That Splendid, but yet toilsom Crown
Regardlessly I trample down.

With joie I take this Crown of thorn
Though sharp, yet easie to be born.

That heavn'nlie Crown, already mine
I view with eies of Faith diuine.

I slight vaine things, and do embrace
Glorie, the just reward of Grace.

The landscape at the left contains the weighted palm tree and the rock buffeted by winds and waves, emblematic of the king's steadfastness. The beam of light from heaven passing through the king's eye illustrates his vision of his heavenly crown of martyrdom, while he picks up the crown of thorns and discards the earthly crown and worldly power (represented by the chart of the world on which he treads).

The Eikon Basilike and its portrait of Charles's execution as a martyrdom were so successful that, at the Restoration, a special commemoration of the King on 30 January was added to the Book of Common Prayer, directing that the day be observed as an occasion for fasting and repentance.

It is assumed that Marshall died in 1649, since there are no more references to him and the Eikon Basilke plate was reengraved for the eighth time that year by another engraver, Robert Vaughan.
