= Adrián de Alesio =

Peruvian painter and poet

Adrián de Alesio (also Adrián Alesio) (died 1650) was a Peruvian painter and poet.

== Biography ==
Alesio's date and place of birth are unknown, though he was probably born in Europe. His father, the Italian painter Matteo da Lecce, arrived in Lima in 1588 and married Mary Fuentes de la Cadena in 1598. Adrián de Alesio was a disciple of his father, and in his workshop developed as a poet with some success. Alesio is the author of the 1645 poem El Angélico ("The Angel"), dedicated to Saint Thomas Aquinas. Alesio is generally believed to have been a Dominican priest, though some historians have described him as a Mercedarian. After being admitted to the order, he continued as an artist, but there are no traces of his work in the monastic archives. He also illuminated some choir books of his convent.
