= Il Penseroso =

Poem by John Milton

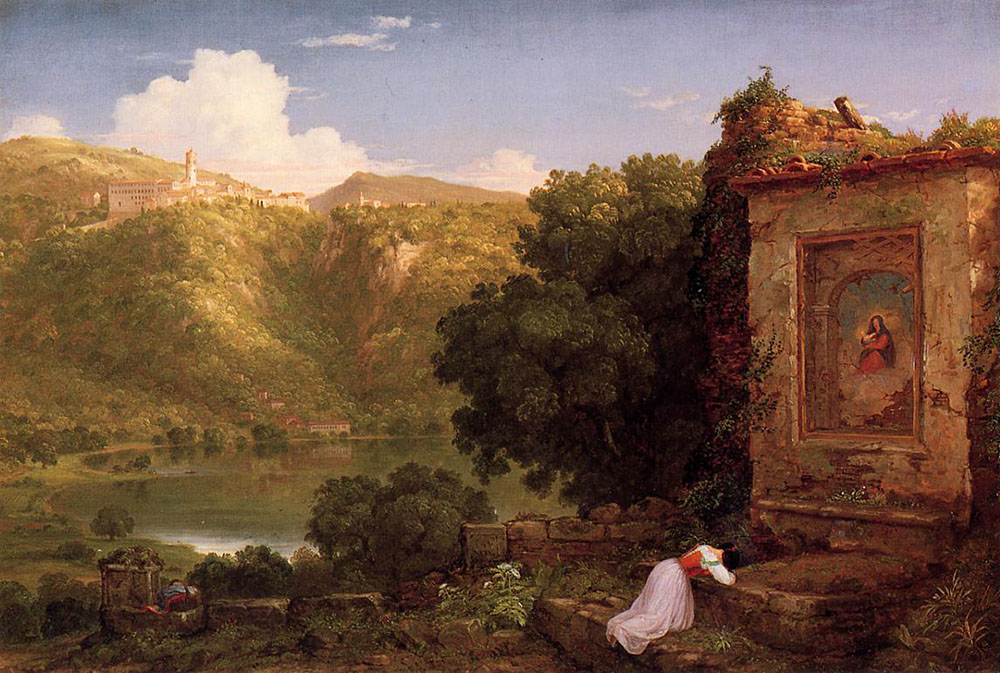
Il Penseroso by Thomas Cole

Il Penseroso ("the thinker") is a poem by John Milton, first found in the 1645/1646 quarto of verses The Poems of Mr. John Milton, both English and Latin, published by Humphrey Moseley. It was presented as a companion piece to L'Allegro, a vision of poetic mirth. The speaker of this reflective ode dispels "vain deluding Joys" from his mind in a ten-line prelude, before invoking "divinest Melancholy" to inspire his future verses. The melancholic mood is idealised by the speaker as a means by which to "attain / To something like prophetic strain," and for the central action of Il Penseroso – which, like L'Allegro, proceeds in couplets of iambic tetrameter – the speaker speculates about the poetic inspiration that would transpire if the imagined goddess of Melancholy he invokes were his Muse. The highly digressive style Milton employs in L'Allegro and Il Penseroso dually precludes any summary of the poems' dramatic action as it renders them interpretively ambiguous to critics. However, it can surely be said that the vision of poetic inspiration offered by the speaker of Il Penseroso is an allegorical exploration of a contemplative paradigm of poetic genre.

== Background ==
It is uncertain when L'Allegro and Il Penseroso were composed, as they do not appear in Milton's Trinity College manuscript of poetry. However, the settings found in the poem suggest that they were possibly composed ca. 1631 shortly after Milton left Cambridge in 1629.

== Poem ==
As prelude to his invocation of Melancholy, the speaker dismisses joy from his imagination. Its rhythm of alternate lines of iambic trimeter and iambic pentameter is identical to that of the first 10 lines of L'Allegro:

Hence vain deluding Joys,

The brood of folly without father bred,

How little you bested,

Or fill the fixed mind with all your toyes;

Dwell in som idle brain

And fancies fond with gaudy shapes possess,

As thick and numberless

As the gay motes that people the Sun Beams,

Or likest hovering dreams

The fickle Pensioners of Morpheus train.

— lines 1–10

The speaker invokes a Melancholy goddess, veiled in black:

But hail thou Goddess, sage and holy,

Hail divinest Melancholy

Whose Saintly visage is too bright

To hit the Sense of human sight;

And therefore to our weaker view,

O'er laid with black, staid Wisdoms hue.

— lines 11–16

... and, following the form of classical hymn, claims her heritage with the Roman pantheon:

Thee bright-haired Vesta long of yore,

To solitary Saturn bore;

His daughter she (in Saturn's reign,

Such mixture was not held a stain);

— lines 23–26

Having invoked the Melancholy goddess, the speaker imagines her ideal personification:

... pensive Nun, devout and pure,

Sober, stedfast, and demure,

All in a robe of darkest grain,

Flowing with majestick train,

And sable stole of Cipres Lawn,

Over thy decent shoulders drawn.

Com, but keep thy wonted state,

With eev'n step, and musing gate,

And looks commercing with the skies,

Thy rapt soul sitting in thine eyes:

There held in holy passion still,

Forget thy self to Marble, till

With a sad Leaden downward cast,

Thou fix them on the earth as fast.

— lines 31–44

The central action of the poem proceeds as poetic visions of Melancholy, imagined by the speaker:

Thee Chauntress oft the Woods among

I woo to hear thy even-Song;

And missing thee, I walk unseen

On the dry smooth-shaven Green,

To behold the wandring Moon,

Riding neer her highest noon,

Like one that had bin led astray

Through the Heav'ns wide pathles way;

— lines 63–70

... let my Lamp at midnight hour,

Be seen in some high lonely Tow'r,

Where I may oft out-watch the Bear,

With thrice great Hermes, or unsphear

The spirit of Plato to unfold

What Worlds, or what vast Regions hold

The immortal mind hath forsook

Her mansion in this fleshly nook:

And of those Daemons that are found

In fire, air, flood, or under ground...

— lines 85–95

And if ought else, great Bards beside,

In sage and solemn tunes have sung,

Of Turneys and of Trophies hung;

Of Forests, and inchantments drear,

Where more is meant then meets the ear.

Thus night oft see me in thy pale career,

Till civil-suited Morn appeer...

— lines 116-22

And when the Sun begins to fling

His flaring beams, me Goddess bring

To arched walks of twilight groves,

And shadows brown that Sylvan loves

Of Pine, or monumental Oake,

Where the rude Ax with heaved stroke,

Was never heard the Nymphs to daunt,

Or fright them from their hallow'd haunt.

— lines 131-8

At the end of his reverie on poetic Melancholy, the speaker invokes the Muse's song; he imagines that his Muse will reward his studious devotion to her by revealing a heavenly vision:

And as I wake, sweet musick breath

Above, about, or underneath,

Sent by som spirit to mortals good,

Or th'unseen Genius of the Wood.

But let my due feet never fail,

To walk the studious Cloysters pale,

And love the high embowed Roof

With antick Pillars massy proof,

And storied Windows richly dight,

Casting a dimm religious light.

There let the pealing Organ blow,

To the full voic'd Quire below,

In Service high, and Anthems cleer,

As may with sweetnes, through mine ear...

Dissolve me into extasies,

And bring all Heav'n before mine eyes.

— lines 151-67

As the final ten lines reveal, the speaker aspires to a revelation of divine knowledge to inspire his great poetry:

And may at last my weary age

Find out the peaceful hermitage,

The Hairy Gown and Mossy Cell,

Where I may sit and rightly spell

Of every Star that Heav'n doth shew,

And every Herb that sips the dew;

Till old experience do attain

To somthing like prophetic strain.

These pleasures Melancholy give,

And I with thee will choose to live.

— lines 168-76

The final couplet issues an ultimatum to the Melancholy mood; the speaker will devote himself to the existence of a solitary hermit, staking his life upon the contemplative ideal he has illustrated throughout the poem, which he imagines will be rewarded by a vision of the divine.

== Themes ==
According to Barbara Lewalski, Il Penseroso, along with L'Allegro, "explore and contrast in generic terms the ideal pleasures appropriate to contrasting lifestyles ... that a poet might choose, or might choose at different times, or in sequence". In particular, Il Penseroso celebrates Melancholy through the traditional Theocritan pastoral model. The setting focuses on a Gothic scene and emphasises a solitary scholarly life. The speaker of the poem invokes a melancholic mood main character wanders through an urban environment and the descriptions are reminiscent of medieval settings. The main character, in his pursuits, devotes his time to philosophy, to allegory, to tragedy, to Classical hymns, and, finally, to Christian hymns that cause him to be filled with a vision. Besides being set in a traditional form, there is no poetic antecedent for Milton's pairing.

Melancholy, in Il Penseroso, does not have the same parentage as Mirth does in L'Allegro; Melancholy comes from Saturn and Vesta, who are connected to science and a focus on the heavens. Melancholy is connected in the poem with the "heavenly" muse Urania, the goddess of inspiring epics, through her focus and through her relationship with Saturn. Furthermore, she is related to prophecy, and the prophetic account within the final lines of Il Penseroso does not suggest that isolation is ideal, but they do emphasise the importance of experience and an understanding of nature. The higher life found within the poem, as opposed to the one within L'Allegro, allows an individual to experience such a vision.

The poems have been classified in various traditions and genres by various scholars, including: as academic writing by E. M. W. Tillyard; as pastoral by Sara Watson; as part of classical philosophy by Maren-Sofie Rostvig; as part of Renaissance encomia by S. P. Woodhouse and Douglas Bush, and as similar to Homeric hymns and Pindaric odes. Stella Revard believes that the poems follow the classical hymn model which discuss goddesses that are connected to poetry and uses these females to replace Apollo completely.

== Critical reception ==
During the eighteenth century, both Il Penseroso and L'Allegro were popular and were widely imitated. The poet and engraver William Blake, who was deeply influenced by Milton's poetry and personality, made illustrations to both L'Allegro and Il Penseroso.

L'Allegro, il Penseroso ed il Moderato is a pastoral ode by George Frideric Handel based on the poem. In an attempt to unite the two poems into a singular "moral design", at Handel's request, Charles Jennens added a new poem, "il Moderato", to create a third movement.

Stella Revard believes that Milton, in his first publication of poems, "takes care to showcase himself as a poet in these first and last selections and at the same time to build his poetic reputation along the way by skillful positioning of poems such as L'Allegro and Il Penseroso."

The poem features in the Oxford Book of English Verse as edited by Arthur Quiller-Couch.
