= Jasper Mayne =

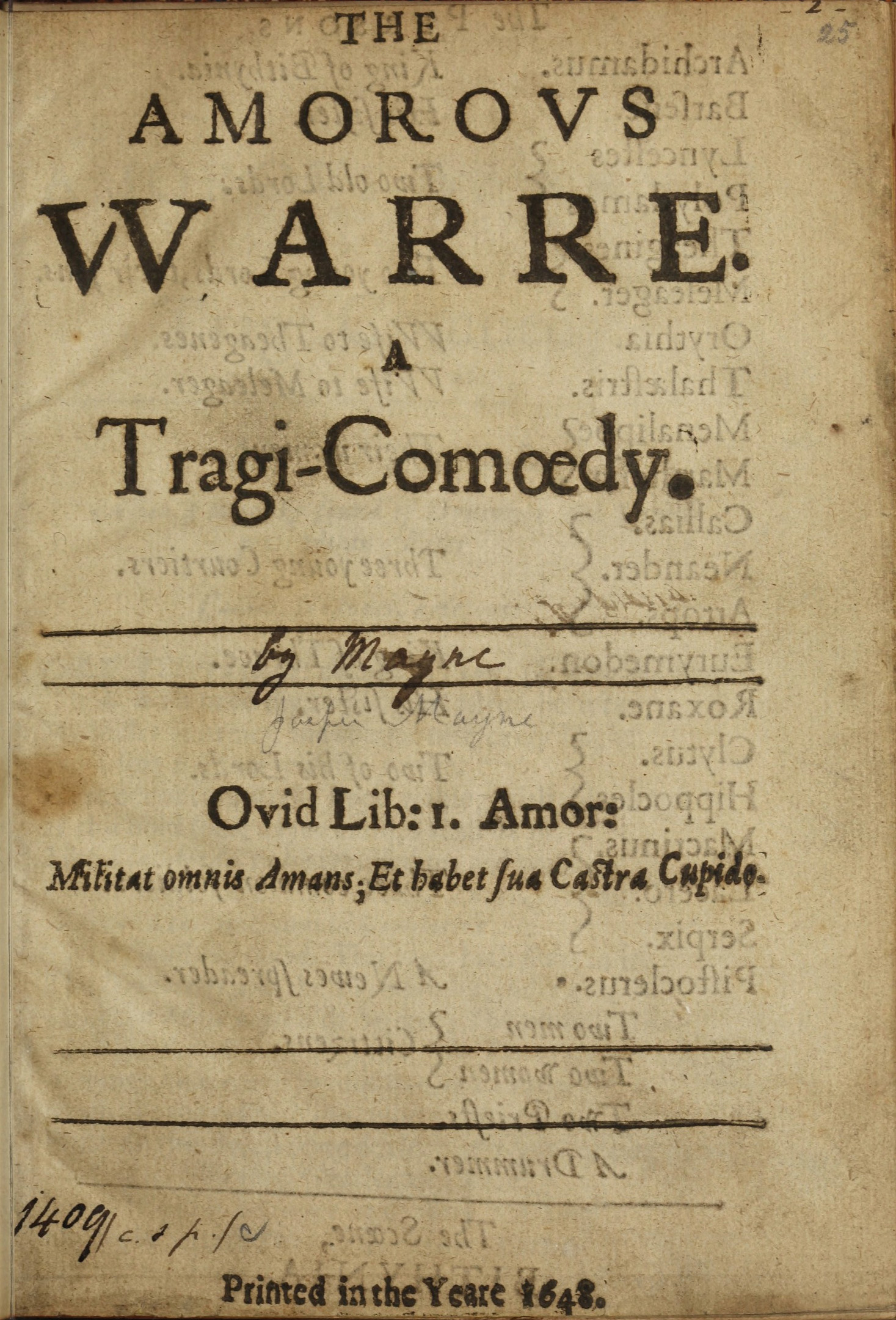
Title page of the first edition of The Amorous Warre, 1648 (Boston Public Library)

Jasper Mayne (1604 – 6 December 1672) was an English clergyman, translator, and a minor poet and dramatist.

Mayne was baptized at Hatherleigh, Devon, on 23 November 1604, and educated at Westminster School and Christ Church, Oxford. He then entered the Church, was given two college livings in Oxfordshire (the vicarages of Cassington near Woodstock, and Pyrton near Watlington), and in 1646 was made a Doctor of Divinity (D.D.). These livings ended under the Commonwealth (1649–1660), when he was turned out of office to become chaplain to the Duke of Devonshire. After the Restoration, he was made canon of Christ Church (1660–1672), Archdeacon of Chichester (1660–1672), and chaplain in ordinary to King Charles II. Burke records that Dr. Mayne gave £500 towards the rebuilding of St. Paul's Cathedral after the Great Fire of London in 1666.

Mayne wrote two plays before giving up poetry as unbefitting his station: The City Match (1639), a domestic farce acted at Whitehall by the command of King Charles I; and The Amorous War (1648), a tragicomedy. His other works include a number of poems and sermons; translations of Lucian of Samosata (1638, 1664), and John Donne's Latin Epigrams; and the preface to the 1647 Beaumont and Fletcher first folio.

In an amusing anecdote recounted in Blackwood's Magazine, Dr. Mayne is said to have bequeathed a trunk to an old servant, noting that it contained something that would make him drink. When opened, it was found to contain a red herring.

Shakespeare scholar Sidney Lee proposed Jasper Mayne as a possible identity of the "I. M." who wrote the fourth commendatory verse in the First Folio of Shakespeare's plays (1623). Yet since Mayne was only nineteen years old at the time the Folio was published, scholars have tended to favor James Mabbe.

Mayne died on 6 December 1672 at Oxford, and was interred on the north side of the choir at Christchurch.
