= On the Morning of Christ's Nativity =

1645 nativity ode by John Milton

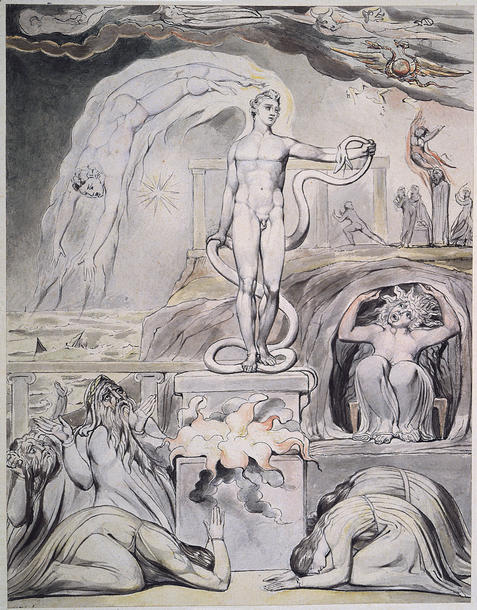
The Overthrow of Apollo and the Pagan Gods (1809), one of William Blake's illustrations of On the Morning of Christ's Nativity

On the Morning of Christ's Nativity is a nativity ode written by John Milton in 1629 and published in his Poems of Mr. John Milton (1645). The poem describes Christ's Incarnation and his overthrow of earthly and pagan powers. The poem also connects the Incarnation with Christ's Crucifixion.

== Background ==
Milton composed On the Morning of Christ's Nativity in December 1629, after celebrating reaching the age of maturity in England, in commemoration of the Nativity of Jesus. It was written while Charles Diodati, Milton's friend, was composing his poem, and the poem reflects his sober, contemplative lifestyle in comparison to Diodati's extravagant way of living. The ode was composed during a time in Milton's life when he based his understanding of religion on Scripture, but he was still influenced by myth.

Although the ode was the first poem of Milton's 1645 collection, it was not the first poem that he wrote; many of the Latin and Greek poems included in the 1645 collection were composed during an earlier time. According to Thomas Corns, "Quite probably, its location indicates the poet's assessment of its quality"; this consideration is significant because Humphrey Moseley, an important bookseller, was the publisher of the volume and the ode serves as an introduction to Milton's poetry.

== Form ==
The poem is divided into two sections. "The Hymn," which comprises the bulk of the poem (27 stanzas) is prefaced by a four stanza introduction.

Milton's introductory stanzas are seven lines each: five lines of iambic pentameter, using the rhyme scheme ABABB, followed by a rhyming couplet. The final line of each stanza is written in iambic hexameter. For example, see the first stanza:

This is the month, and this the happy morn / Wherein the Son of Heav'n's eternal King, / Of wedded maid, and virgin mother born, / Our great redemption from above did bring; / For so the holy sages once did sing, / That he our deadly forfeit should release, / And with his Father work us a perpetual peace.

The hymnal stanzas are eight lines each, uniformly written in iambic meter. As in the introductory stanzas, the final two lines form a rhyming couplet, with a line in tetrameter followed by a line in hexameter, which closes out each stanza. The first six lines are made up of two tercets organized by the rhyme scheme AABCCB. The first two lines of each tercet are in trimeter, and the third in pentameter. For example, the first stanza of the Hymn:

It was the winter wild, / While the Heav'n-born-child, / All meanly wrapped in the rude manger lies; / Nature in awe to him / had doffed her gaudy trim / With her great master so to sympathize: / It was no season then for her / To wanton with the sun her lusty paramour.

== Themes ==
The ode with The Passion and Upon the Circumcision form a set of poems that celebrate important Christian events: Christ's birth, the feast of the Circumcision, and Good Friday. The topic of these poems places them within a genre of Christian literature popular during the 17th century and places Milton alongside of poets like John Donne, Richard Crashaw, and George Herbert. However, Milton's poetry reflects the origins of his anti-William Laud and anti-Church of England based religious beliefs.

The poem deals with both the Nativity and the Incarnation of Christ and Milton believed that the two were connected. The Nativity and the Crucifixion represent Christ's purpose as Christ in Milton's poetry, and contemporary poem, because Christ becomes human-like in the Nativity to redeem fallen man and humanity is redeemed when Christ sacrifices himself during the Crucifixion. Milton's reliance on the connection is traditional, and Milton further connects the Nativity with the creation of the world, a theme that is expanded upon later in Book VII of Paradise Lost. Like the other two poems of the set and like other poems at the time, the ode describes a narrator within the poem and experiencing the Nativity.

== Critical response ==
The ode has, according to Thomas Corns, "generally been recognized as Milton's first manifestation of poetic genius and, qualitatively, a poem to be set alongside 'Lycidas' and A Masque presented at Ludlow Castle, 1634 as his most significant poetic works before Paradise Lost." He further claims that the ode "rises in many ways above the rather commonplace achievements of Milton's other devotional poems and stands out from the mass of other early Stuart poems about Christmas."

== In music ==
- In 1928 the first complete setting of Milton's Ode was undertaken by the Cambridge composer Cyril Rootham. The work is set for soli, chorus, semi-chorus and orchestra.
- Portions of the ode are set as part of the text of Ralph Vaughan Williams' Christmas cantata, Hodie (1954).
- Stanza XIII of the Hymn portion of this poem was set by Stephen Paulus in the second movement - "Ring Out! Ye Crystal Spheres" - of his 1990 work "Canticum Novum".
- John Blackwood McEwen, Hymn on the Morning of Christ's Nativity, Ode for soprano, chorus and orchestra (1905).
