= Lobert =

Lobert is a surname. Notable people with the surname include:

- Annie Lobert (born 1967), American call girl and evangelist
- Frank Lobert (1883–1932), American baseball player
- Hans Lobert (1881–1968), American baseball player, coach, and scout
- Jonathan Lobert (born 1985), French sailor

== See also ==
- Hobert
