= Feast of the Crown of Thorns =

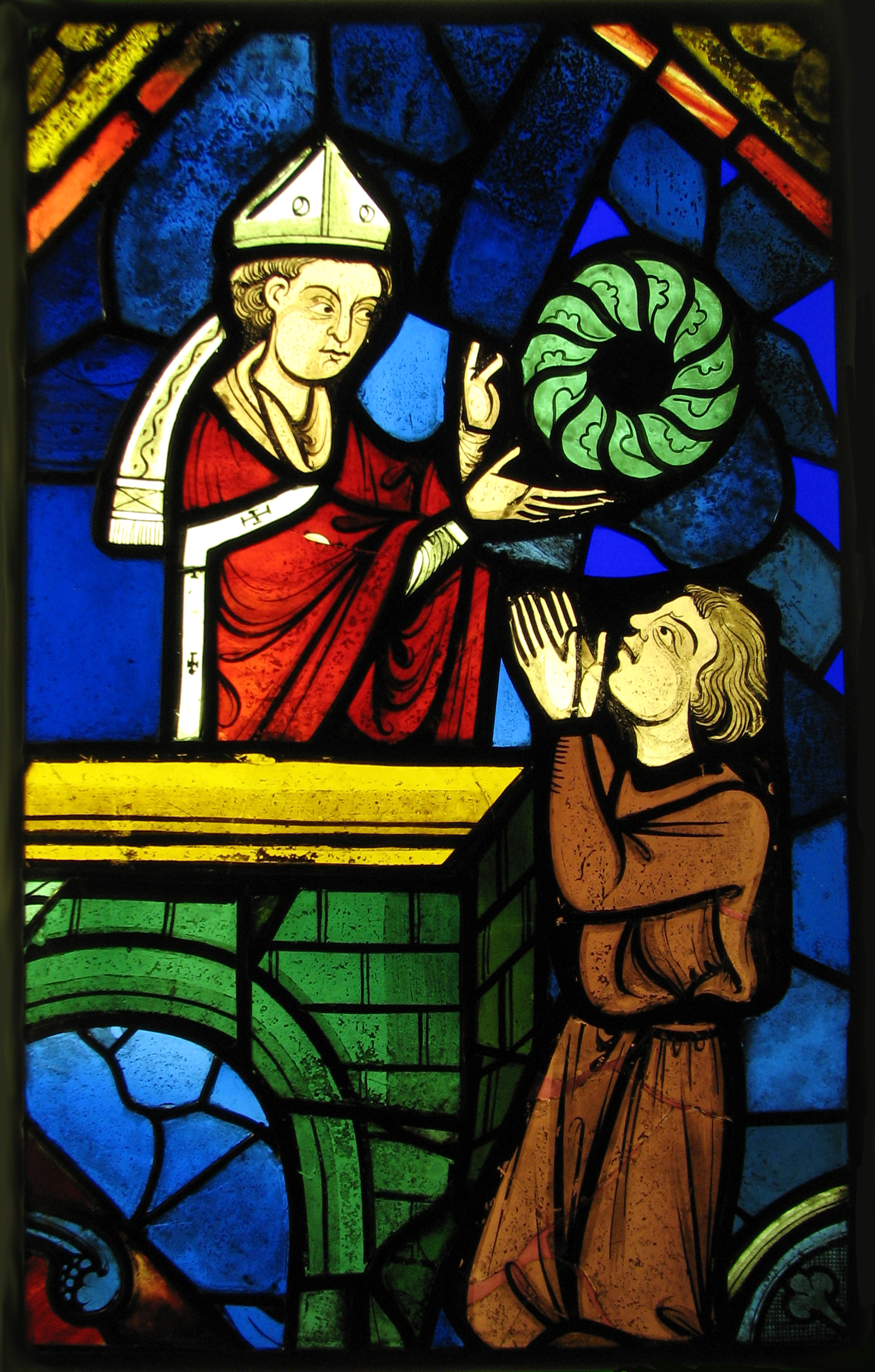
A stained glass window depicts veneration of the Crown of Thorns.

The Feast of the Crown of Thorns is a feast day of the Roman Catholic Church, for the Friday after Ash Wednesday. It is not universally observed.

== History ==
The first feast in honour of the Crown of Thorns (Festum susceptionis coronae Domini) was instituted at Paris in 1239, when Louis IX of France brought there the relic of the Crown of Thorns, which was deposited later in the Royal Chapel, erected in 1241–48 to guard this and other relics of the Passion. The feast, observed on 11 August, though at first special to the Royal Chapel, was gradually observed throughout the north of France.

In the following century another festival of the Holy Crown on 4 May was instituted and was celebrated along with the Feast of the Invention of the Cross in parts of Spain, Germany, and Scandinavia. It was later kept in Spanish dioceses and is observed by the Dominicans on 24 April.

A special feast on the Monday after Passion Sunday was granted to the Diocese of Freising in Bavaria, by Pope Clement X (1676) and Pope Innocent XI (1689) in honour of the Crown of Christ. It was celebrated at Venice in 1766 on the second Friday of March. In 1831 it was adopted at Rome as a double major and is observed on the Friday following Ash Wednesday. As it is not kept universally, the Mass and Office are placed in the appendices to the Breviary and the Missal. The hymns of the Office, which is taken from the seventeenth-century Gallican Breviary of Paris, were composed by Habert. The Analecta hymnica of Dreves and Blume contains a large number of rhythmical offices, hymns, and sequences for this feast.
