= Reliquiae Sacrae Carolinae =

1650 civil and sacred writing by Charles I of England

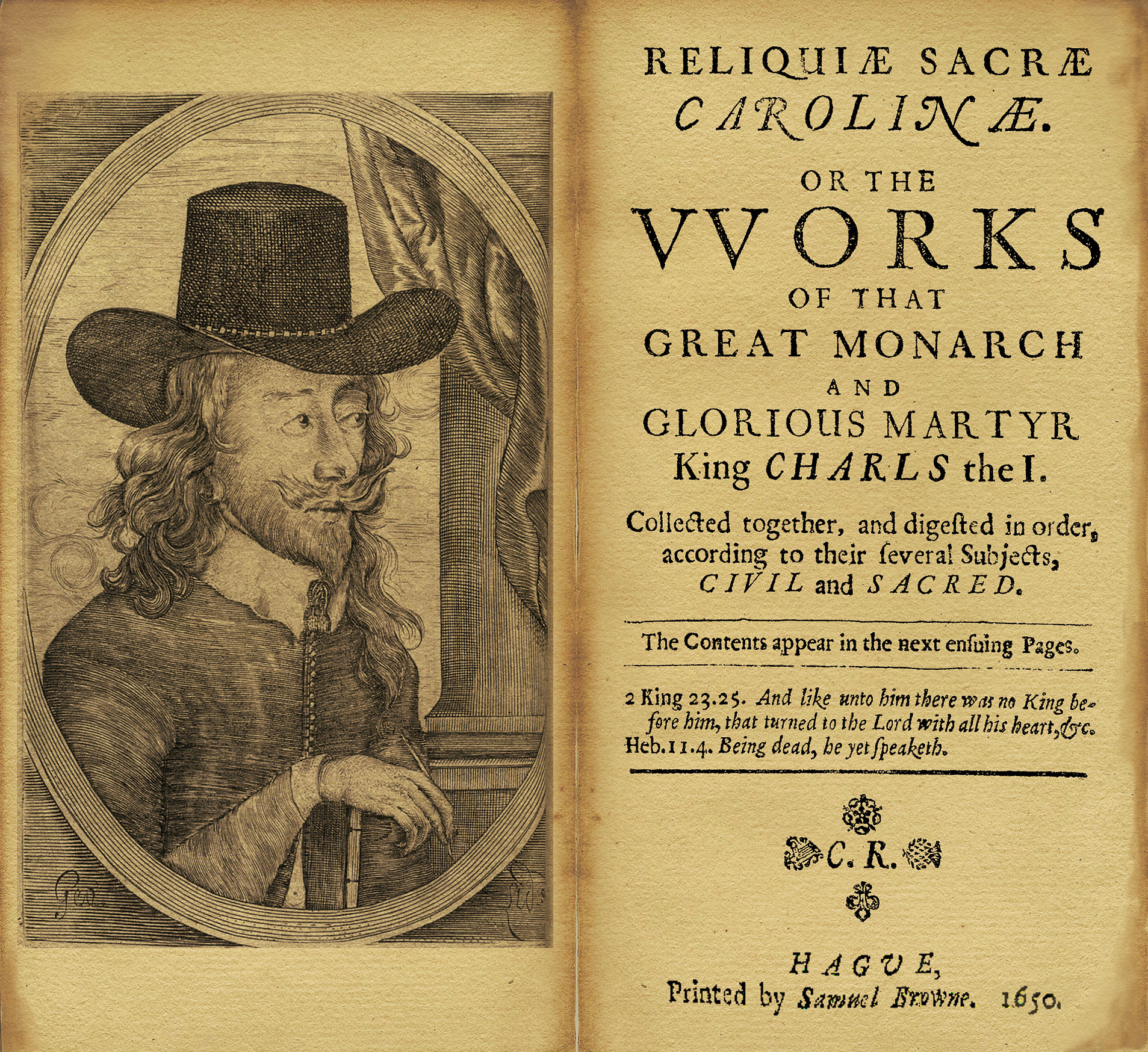
Reliquiae Sacrae Carolinae first edition front folio consisting of an image of the King and the title page

The Reliquiae Sacrae Carolinae (Latin: Reliquiæ Sacræ Carolinæ), or The Works of That Great Monarch and Glorious Martyr King Charls the I, is a book that deals with the events leading to the execution of Charles I of England. Originally published in 1650, it is a collective work of the civil and sacred writings on the King. It incorporates the Eikon Basilike (the "sacred") as well as speeches and letters by the King (the "civil") during the rise of Oliver Cromwell and the Parliamentarians. It is sometimes referred to as "The King's Works" (the Eikon Basilike is also known as "The King's Book").

As with the Eikon itself, the Reliquiae was published specifically to elicit sympathy for the recently executed King, and the Royalist (Cavalier) cause in general. As such, it can be considered a piece of Royalist propaganda. The printing of the book was outlawed by the Parliament of England and the printers attempted to avoid punishment by using false imprints. The first edition (shown) was supposedly printed in The Hague by Samuel Browne, but actually compiled by Richard Royston and printed by Richard Norton in London.

== Background ==
The Eikon Basilike appeared just days after the King's execution, and was wildly successful. Demand was such that it ran to many editions and reprints (Almack suggests as many as 50 editions in the first 6 months). Before long, additional Royalist material, such as the King's prayers, began to appear in some of these later editions. Other material variously included was Reasons (the King's reasoning against the jurisdiction of the court that convicted him), various Letters, Relations (speeches to his children prior to his execution) and Epitaph. Much of this additional material had been published separately.

The first edition of the Reliquiae appeared in 1650 and brought all this additional material, and more, together in one publication. Three further editions were produced by 1658. Later editions of the King's Works were produced but which no longer included the words "Reliquiæ Sacræ Carolinæ" in the title.

== Contents ==
The book is divided into in two parts: The First Part, concerning matters civil, and The Second Part, concerning matters sacred.

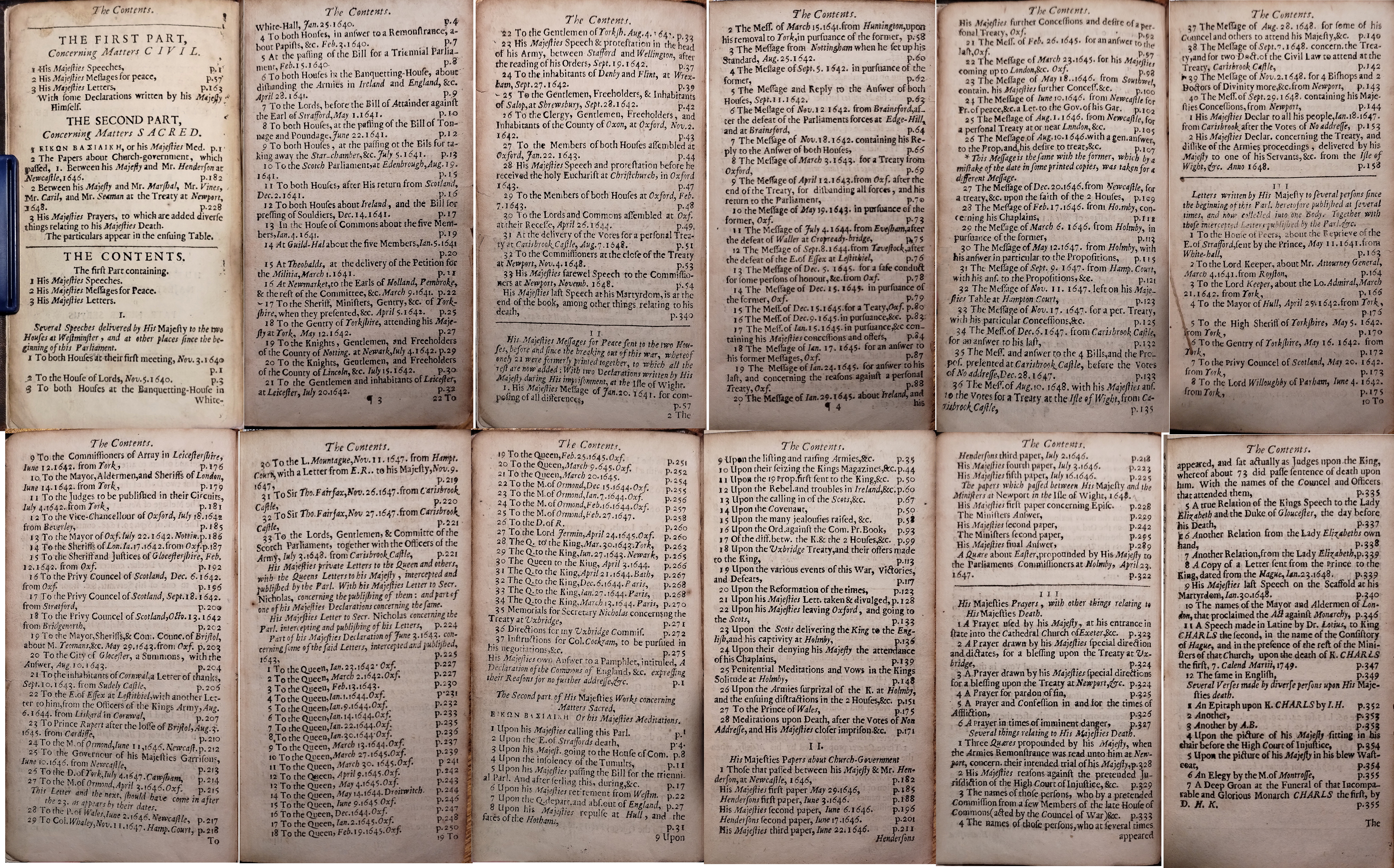
Contents pages from the 1st edition of the Reliquiae, 1650

=== The First Part ===
This contains 33 of his Majesties speeches, 40 messages for peace, and 33 letters. It also contains private letters to the Queen and others that were intercepted and published by Parliament.

Speeches: "Several Speeches delivered by His Majesty to the two Houses at Westminster, and at other places since the beginning of this Parliament"

Most of the speeches relate to events leading to the beginning of the civil war, and were made to Parliament, until the war broke out, and later to Royalist forces in various parts of the country. The dated speeches are most revealing when seen in the context of the history of the time, beginning with Charles I's dealings with the Long Parliament.

These are some of the more notable speeches:

Speech 1 was made to Parliament at its first sitting on 3 November 1640, where Charles requested money for maintaining his army against the Scots. This was his main, perhaps only, reason for recalling Parliament.

Speech 7, made to Parliament on 1 May 1641, before acquiescing to the Bill of Attainder against the Earl of Strafford, which ultimately led to the Earl's execution.

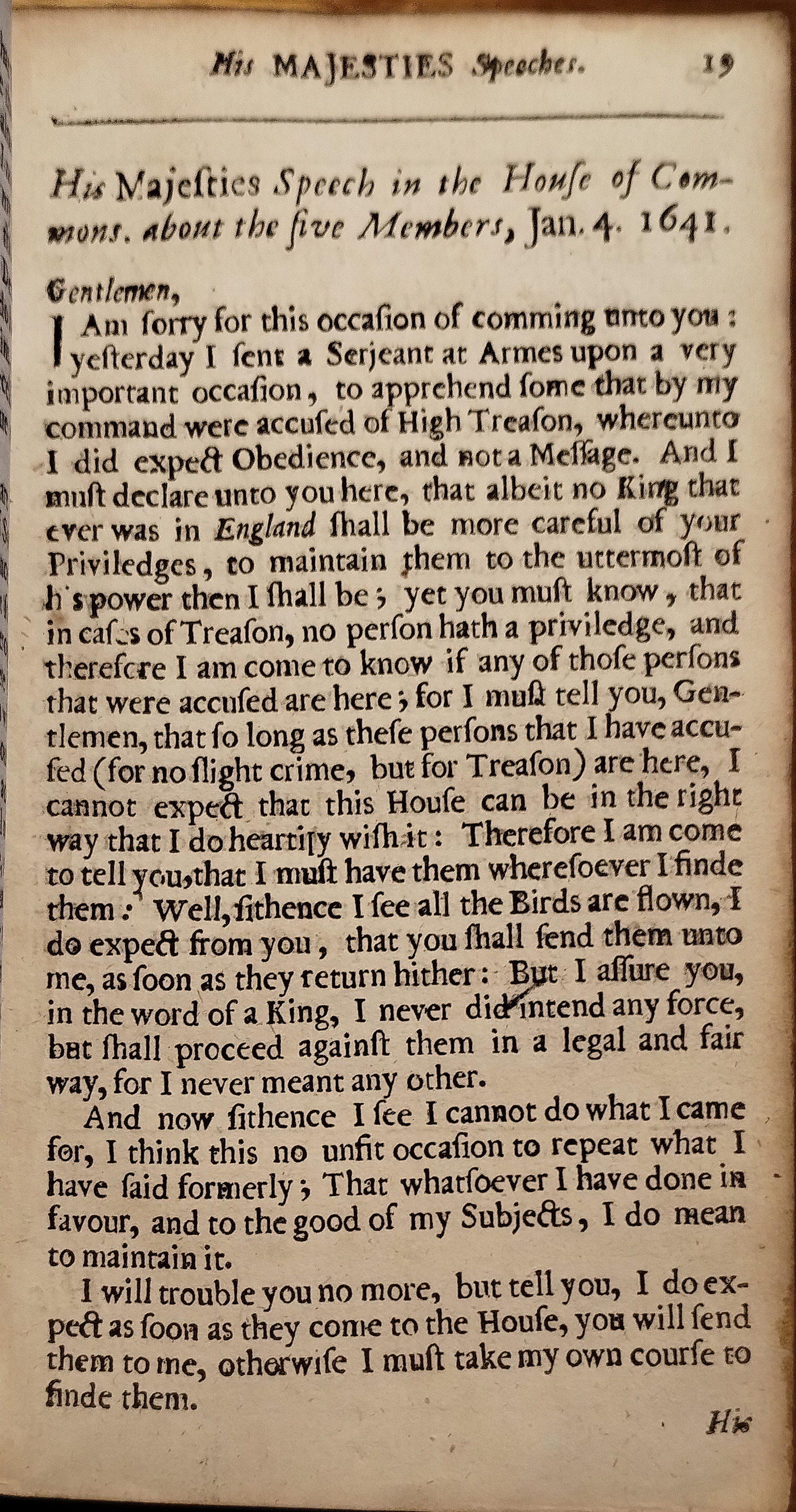
Charles I of England's speech upon entering Parliament with an armed guard intending to arrest five members he accused of treason.

Speech 13 was made to the House of Common "about the five members", 4 January 1641 (N.S. 1642). This was the occasion when the King entered Parliament with an armed guard, with the intention of arresting five members he accused of treason for colluding with the invading Scots. The action outraged MPs and lost Charles support amongst sympathetic members. The occasion was pivotal in precipitating the war:

I am sorry for this occasion of coming unto you: yesterday I sent a Serjeant at Armes upon a very important occasion, to apprehend some that by my command were accused of High Treason, whereunto I did expect Obedience, and not a Message. And I must declare unto you here, that albeit no King that ever was in England shall be more careful of your Priviledges, to maintain them to the uttermost of his power then I shall be; yet you must know, that in cases of Treason, no person hath a priviledge, and therefore I am come to know if any of those persons that were accused are here; for I must tell you, Gentlemen, that so long as these persons that I have accused (for no slight crime, but for Treason) are here, I cannot expect that this House can be in the right way that I do heartily wish it: Therefore I am come to tell you, that I must have them wheresoever I finde them. Well, sithence I see all the Birds are flown, I do expect you, that you shall send them unto me, as soon as they return hither: But I assure you, in the word of the King, I never did intend any force, but shall proceed against them in a legal and fair way, for I never meant any other.

And now sithence I see I cannot do what I came for, I think this no unfit occasion to repeat what I have said formerly; That whatsoever I have done in favour, and to the good of my subjects, I do mean to maintain it.

I will trouble you no more, but tell you, I do expect as soon as they come to the House, you will send them to me, otherwise I must take my own course to finde them.

Speech 14 was made on the following day to the Guild Hall, on the same subject:

Gentleman,

I have come to demand such prisoners as I have already attainted of High Treason, and do believe they are shrouded in the City, I hope no good man will keep them from Me, their offences are Treason and misdemeanours of an high nature, I desire your loving assistance herein, that they may be brought to a legall trial.

And whereas there are divers suspicions raised, that I am a favourer of the Popish Religion, I do professe in the name of a King, that I did and ever will, and that to the utmost of My power, be a prosecutor of all such that as shall oppose the Laws and Statutes of this Kingdom, either Papist or Separatist, and not onely so, but I will maintain and defend that true Protestant Religion which my Father did professe: and I will still continue in, during life.

Shortly after this point Charles lost control of London, and subsequent speeches (16–26) were made in other parts of the country as he strove to raise an army against the militia that the Parliamentarians were assembling, and also to the Royalist Parliament that was established in Oxford. The final speeches (31–33) were made whilst in captivity in Carisbrooke Castle on the Isle of Wight.

Messages for Peace: "His Majesties Messages for Peace sent to the two Houses, before and since the breaking out of this war, whereof onely 21 were formerly printed together, to which all the rest are now added: With two Declarations written by His Majesty during His imprisonment, at the Isle of Wight."

Letters: "Letters written by His Majesty to several persons since the beginning of this Parl. heretofore published at several times, and now collected into one Body. Together with those intercepted Letters published by the Parl. etc."

=== The Second Part ===
This consists of the Eikon Basilike itself, his Majesties papers about "Church-Government", prayers and a miscellany of items relating to his death.

Papers: "His Majesties Papers about Church-Government" including "Those that passed between his Majesty & Mr. Henderson, at Newcastle, 1646" and "The papers which passed between His Majesty and the Ministers at Newport in the Isle of Wight, 1648".

==== The Henderson Papers ====
A number of papers were exchanged between the King and Alexander Henderson in 1646 on their differing views of church-government. Henderson was a Presbyterian clergyman who was instrumental in securing Presbyterian control of the Church of Scotland, which had been the subject of the earlier Bishop's Wars. The last paper from Henderson is dated July 3, 1646. He died on Aug 19 1646. These papers were also printed as a separate publication.

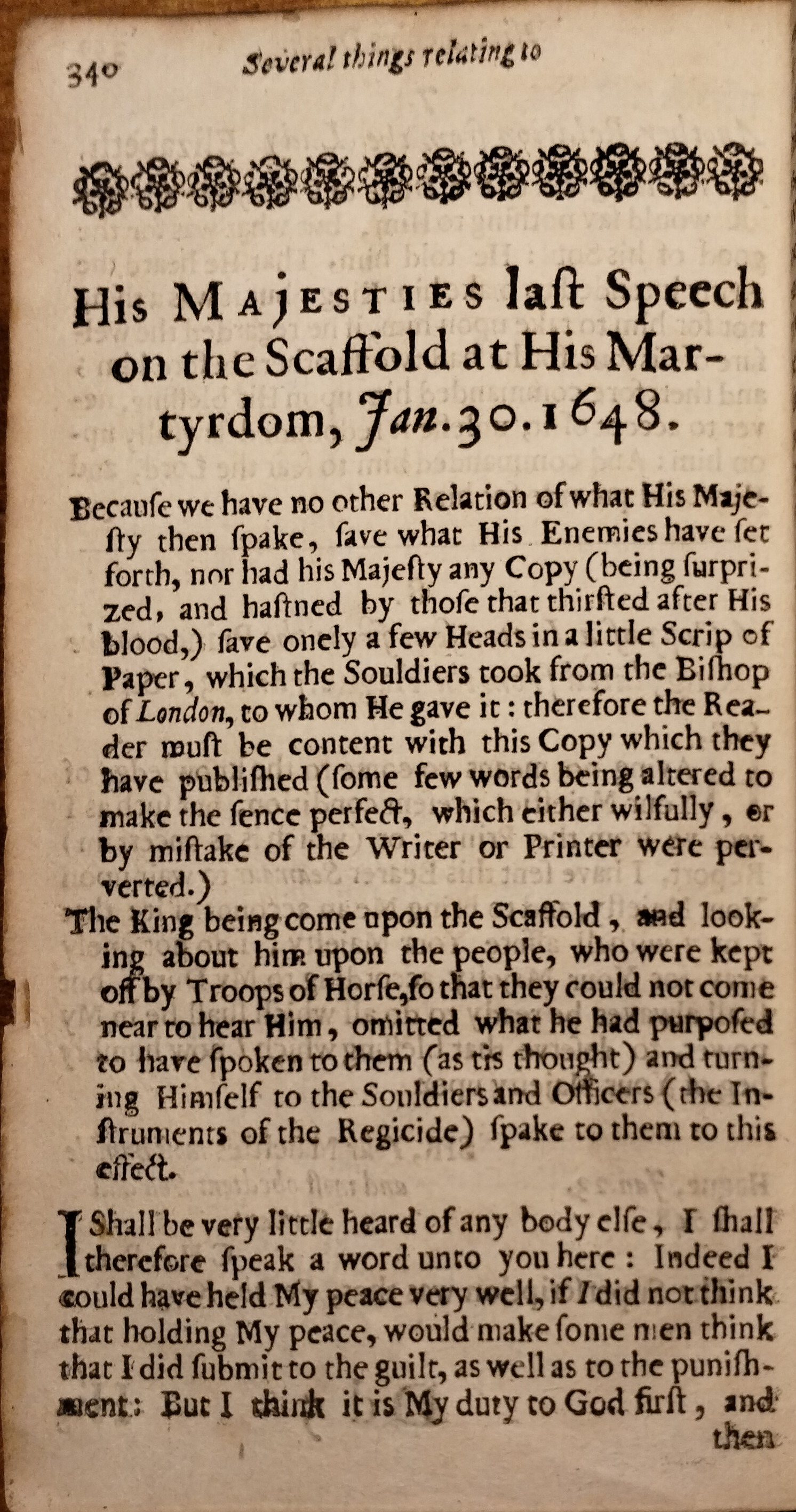
King Charles I's speech from the gallows.

Prayers: "His Majesties Prayers, with other things relating to His Majesties Death"

Amongst the "other things" are the King's reasons against what he referred to as the "pretended Commission of the High Court of Injustice, etc" that sentenced him, and in an deliberate action of finger-pointing, the names of all 73 persons who passed the sentence of death on the King are listed. Notably, the first person named after the president of the jury is Oliver Cromwell.

One of the last items (item 9) is the King's final speech on the scaffold "at his martyrdom", Jan 30 1648.

== Bibliography ==
The bibliography of the Reliquiae was first recorded in A Bibliography of The King's Book or Eikon Basilike by Edward Almack, published in 1896. The later, and now considered definitive, work was produced by Francis F Madan in his A New Bibliography of the Eikon Basilike of King Charles the First, published in 1950.

== Date clarification ==
The dates given in the Reliquiae and quoted here (unless otherwise stated) are "Old style", so that the year shown for dates between 1 January and 25 March is the same as for the preceding December. Thus the date for Charles's execution is recorded as 30 Jan 1648, not 1649 as shown in modern texts.

The 1650 publication date of the Reliquiae shown is therefore ambiguous; by modern reckoning it could be 1650 or 1651 depending on the actual month of publication.

Also England in this period was still using the Julian calendar, and if reckoned by the current Gregorian calendar, dates would be 10 days later i.e. Charles's execution date would be 9 February 1649. Note that the difference in the number of days between the two calendars at this time is not the 11 days that were skipped when the Gregorian calendar was eventually introduced in England in 1752. By that time the two calendars had diverged further than the 10 day difference in 1649.

== Sources ==
The information and images about the Reliquiae contained in this article is taken from its first edition, identified in Madan's bibliography as edition 61 (Almack edition 31).
