= Hobert =

Hobert is a surname. Notable people with the surname include:

- Audrey Hobert (born 1999), American singer-songwriter
- Billy Joe Hobert (born 1971), American football player
- Bob Hobert (1935–1992), Canadian football player
- Michael Hobert, American actor
- Richard Hobert (1951–2025), Swedish screenwriter and film director

== See also ==
- Habert, another surname
- Hubert, another surname and given name
