= Johann Baptist Walpoth =

Austrian sculptor

Johann Baptist Walpoth (Urtijëi, 25 January 1911 - Urtijëi, 2 September 1934) was an Austrian sculptor.

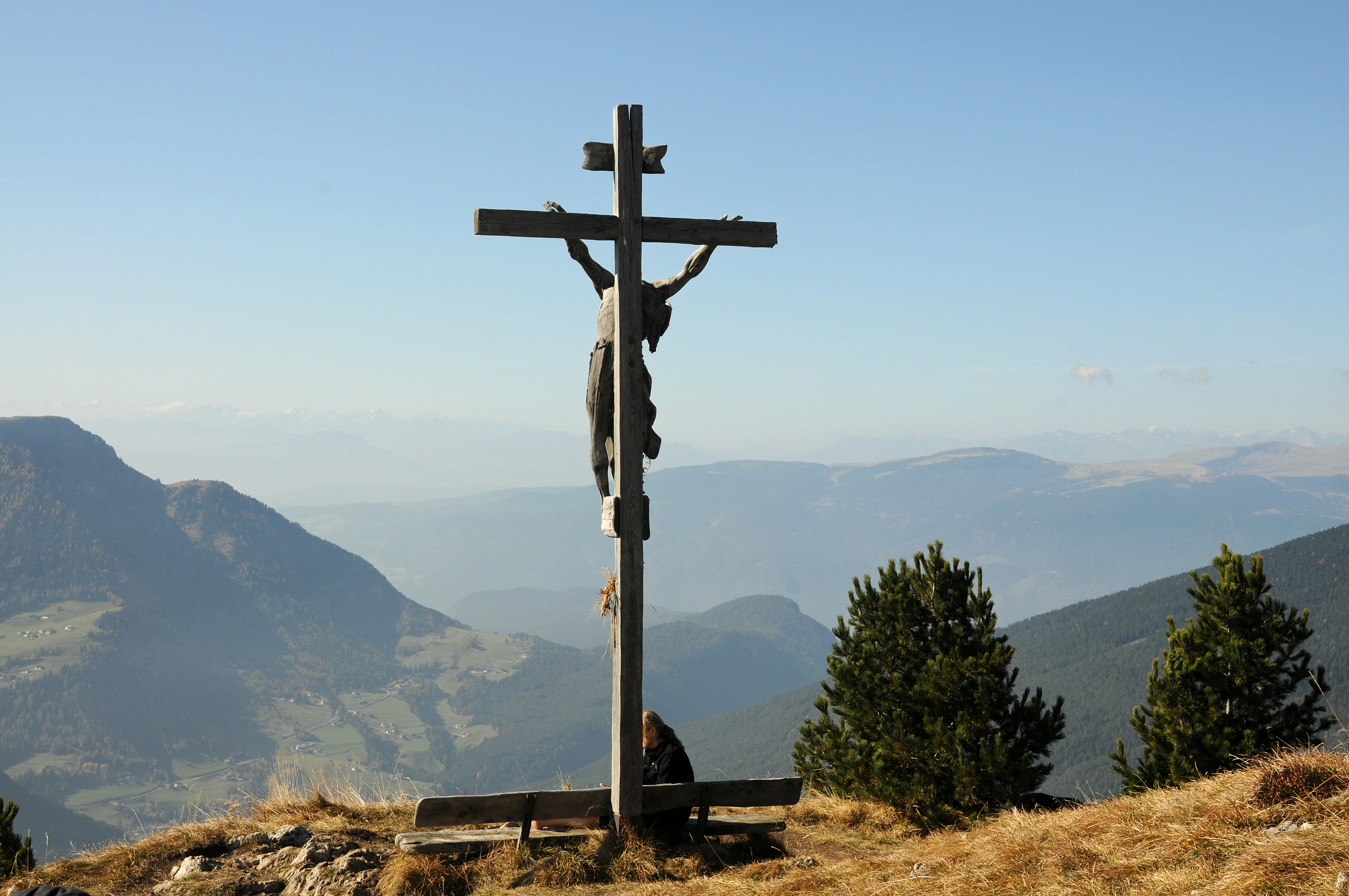
Crucifix of Walpoth and Vinzenz Peristi on Mount Sëura Sas m. 2176

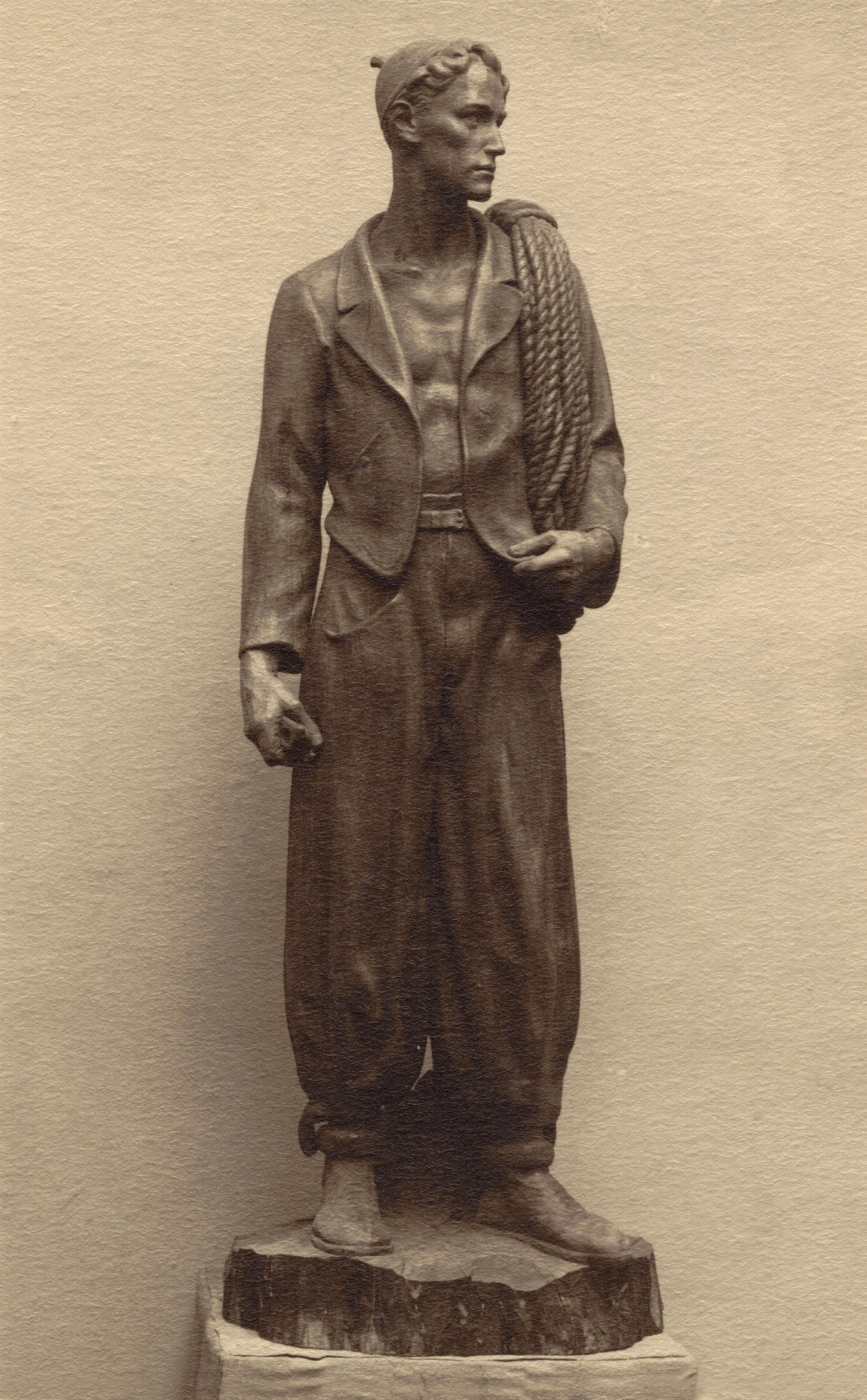
Woodcarved mountaineer by Walpoth.

== Biography ==
Johann Baptist Walpoth, also called Batista da Lësc, was born in the Junerëi farm, son of Luis Walpoth sculptor and Katherina Bernardi da Lësc, a seamstress specialized in making costumes typical of Val Gardena. Walpoth was born into a family of artists such as his sister Cristina, a polychromatic-gilder. Walpoth was initiated into wood carving in the workshop of Vinzenz Moroder-Scurcià and attended the Urtijëi School of Art, directed at the time by Guido Balsamo Stella, where he had also attended the modeling course held by Ludwig Moroder-Lenert. In 1934 he worked in Luis Insam-Tavella's workshop. He died following a hunting accident in the Resciesa woods in Urtijëi.

== Works ==
- The crucifix of Mount Sëura Sas, carved in wood on the mountain itself with Vincenzo Peristi, currently exhibited in the Museum of Val Gardena in Urtijëi.
- A statue of a mountain guide and a crucifix purchased by the Duchess of Pistoia, Lydia of Arenberg, wife of Filiberto of Savoia.

== Gallery of his works ==
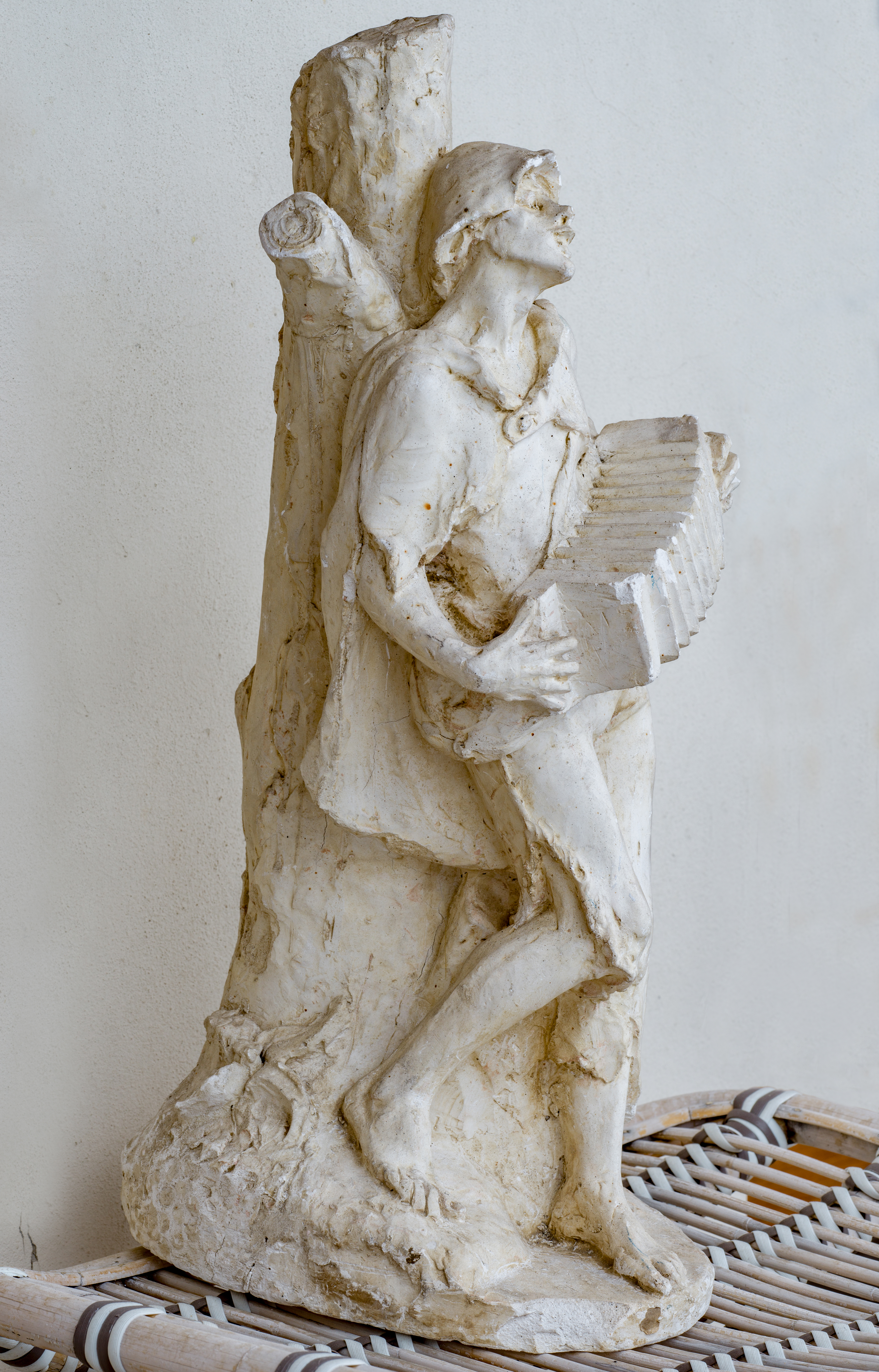
Plaster sketch of an accordion player attributed to Walpoth

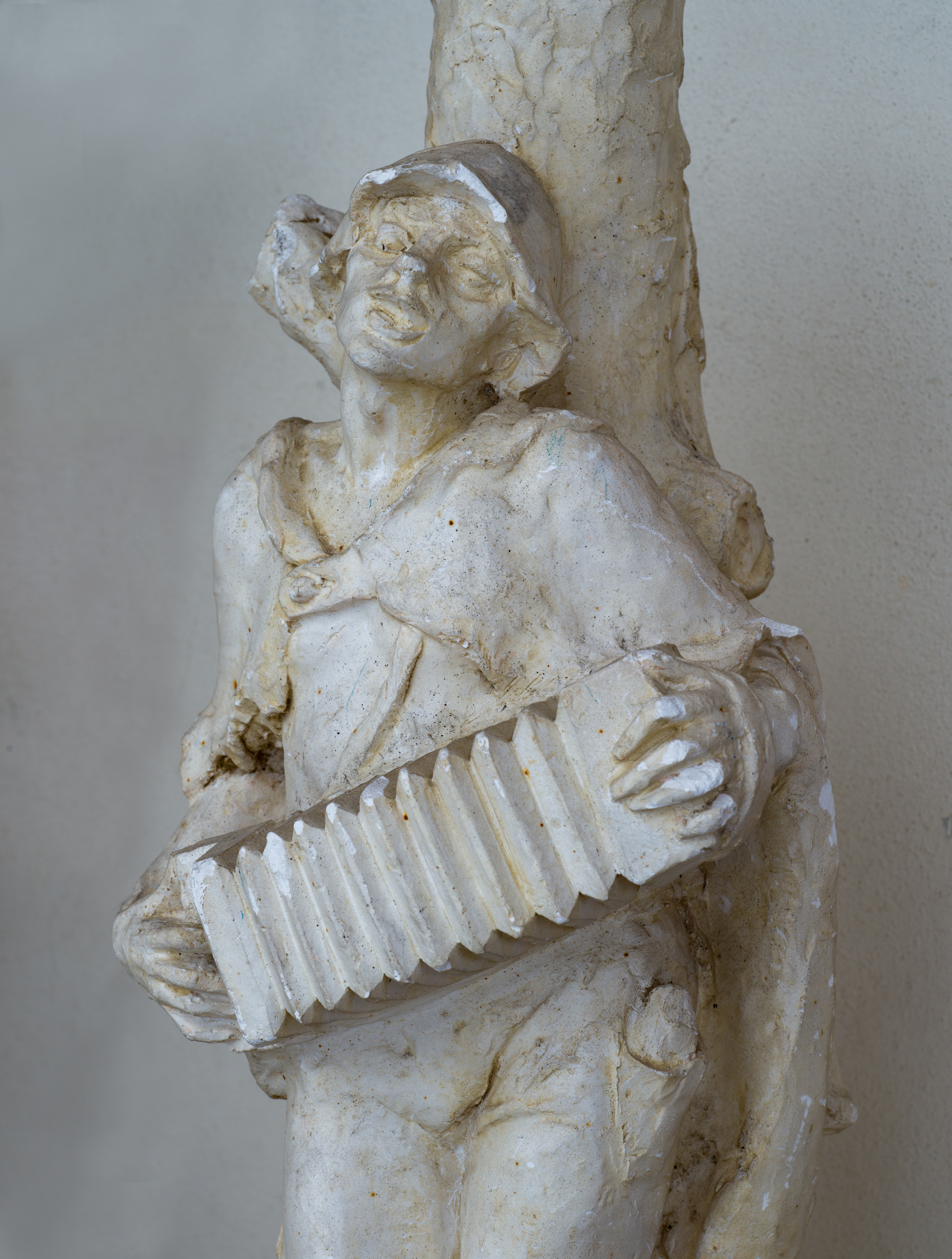
Detail of the accordion player.

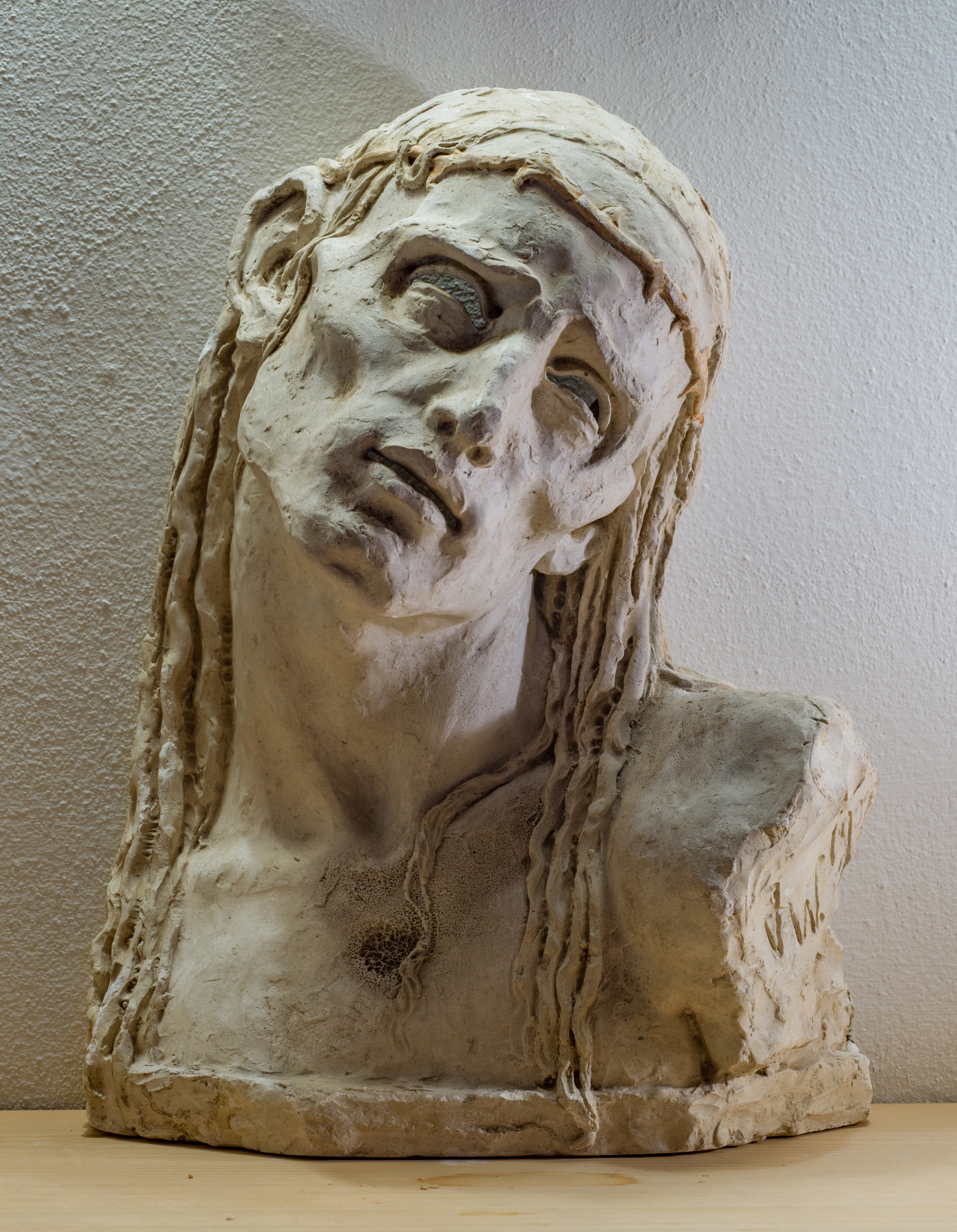
Plaster bust of Christ in crown of thorns signed J.W. 1932.

== Sister projects ==
- Wikimedia Commons contiene immagini o altri file su Johann Baptist Walpoth
