= Habert =

Habert is a surname. Notable people with the surname include:

- Germain Habert (1615–1654), French churchman and brother of Philippe Habert
- Henri Louis Habert de Montmor (1600–1679), French scholar and cousin of Germain and Philippe Habert
- Johann Evangelist Habert (1833–1896), Czech composer and organist
- Marie Dorin Habert (born 1986), French Olympic biathlete
- Philippe Habert (1605-1637), French poet and brother of Germain Habert
- Pierre-Joseph Habert (1773–1825), French general of the Napoleonic Wars
