= List of brutalist structures =

Brutalism is an architectural style that spawned from the modernist architectural movement and which flourished from the 1950s to the 1970s. The following list provides numerous examples of this architectural style worldwide.

== Africa ==
=== Côte d'Ivoire ===
- La Pyramide (building), Abidjan (1973)

=== Kenya ===
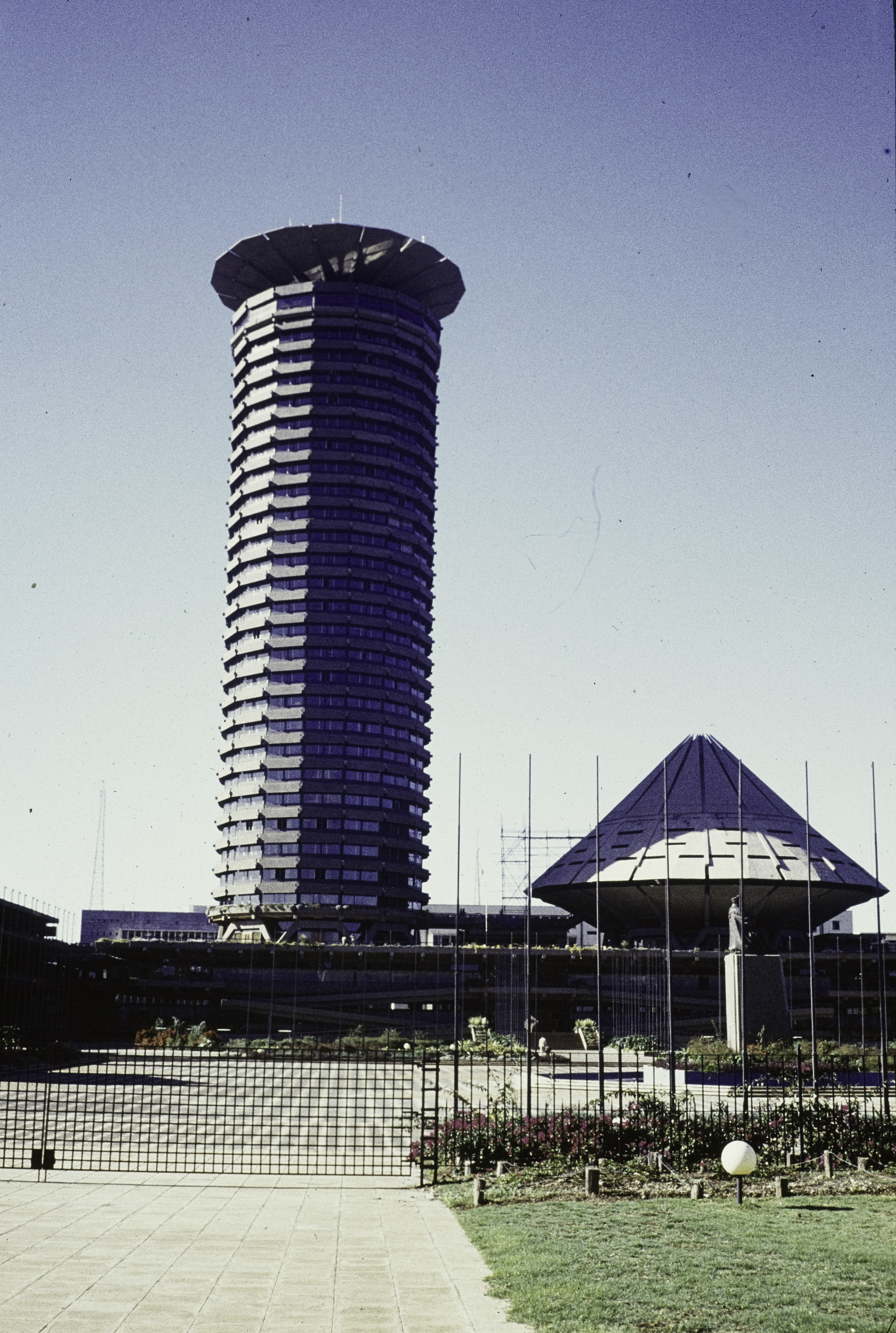
Kenyatta International Conference Centre, 1975.

- Kenyatta International Convention Centre, Nairobi (1973)
- University of Nairobi Mombasa Town Campus
- Kenyatta National Hospital, Nairobi (1952)

=== Sierra Leone ===
- Sierra Leone House of Parliament, Freetown (1967)

=== South Africa ===
- Brixton Tower, Johannesburg (1962)
- Joburg Theatre, Johannesburg (1962)
- Johannesburg Central Police Station, Johannesburg (1968)
- Hillbrow Tower, Johannesburg (1968)
- University of South Africa, Muckleneuk Campus, Tshwane (1972)
- Ponte Tower, Johannesburg (1975)
- Auckland Park Campus, University of Johannesburg (1975)
- South African State Theatre, Tshwane (1981)
- Grand Central Water Tower Midrand, Midrand (1997)

== Asia ==
=== China ===
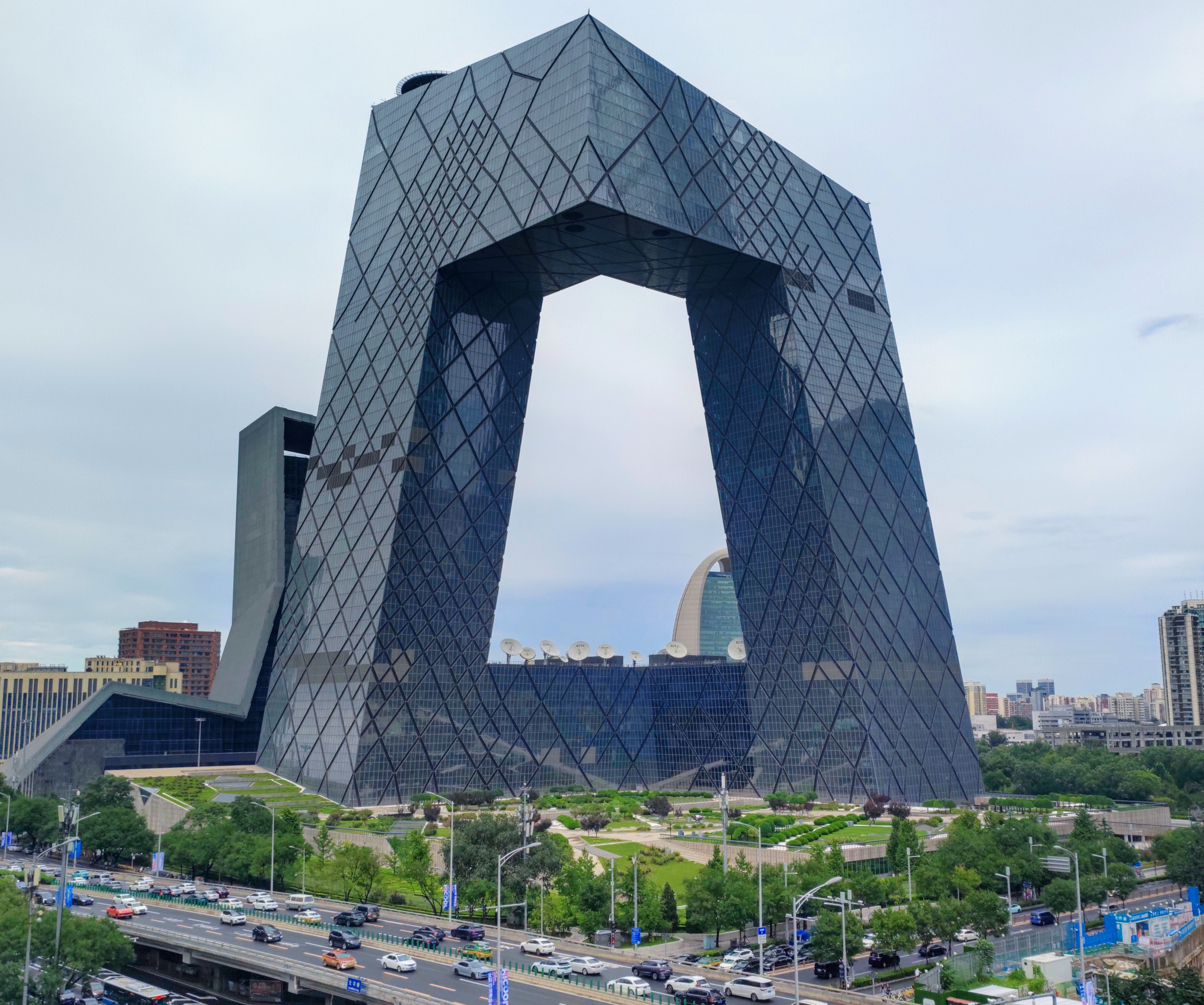
CCTV Headquarters, Beijing (2012)

- Lhasa railway station, Lhasa, Cui Kai, (2006)
- Long Museum, Shanghai, Liu Yichun, Atelier Deshaus, (2014)
- Ningbo Museum, Wang Shu (2008)
- Shenzhen Stock Exchange, Shenzhen, Office for Metropolitan Architecture (OMA), (2013)
- Sifang Art Museum, Nanjing, Steven Holl, (2001)

=== Bangladesh ===
- Jatiyo Sangshad Bhaban (Dhaka National Assembly), Dhaka, Louis Kahn, (1982)

=== India ===
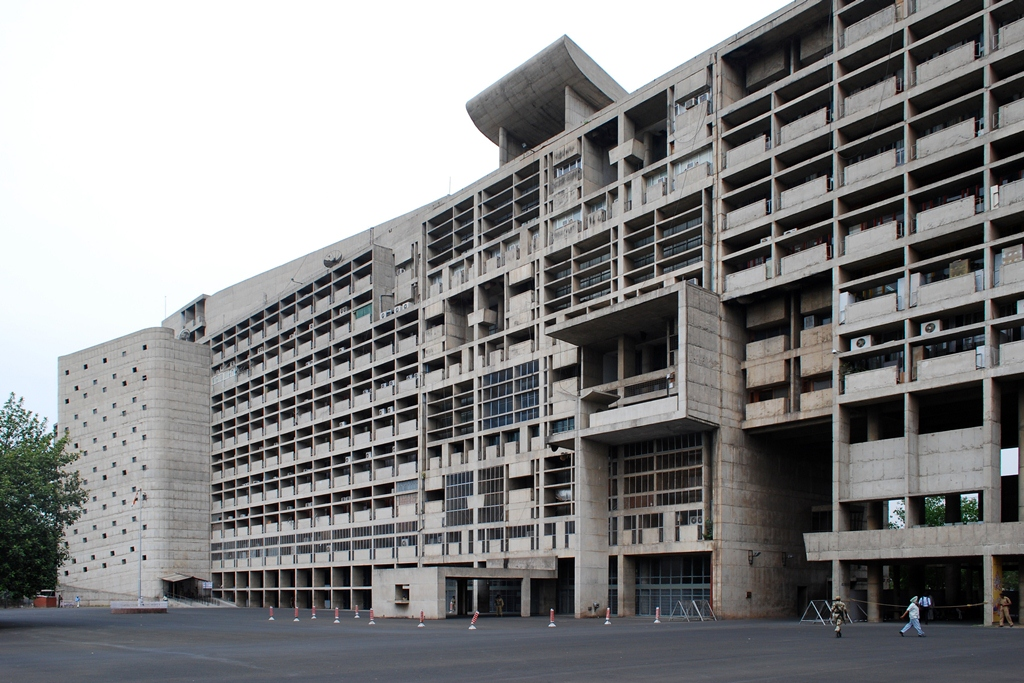
Secretariat Building, Chandigarh, India, part of UNESCO World Heritage site

- Palika Kendra, New Delhi, Kuldip Singh and Mahendra Raj, (1984)
- Secretariat Building, Chandigarh, Le Corbusier, (1953)
- Tagore Memorial Hall, Ahmedabad, B. V. Doshi, (1971)

=== Indonesia ===
Andalas University, Padang (1955)

- Wisma Intiland, Surabaya, Paul Rudolph (1997)
- Library of Bandung Institute of Technology, Bandung (1985)
- Bank Indonesia, Semarang (1992)
- Wisma Hayam Wuruk, Jakarta (1976)
- Bina Manajemen Building, Jakarta (1972)
- Ali Sadikin Building, Ismail Marzuki Park, Jakarta (2019)

=== Iraq ===
- Al Zaqura Building, Baghdad, (1975)

=== Israel ===
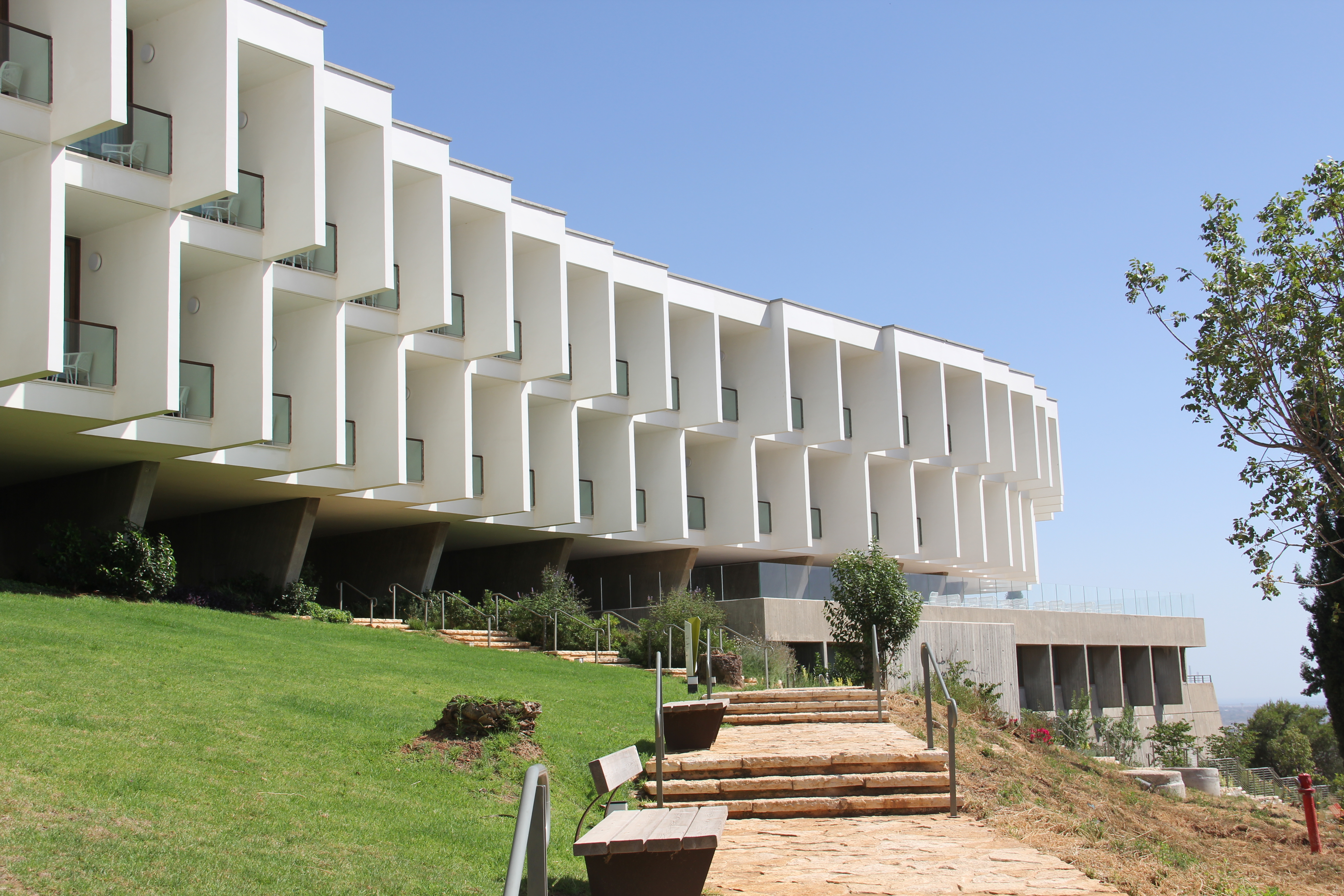
Mivtachim Sanitarium

- Tel Aviv-Yafo City Hall, Tel Aviv-Yafo, Menachem Cohen, (1956–1964)
- Basilica of the Annunciation, Nazareth, Giovanni Muzio, (1960–1969)
- Mivtachim Sanitarium, Zikhron Ya'akov, Yaakov Rechter, (1966)
- The Humanities Building, Ben-Gurion University of the Negev, Raffi Ripper, Amnon Niv, Natan Magen, (1968)
- Carlton Tel Aviv, Yaakov Rechter, (1977)

=== Japan ===
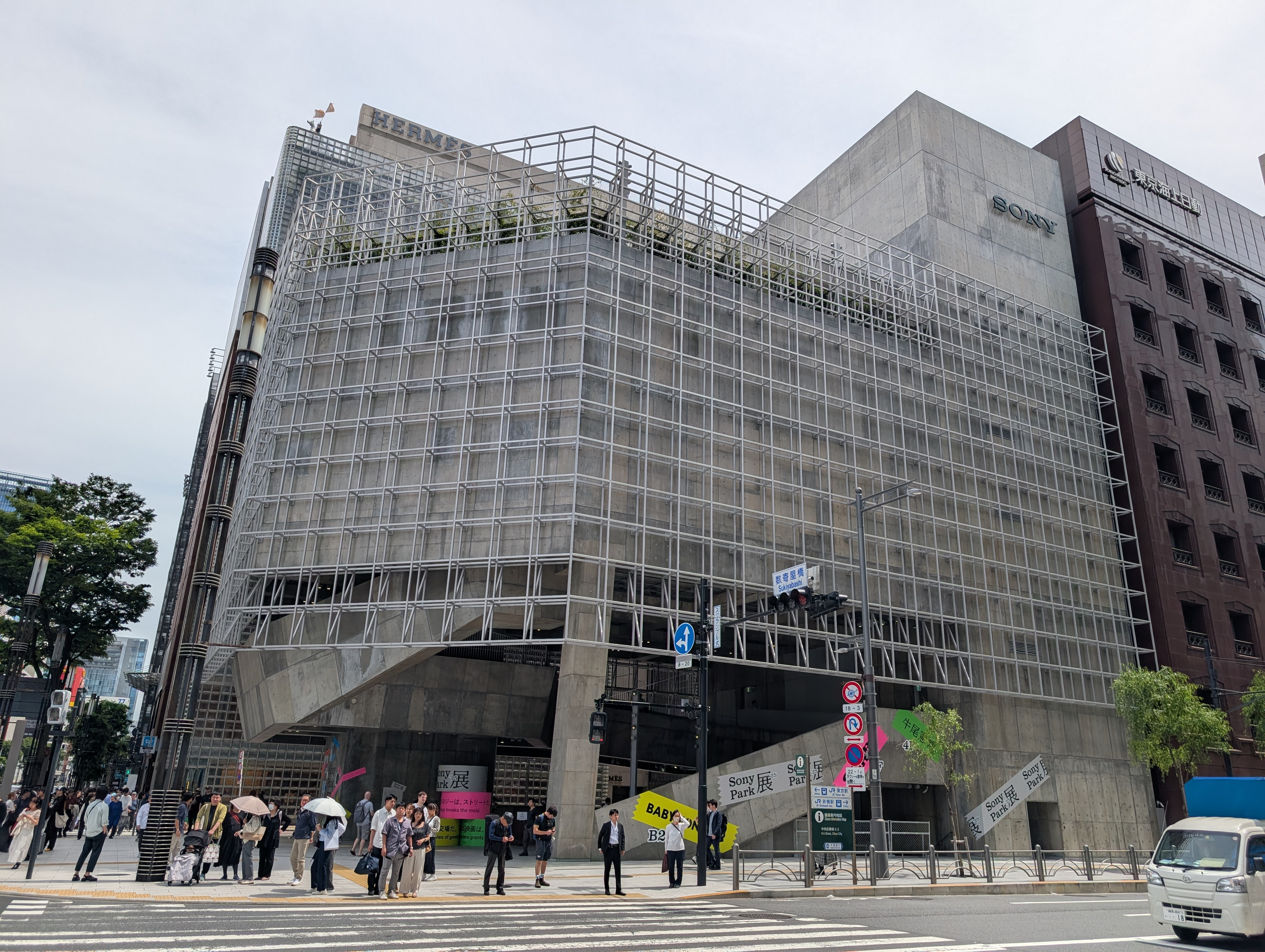
Ginza Sony Park, Tokyo

- Tower House, Tokyo, Takamitsu Azuma, (1967)
- Ginza Sony Park, Tokyo, (2025)

=== Lebanon ===
- The Egg, also known as "The Dome" and "the Soap," Beirut, Joseph Philippe Karam, (1968)

=== Malaysia ===
- University of Malaya, Kuala Lumpur, Dato' Kington Loo/CHR Bailey (1966)
  - Dewan Tunku Canselor
  - Experimental Theatre
  - Faculty of Business and Economics Block H11
  - Faculty of Business and Economics Undergraduate Office
- Sultan Salahuddin Abdul Aziz Shah Building
- National University of Malaysia
- Central Bank of Malaysia

=== Philippines ===
- Tanghalang Pambansa (National Theater), Cultural Center of the Philippines Complex, Pasay, Philippines (Leandro V. Locsin, 1969)
- Philippine International Convention Center, Manila, Philippines (Leandro V. Locsin)
- Ninoy Aquino International Airport Terminal 1, Parañaque, Philippines (Leandro V. Locsin)
- San Miguel Corporation Head Office Complex, Pasig, Philippines

=== Singapore ===
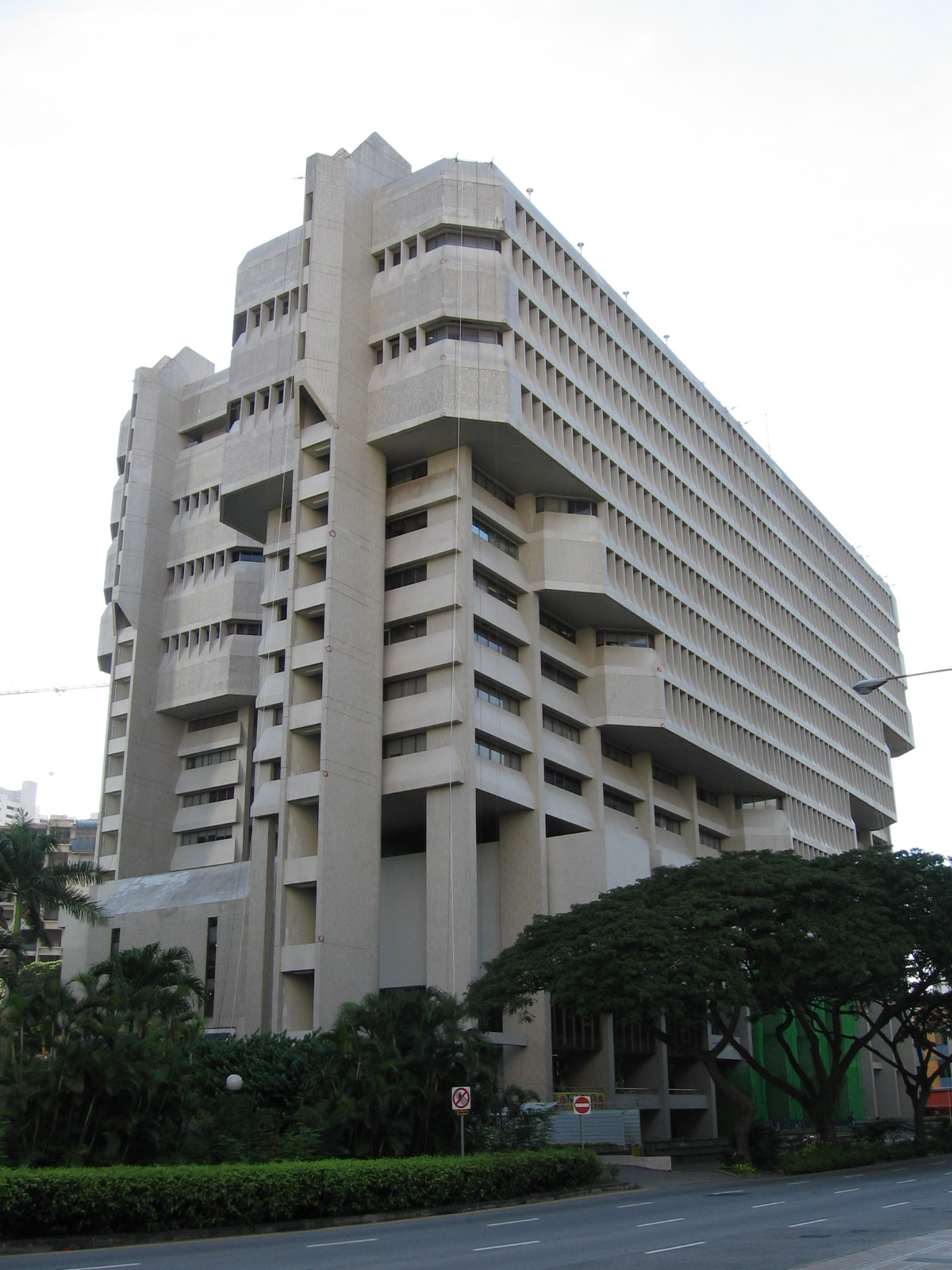
Singapore Power Building

- Singapore Power Building, Singapore, Group 2 Architects, (1971)
- Golden Mile Complex, Singapore, DP Architects, (1973)

=== Vietnam ===
- Ho Chi Minh Mausoleum, Hanoi, Garol Isakovich, (1975)
- Independence Palace, Ho Chi Minh City, Ngô Viết Thụ (1966)

== Europe ==
=== Belgium ===
- CBR Building, Watermael-Boitsfort, Brussels (Constantin Brodzki, 1970)

=== Bulgaria ===
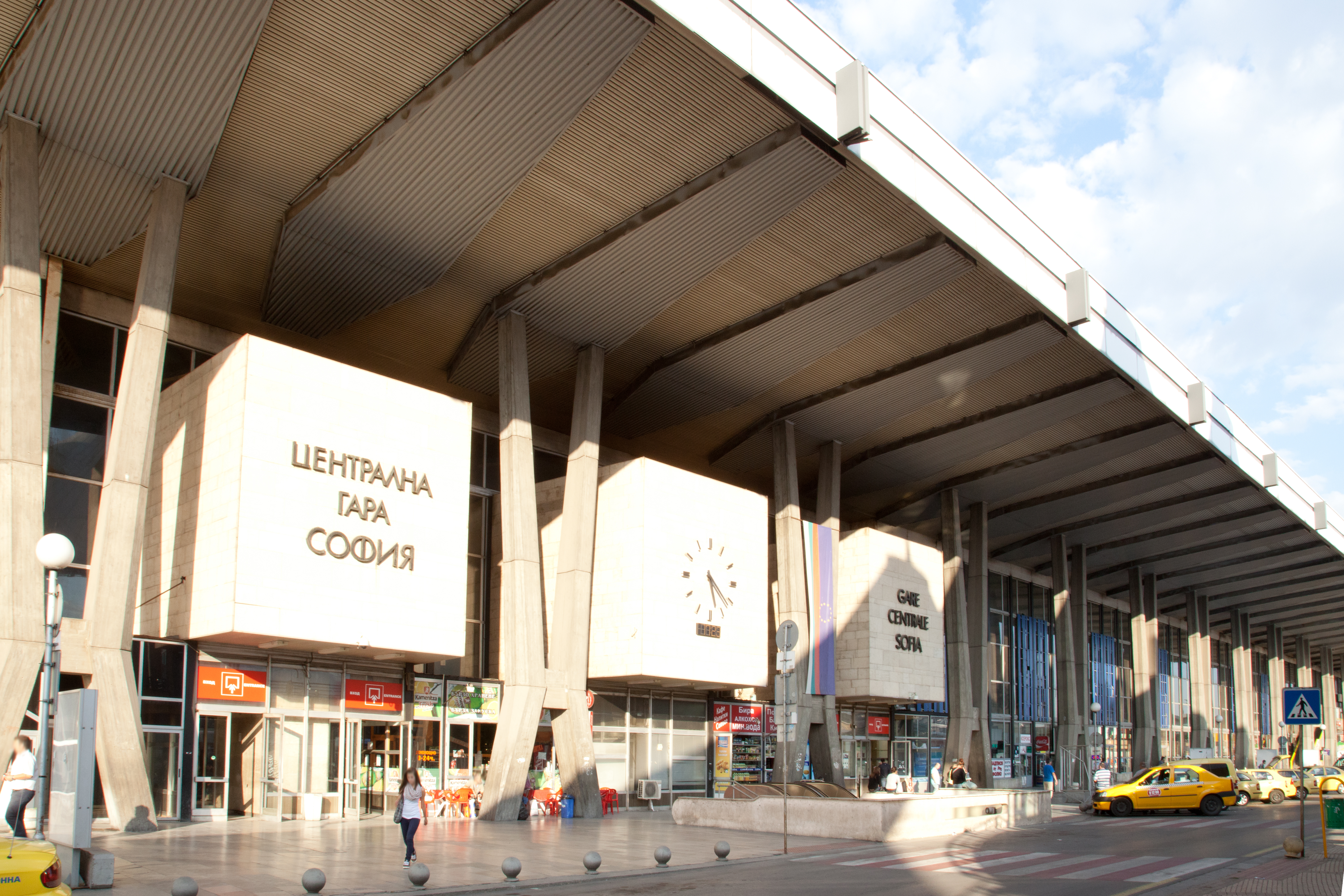
Sofia Central Station (1974), Bulgaria

- Festivalna (Felatival) Hall (1968), Sofia;
- Sofia Hall (1968), Sofia;
- Diplomatic Blocs (1973), Joliot Curie str., Sofia;
- Sofia Central Station, Sofia, Bulgaria (1974)
- Kambanite Monument (1979), Sofia;

National Palace of Culture (1981), Sofia, Bulgaria

- National Palace of Culture (1981), Sofia
- Buzludzha Monument, Balkan Mountains, Bulgaria (1981)
- Monument to 1300 Years of Bulgaria, Shumen (1981)
- Large aviary, bear area and other structures at the Sofia Zoo (1982);
- Sports complex "Cherveno zname” (Red Flag) (1985)
- Building 2 (“The Transistor”) of the International House of the Journalists, Varna.

=== Czech Republic ===
- See Brutalist architecture in the Czech Republic

=== Denmark ===
- Hans Christian Ørsted Institute, Copenhagen, Denmark, (Eva Koppel, 1955–1962)
- Technical University of Denmark, Kongens Lyngby, Denmark, (Eva Koppel, 1961–1975)
- Panum Institute, Copenhagen, Denmark (Eva Koppel, 1966–1986)

=== Estonia ===
- Linnahall, Tallinn, Estonia (Raine Karp, Riina Altmäe, 1975–1980)
- National Library of Estonia, Tallinn, Estonia (Raine Karp, 1985–1993)

=== France ===
East elevation Unité d'Habitation Marseille (La Cité Radieuse)

Brutalism in France emerged during post-World War II reconstruction. Facing an acute shortage of decent housing and severe material shortages after the war, France needed to rebuild a huge stock of destroyed infrastructure and housing. Le Corbusier’s completion of the Cité Radieuse in Marseille in 1952 démonstrated that concrete could be used to create functional "cities within a city." Throughout the 1960s and 1970s, the French government adopted the Brutalist approach for many of its state-sponsored projects, including social housing complexes (the grands ensembles), university facilities, administrative offices and other public buildings. However, by the late 1970s, the Brutalist movement began to lose momentum, due in part to its buildings’ rapid, physical deterioration and tendency to create ghettos. Despite this, several major Brutalist projects have received one of the two protected statuses given by the French Ministry of Culture.

- Unité d'Habitation de Marseille (Cité Radieuse), Marseille, France (Le Corbusier, 1952)
- Maisons Jaoul, Neuilly-sur-Seine, France (Le Corbusier, 1954–1956)
- UNESCO Headquarters, 7th arrondissement of Paris, (Bernard Zehrfuss (France), Marcel Breuer (Hungary), and Pier Luigi Nervi (Italy, inaugurated in 1958)
- Sainte Marie de La Tourette, Lyon, France (Le Corbusier and Iannis Xenakis, 1960)
- Église Saint-Jean-Baptiste de la Rechèvre, Chartres (Jean Redreau, completed 1962)
- Flaine, France. (Designed by Marcel Breuer, the entire assembly of hotels, shops, apartment blocks and administrative buildings of Flaine-Forum comprise a themed but varied entity), completed 1969
- Université Toulouse 1 Capitole, Toulouse (Georges Candilis, Alexis Josic, Shadrach Woods, completed 1970)
- Centre National de la Danse, Pantin (1972)

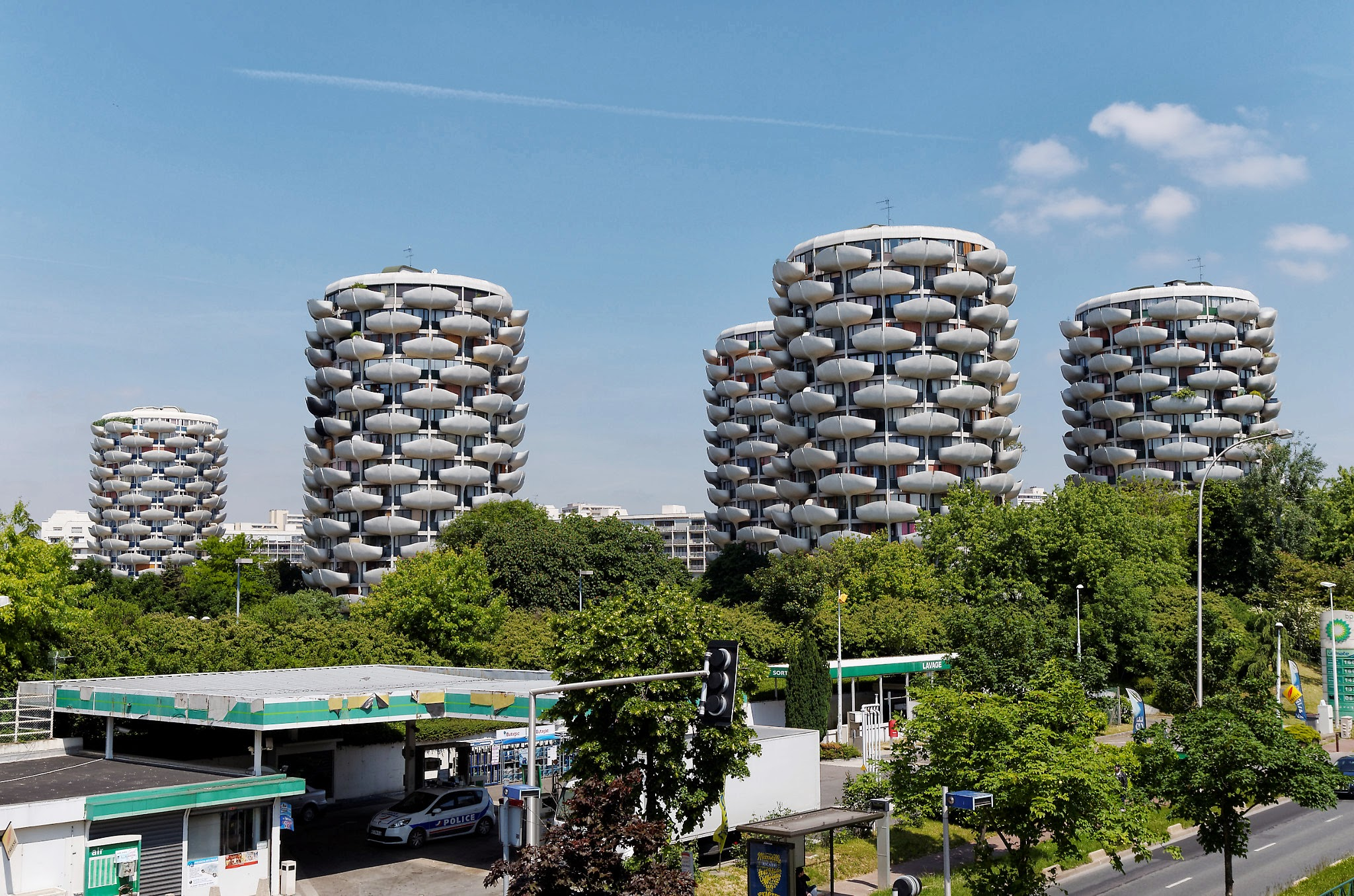
Five of the Choux de Créteil

- Les Choux de Créteil, Créteil (Gérard Grandval, completed 1974)
- Auditorium Maurice-Ravel, Lyon (1975)
- Bourse de Travail, Bobigny (Oscar Niemeyer, completed 1978)
- Headquarters of the French Communist Party,19th arrondissement of Paris (Oscar Niemeyer, inaugurated in 1971, but completed 1980)
- Orgues de Flandre, 19th arrondissement of Paris (fr:Martin van Treeck, completed 1980)
- Les Étoiles d'Ivry, Ivry-sur-Seine (Jean Renaudie and Renée Gailhoustet, completed 1981)
- Espace Oscar Niemeyer (Le Volcan), Le Havre, the complex includes the fr:Biibliothèque Oscar-Niemeyer (Oscar Niemeyer, completed 1982)
- Les Arènes de Picasso (fr:Arènes de Picasso), Noisy-le-Grand (fr:Manuel Nuñez Yanowsky, completed 1985)

=== Georgia ===
- Bank of Georgia headquarters, Tbilisi, Georgia (1975)

=== Germany ===
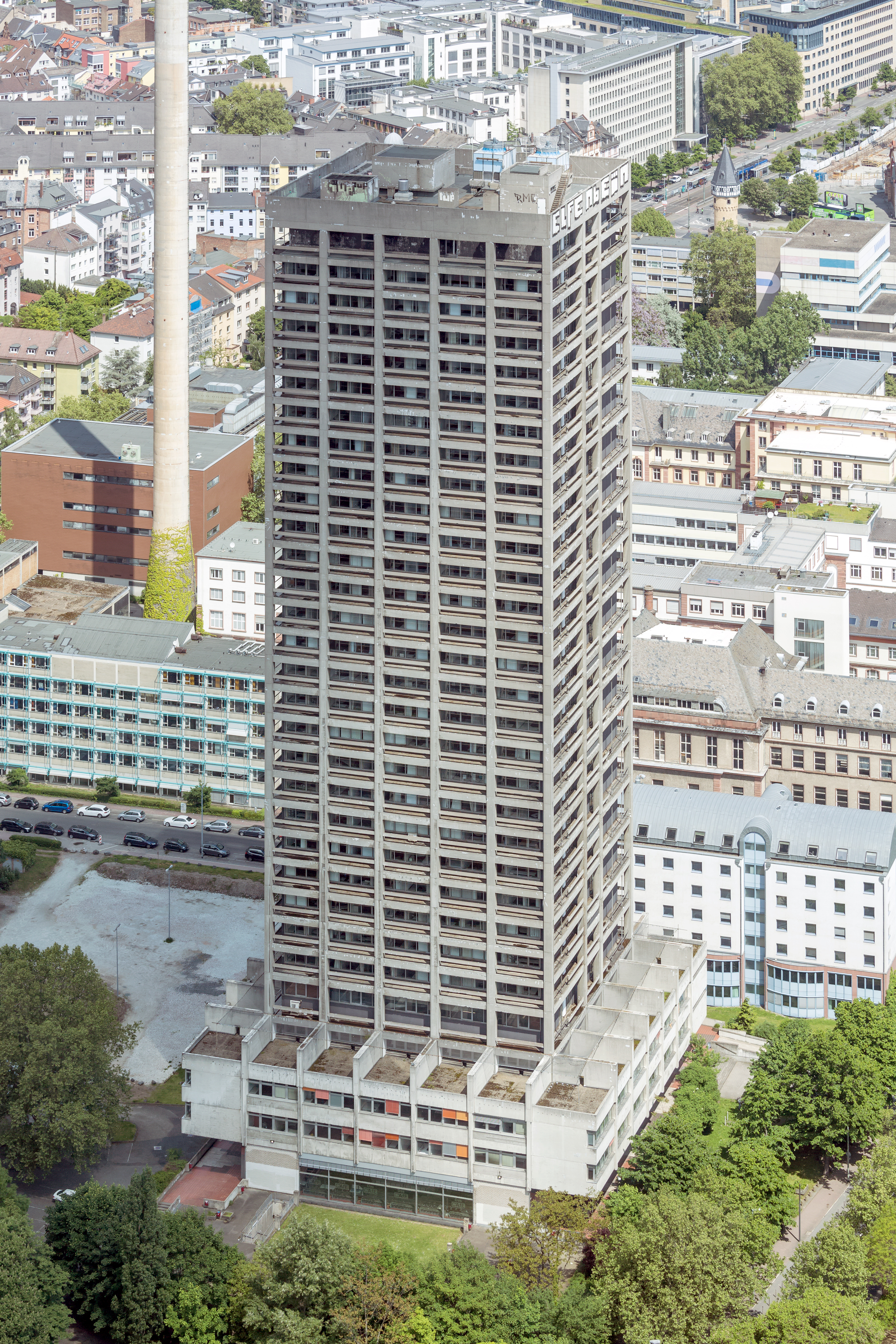
AfE-Turm, Frankfurt am Main

- Ruhr University Bochum, Germany (Hentrich, Petschnigg & Partner, 1964)
- University of Regensburg, Regensburg (1965)
- AfE-Turm, Frankfurt am Main (Staatliches Universitätsbauamt, Staatliche Neubauleitung Frankfurt, 1972) (demolished 2014)
- Friedenskirche, Monheim-Baumberg (1974)
- Main building of the University of Bielefeld, Bielefeld University, Bielefeld (1971–1976)
- Embassy of People's Republic of Czechoslovakia in Berlin, Germany (Věra and Vladimír Machonin, 1978)
- Research Institute for Experimental Medicine (Mouse Bunker, or Mäusebunker) Berlin, Germany (Gerd Hänska, Kurt Schmersow, Magdalena Hänska, 1971-1981)

=== Greece ===
- Broadcasting House (the headquarters of the Hellenic Broadcasting Corporation), Athens, Greece (1969)
- Porto Carras Resort, Chalkidiki, Greece (Walter Gropius, posthum built 1973)
- School of Theology, National and Kapodistrian University of Athens, Greece, L. Kalivites and G. Leonardos, 1976

=== Ireland ===
- Central Plaza, Dublin. Originally the Central Bank of Ireland Building (1978)
- Phibsborough Tower, Dublin

=== Italy ===
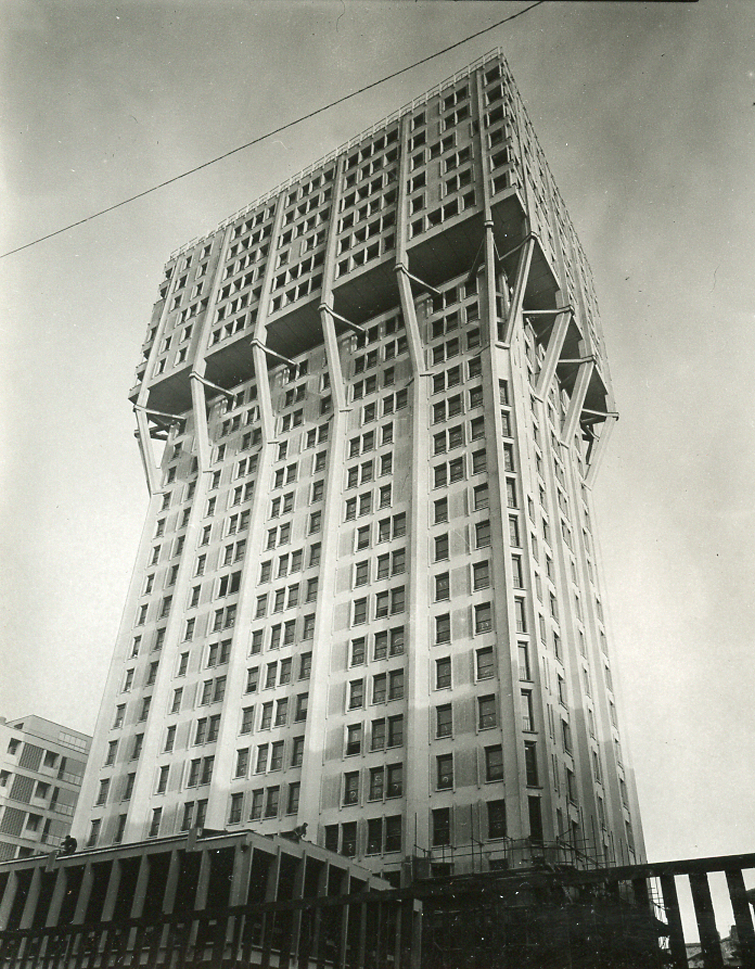
Torre Velasca, Milan

- Torre Velasca, Milan, Italy, (BBPR group 1954)
- Hotel DUPARC Contemporary Suites, Turin, Italy (Laura Petrazzini, 1971)
- Embassy of the United Kingdom, Rome, Italy, (Basil Spence, 1968)
- Nuovo Villaggio Matteotti, Terni, Italy (Giancarlo De Carlo, 1969-1974)

=== Latvia ===
- Salaspils Camp Memorial (Gunārs Asaris, Ivars Strautmanis, Oļģerts Ostenbergs, Oļegs Zakamennijs, 1959–1967)
- Laboratory Building of the Riga Diesel Factory, Ganību dambis 36 (Viktors Rimša and Eduards Geijers, 1985-1988)

=== Lithuania ===
- Seimas Palace (1980)

=== Moldova ===
- Moldova National Opera Ballet, Chișinău, Moldova (1980)
- Moldova Presidential Residence, Chișinău, Moldova (1987)

=== Poland ===
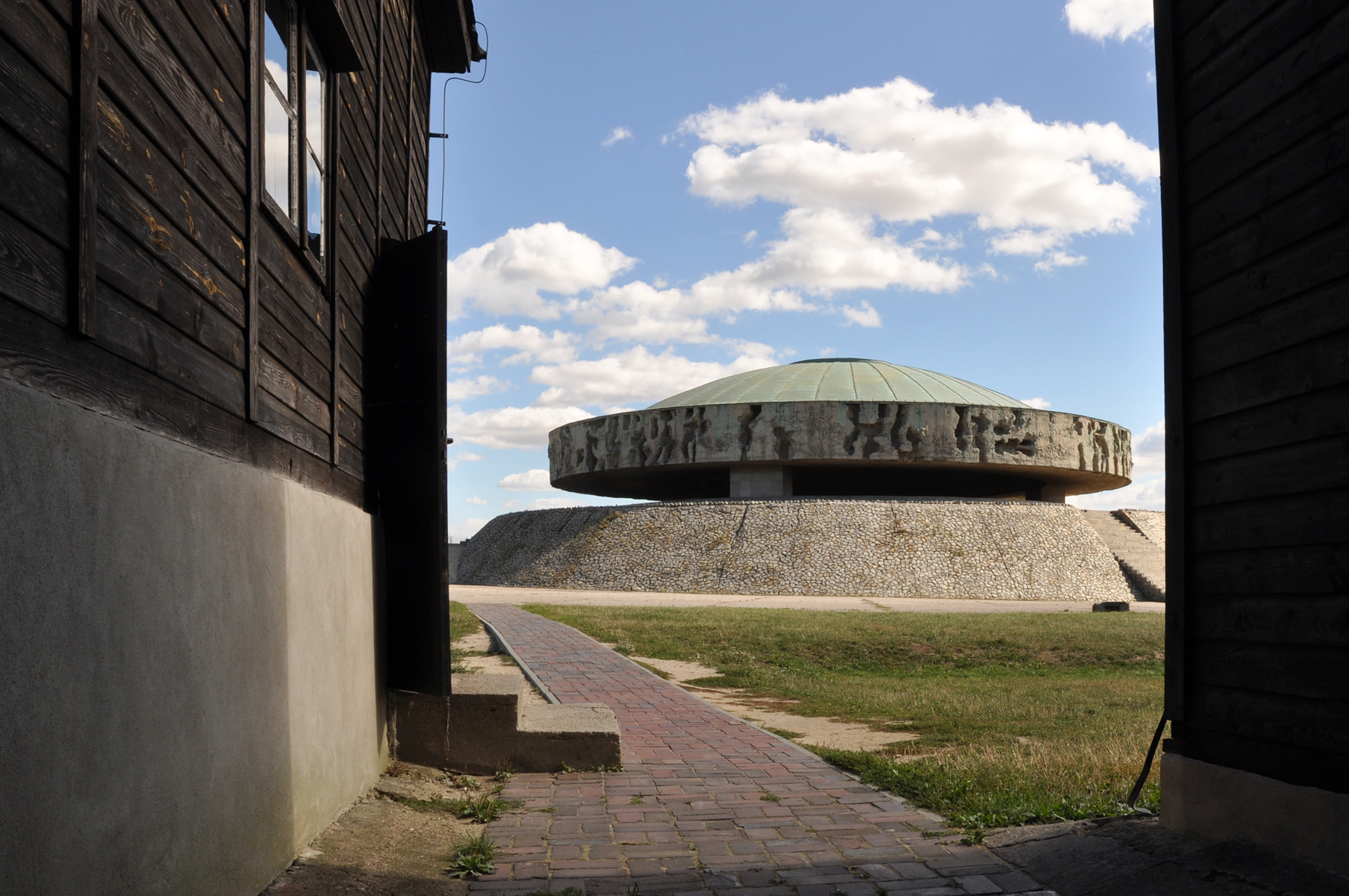
Majdanek concentration camp, Poland

- 'Młotek' residential building, 8 Smolna Street in Warsaw, Poland (1964, by Jan Bogusławski, Bohdan Gniewiewski)
- Bunkier Sztuki gallery, Kraków, Poland (Krystyna Tołłoczko-Różyska, Antoni Hajdecki, 1965)
- Mausoleum of the Majdanek concentration camp, Poland (Wiktor Tołkin, Janusz Dembek, 1969)
- Spodek, Katowice, Poland (1971)
- Katowice railway station, Katowice, Poland (Wacław Kłyszewski, Jerzy Mokrzyński and Eugeniusz Wierzbicki a.k.a. "The Tigers", 1972)
- Hala Olivia, Gdańsk, Poland (1972)
- Forest Hotel (former Jagiellonian University guesthouse; Tomasz Mańkowski and Dariusz Kozłowski, 1976-1991)
- Forum Hotel, Kraków, Poland (Janusz Ingarden, 1978–1989)
- Church of the Exaltation of the Holy Cross and Our Lady of Health of the Sick in Katowice, Poland (Henryk Buszko, Aleksander Franta, (1991)

=== Portugal ===
- Palace of Justice, Lisbon, Portugal (Januário Godinho and João Andresen, 1970)
- Casino Park Hotel, Funchal, Portugal (Oscar Niemeyer and Viana de Lima, 1976)

=== Romania ===
Bucharest National Theatre in its form from 1983 to 2012

- Administrative Palace, Satu Mare, Romania (Nicolae Porumbescu, 1984)
- TVR Tower, Bucharest, Romania (Calea Dorobanților, 1968)
- Grand Hotel, Bucharest, Romania (Nicolae Bălcescu 4, 1971)
- National Theatre Bucharest, Romania (Nicolae Bălcescu 2, 1973)
- Building of Politehnica University of Bucharest, Bucharest, Romania (Splaiul Independenței 313, 1969)
- Romano-Catholic church from Orșova, Orșova, Romania (1970)

=== Russia ===
- RIA Novosti headquarter, former press-center of 1980 Summer Olympics, Moscow, (1976–1979)
- TASS building, Moscow, V. S. Egerev, (1977)
- House of Soviets (Kaliningrad), (1985)

=== Serbia ===
- Novobeogradski blokovi (Blocks 22, 23, 28, 30, 61, 62, 63), Belgrade, Serbia (1948–1990)
- Museum of Yugoslavia, Belgrade, Serbia (1962)
- Toblerone building, Belgrade, Serbia (1963)
- Avala Tower, Belgrade, Serbia (1965; 2009)
- New Belgrade town hall, Belgrade, Serbia (1967)
- 25 May Sportcenter, Belgrade, Serbia (1975)
- Eastern City Gate, Belgrade, Serbia (1976)
- County Court, Požarevac, Serbia (1976)
- Western City Gate, Belgrade, Serbia (1977)
- County Court, Sremska Mitrovica (1979)
- Zlatibor Hotel, Užice, Serbia (1981)

=== Slovakia ===
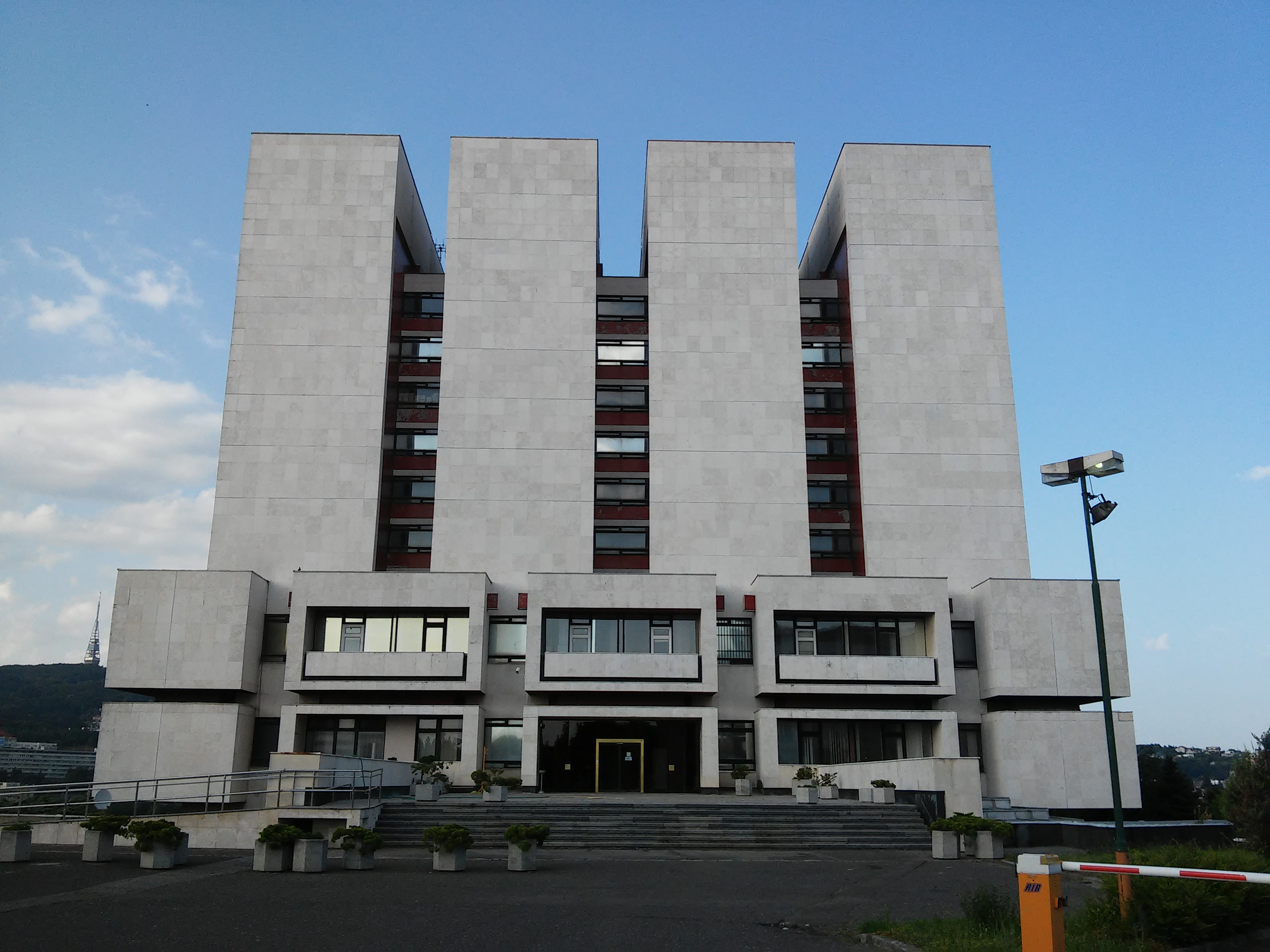
Slovak National Archives headquarters

- Bridge of the Slovak National Uprising, Bratislava (1972)
- Incheba, Bratislava (1995)
- Slovak National Archives, Bratislava (1983)
- Slovak Radio Building, Bratislava (1983)
- Slovak Television Building, Bratislava (1974)

=== Spain ===
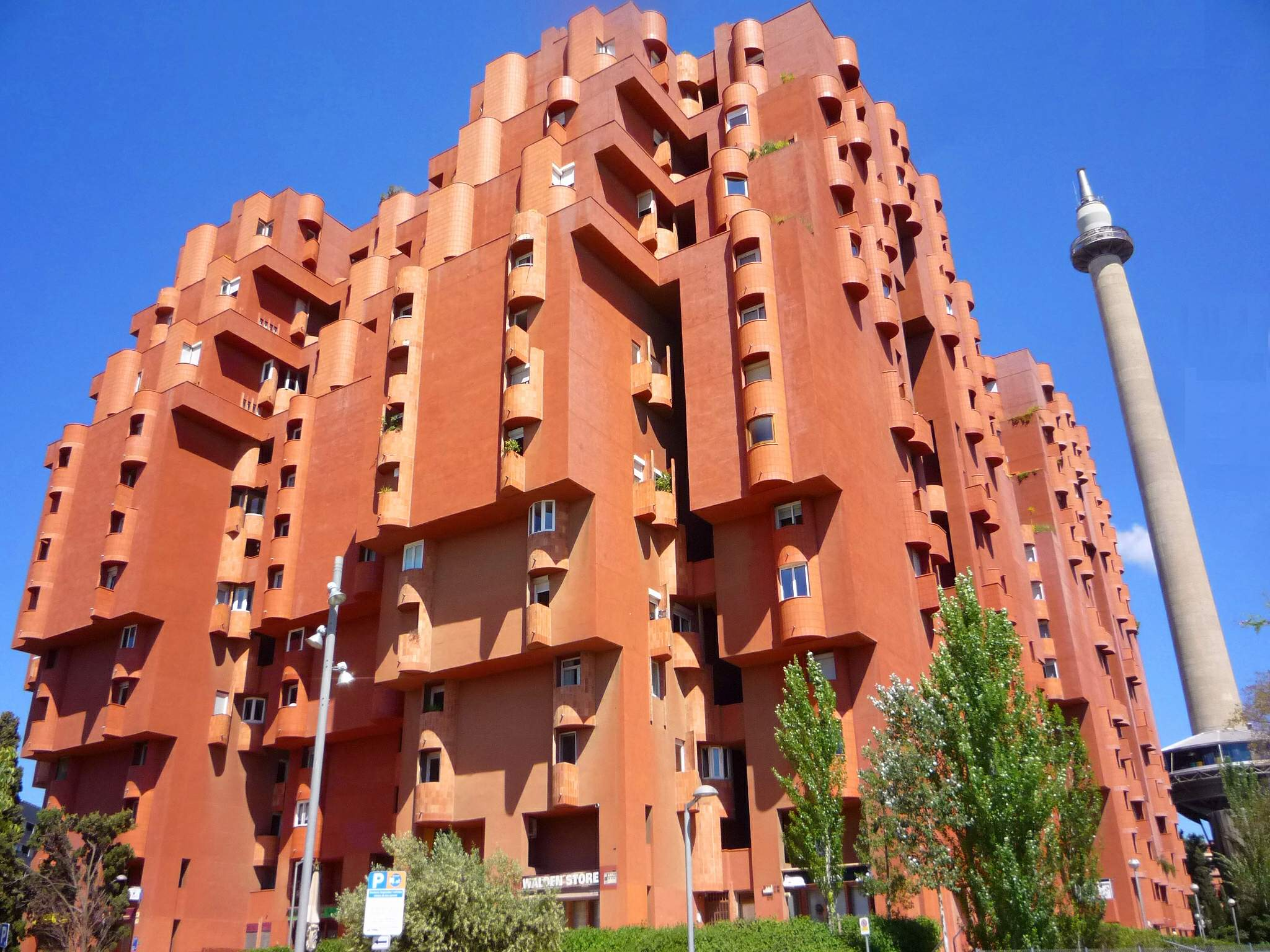
Walden 7 building, Sant Just Desvern - Barcelona

- Torres Blancas, Madrid, Spain (1968)
- Facultades de Ciencias Biológicas y Geológicas (Universidad Complutense de Madrid), Madrid (Francisco Fernández Longoria, 1965–1968)
- Walden 7 building, Sant Just Desvern - Barcelona, Spain (Ricardo Bofill, 1975)
- Facultad de Ciencias de la Información (Universidad Complutense de Madrid), Madrid, (José María Laguna Martínez and Juan Castañón Fariña, 1979)

=== Sweden ===
- City Library, Norrköping, (Sten Samuelsson, 1971)
- Villa Göth, Uppsala, Sweden (Bengt Edman and Lennart Holm, 1950)

=== Switzerland ===
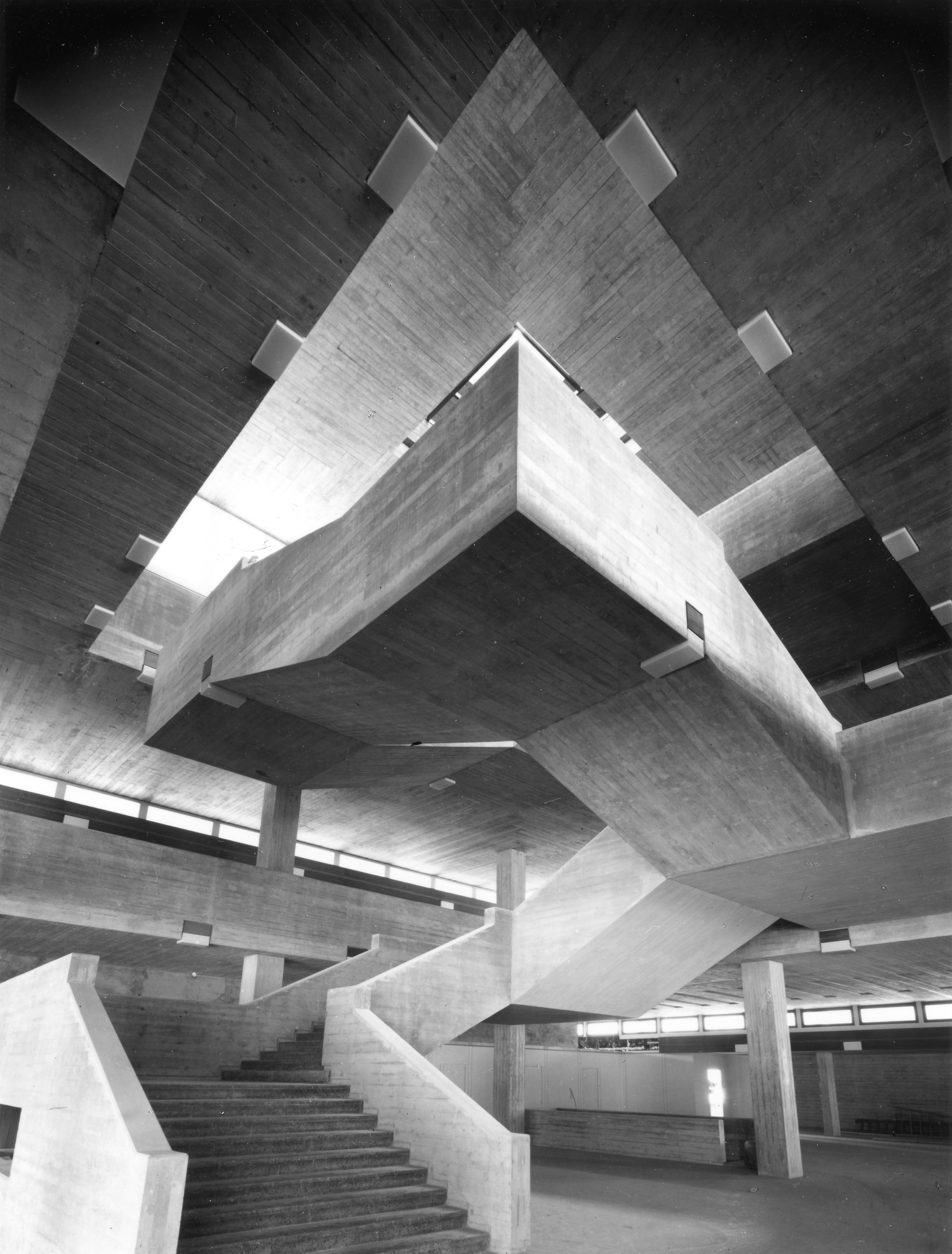
Staircase in the center of the main building of the University of St. Gallen, 1963

- University of St. Gallen Campus Rosenberg, St. Gallen (Walter Maria Förderer, 1957–1963)
- Therme Vals Spa Building, Vals, Switzerland (Peter Zumthor, 1993–1996)
- Swiss Medical Research Foundation (La Tulipe), Geneva (Jack Bertoli, 1976)
- Villa Dominik von Streng, Hitzligen, Mauensee, ([Georges-Pierre Dubois, 1963-1964])

=== Turkey ===
- Abdi İpekçi Arena, İstanbul (Ragıp Buluç, Ziya Tanalı and Ercan Yener, 1978–1989)
- Atatürk Cultural Center, İstanbul (Tabanlıoğlu Architects, 1956–1969)
- Hilton Istanbul Bosphorus (Skidmore, Owings and Merrill, Sedat Hakkı Eldem and Gordon Bunshaft, 1951–1955)
- Turkish Historical Society Main Building, Ankara (Turgut Cansever and Ertur Yener, 1951–1967)
- Middle East Technical University Campus, Ankara (Behruz and Altuğ Çinici, 1961–1964)

=== United Kingdom ===
==== England ====
Many of the notable surviving brutalist buildings in England are listed on the National Heritage List for England. Inclusion on the list is based on a building's "special architectural and historic interest", with "particularly careful selection required" for buildings constructed after 1945 (i.e. all brutalist structures). There are three grades of listed building: grade I for buildings "of exceptional interest", grade II* for "particularly important buildings of more than special interest" and grade II for buildings "of special interest". Buildings may also be locally listed by planning authorities as non-designated heritage assets. Buildings may also be granted a certificate of immunity from listing for a period of five years, allowing a building to be developed or demolished in the knowledge that it will not be subject to listing in that period. A certificate of immunity was issued for the Robin Hood Gardens Estate in 2009 and then again in 2015, prior to its demolition in 2017, after Historic England determined that it "[did] not meet the very high threshold for listing". Listing has not always prevented the demolition of buildings, such as Imperial College London's Southside Halls of Residence that was demolished in 2005 after the university presented structural engineers' reports – disputed by reports from other structural engineers – that the building was failing and could not be repaired.

- Smithdon High School, Norfolk, Alison and Peter Smithson (1950–54); grade II* listed
- Dorman Long tower, Redcar (1955–56); Emergency listing granted 10 September 2021, revoked by new secretary of state on 16 September 2021, demolished 18 September 2021.
- Langham House Close, James Stirling and James Gowan (1957–58); grade II* listed
- Department of Architecture extension, University of Cambridge, Colin St John Wilson and Alex Hardy with participation by students at the university (1959); grade II listed
- Weeks Hall, Imperial College London, Sheppard Robson and Partners (1957–58); grade II listed
- Park Hill, Sheffield, Ivor Smith & Jack Lynn (1957–60); grade II* listed
- The Beehives, St John's College, Oxford, Michael Powers of Architects' Co-Partnership (1958–60); grade II listed
- Crescent House Golden Lane Estate, London, Chamberlin, Powell and Bon (1958–62); grade II* listed
- Falmer House, University of Sussex, Basil Spence (1960–62); grade I listed, and surrounding university buildings, Basil Spence (1956–71); grade II* listed
- Ringway Centre, Birmingham, James Roberts (1962); set for demolition as of 2023.
- Eros House, Catford, Owen Luder (1960–63)

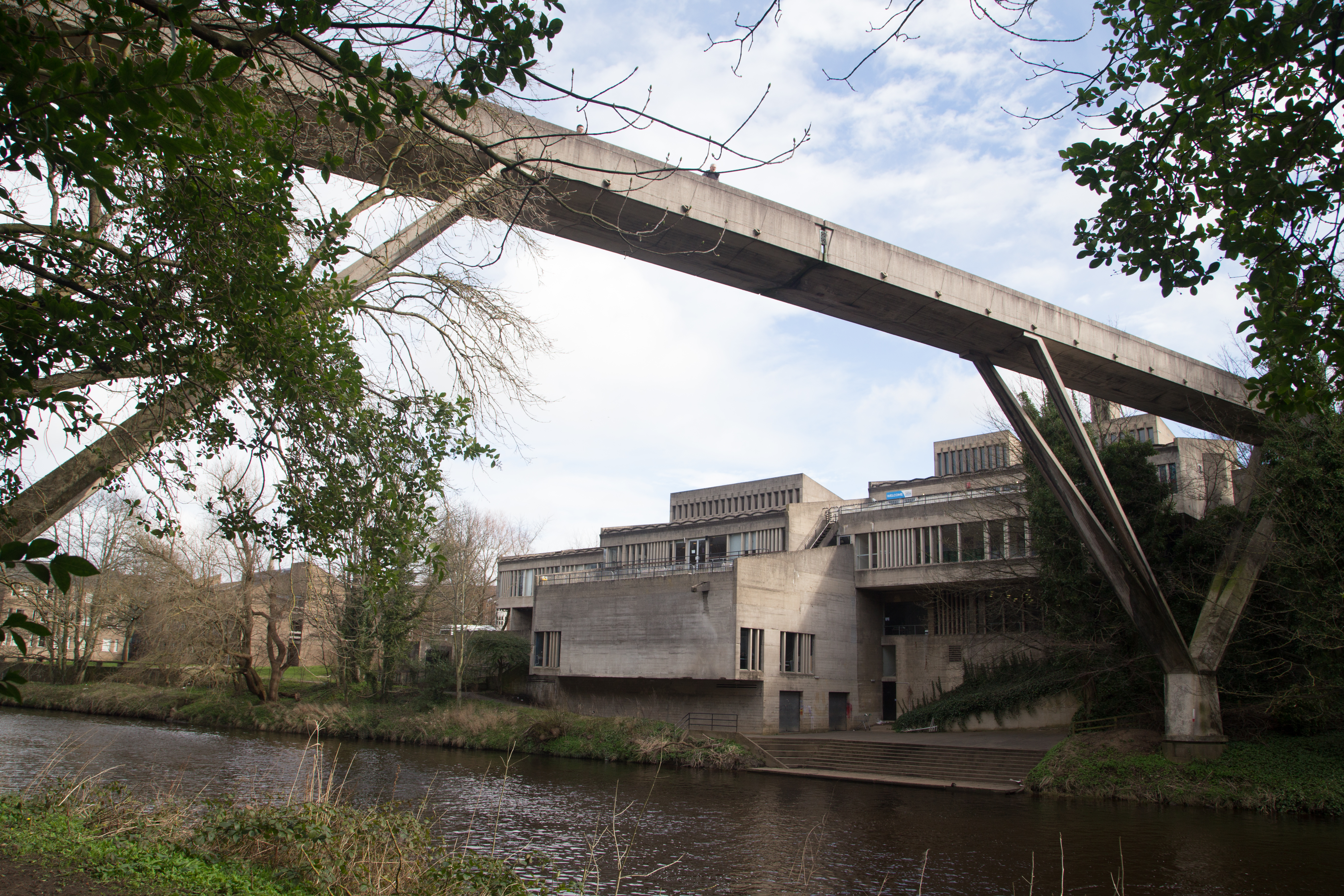
Kingsgate Bridge and Dunelm House, Durham, United Kingdom

- Kingsgate Bridge, Durham, Ove Arup (1963); grade I listed
- Southside Halls of Residence, Imperial College London, Sheppard Robson (1963); grade II listed but demolished 2005
- St Aidan's College, Durham, Sir Basil Spence (1960–1964); locally listed
- The Economist group buildings, Alison and Peter Smithson (1960–64); grade II* listed
- Birmingham New Street Signal Box, Birmingham, Bicknell & Hamilton (1964); grade II listed
- Tricorn Centre, Portsmouth, Owen Luder (1964); Demolished in 2004
- Bull Ring Centre, Birmingham, (1964); Demolished in 2000
- Piccadilly Plaza, Manchester, Covell Matthews and Partners (1959–1965)
- Brighton and Hove National Spiritualist Church, Brighton, Bev Pike of Overton and Partners (1964–65)
- Dunelm House, Durham Students' Union, Richard Raines of Architects' Co-Partnership (1964–66); grade II listed
- Hendon Hall Court, Owen Luder (1966)
- Buckinghamshire County Hall, Aylesbury, Frederick B. Pooley (1966)
- New County Hall, Truro, Francis Kenneth Hicklin & Alan J. Groves (1966); grade II listed
- Balfron Tower, London, Ernő Goldfinger (1965–1967); grade II* listed
- Stoke Newington School, Hackney, Stillman & Eastwick-Field Partnership (1967)
- Brunel University Lecture Centre, Uxbridge, Richard Sheppard, Robson and Partners (1965–66); grade II listed
- Churchill College, Cambridge, Sheppard Robson and Partners (1961–1968); grade II listed

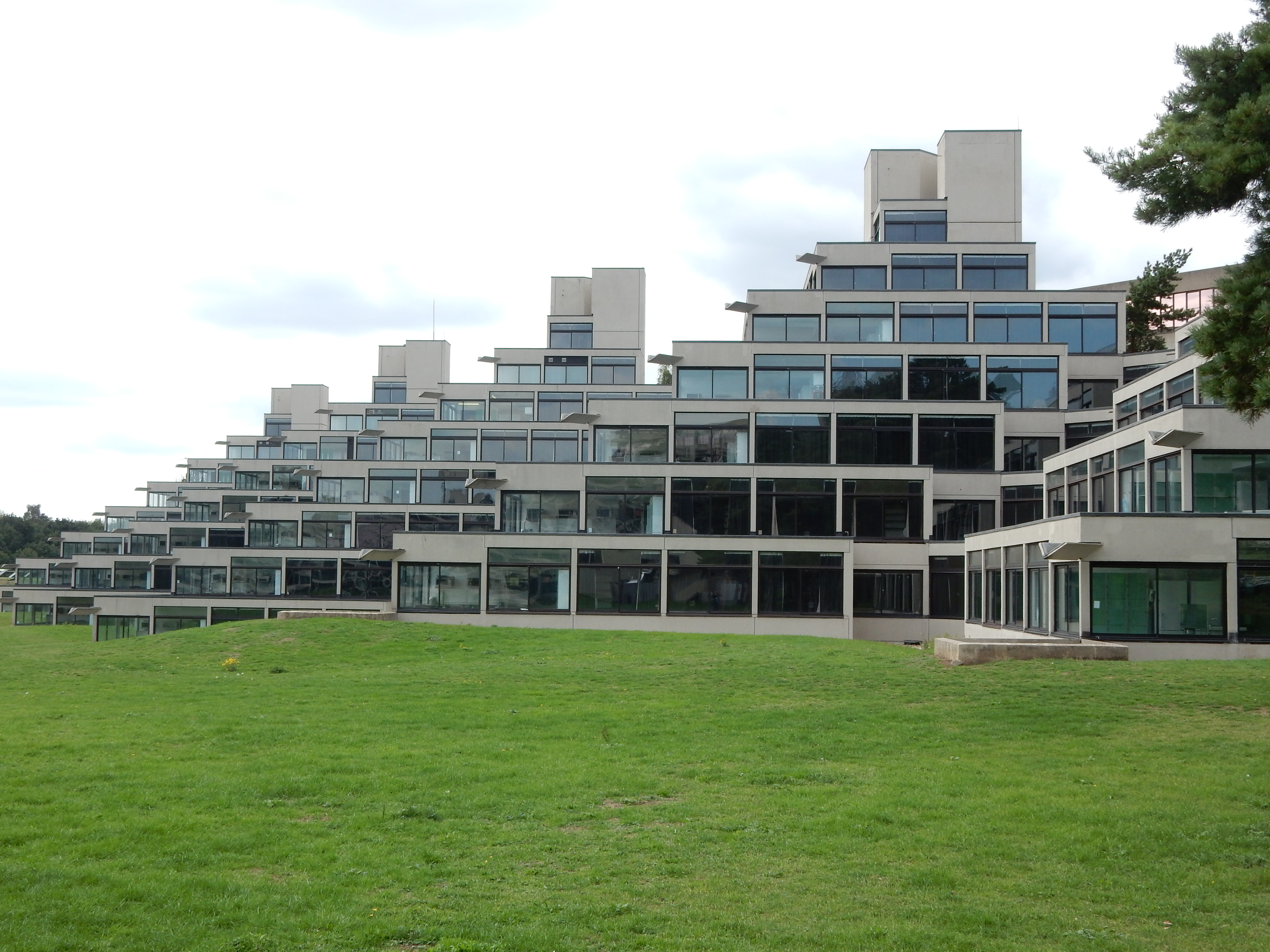
Denys Lasdun's 'ziggurats' (1968), University of East Anglia

- The 'ziggurats' at the University of East Anglia, Norwich, Sir Denys Lasdun (1964–68); grade II* listed

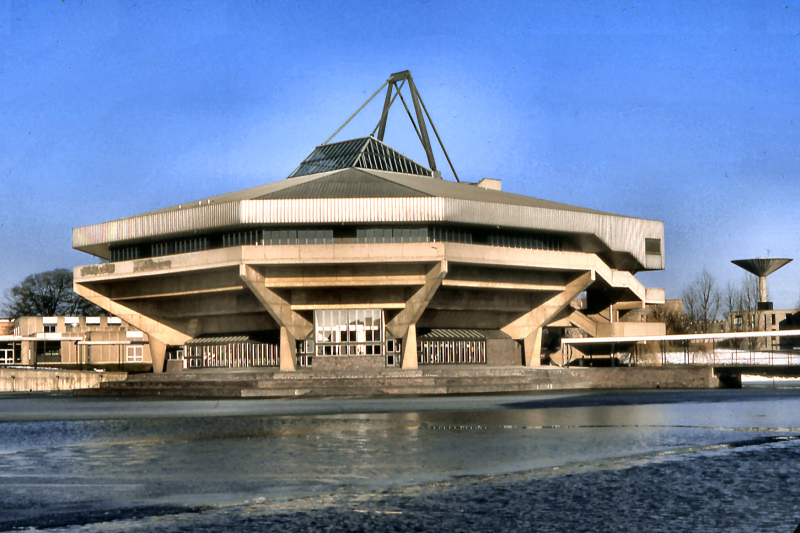
Central Hall, University of York

- Central Hall and Derwent College at the University of York, Robert Matthew, Johnson-Marshall & Partners (1962–68); all grade II listed
- University of Essex, Main campus complex, Kenneth Capon of Architects' Co-Partnership (1964–1968)
- Southbank Centre (Queen Elizabeth Hall, Purcell Room and Hayward Gallery), London, Hubert Bennett & Jack Whittle (1967–68); certificate of immunity from listing issued 2020, expired 2025; recommended for listing on five occasions since 1991 but rejected; listed as grade II in 2026.
- Mathematics Tower, Manchester, Scherrer & Hicks (1968); Demolished in 2005
- Finsbury Estate, London (1968)

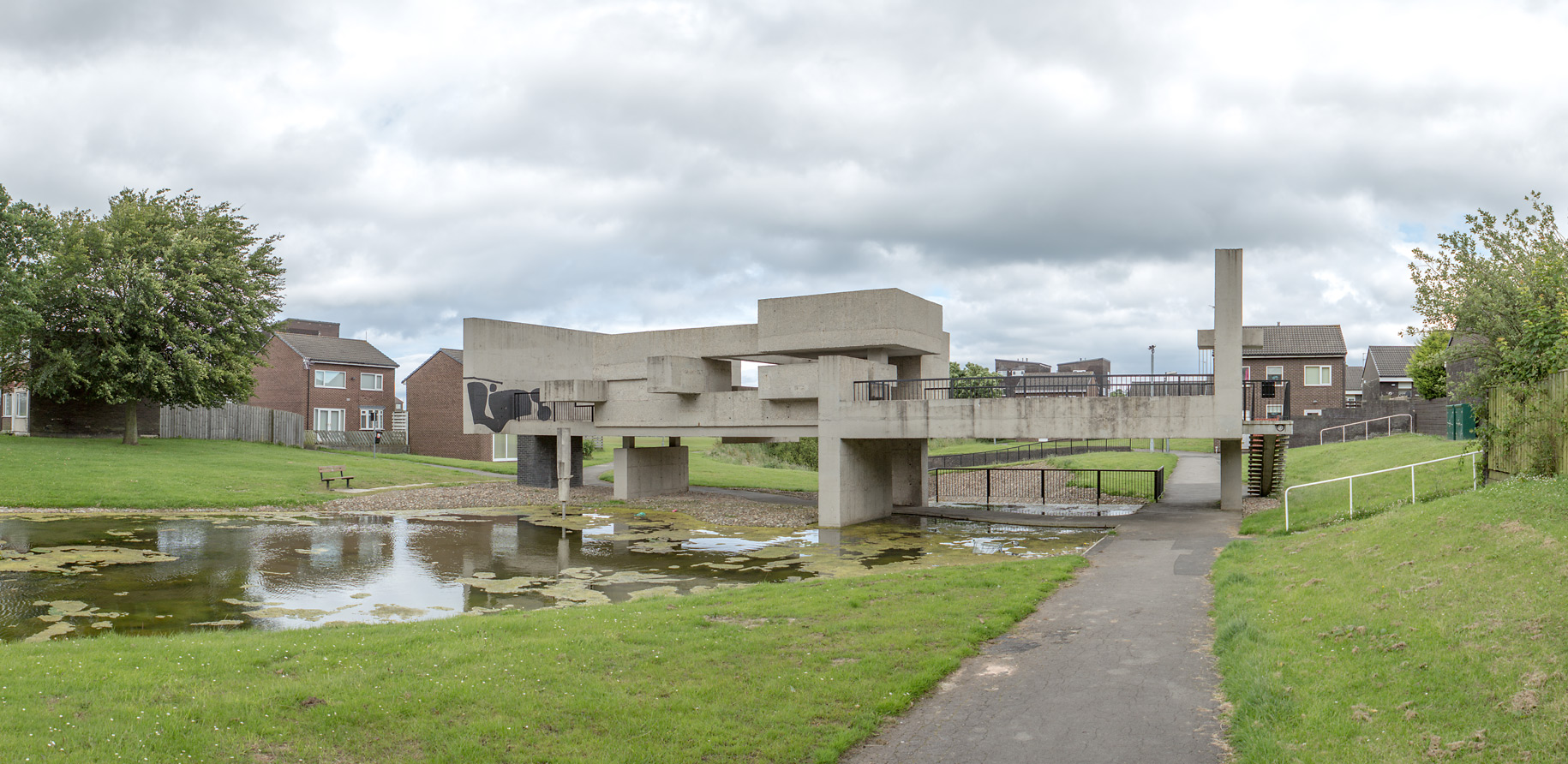
Apollo Pavilion

- Apollo Pavilion, Peterlee, Victor Pasmore (1968), grade II listed
- South Norwood Library near Croydon, Surrey (1968)
- Garden building, St Hilda's College, Oxford, Alison and Peter Smithson (1968); grade II listed
- Middleton Grange Shopping Centre, Hartlepool (1969)
- Wyndham Court, Southampton (1969) grade II* listed

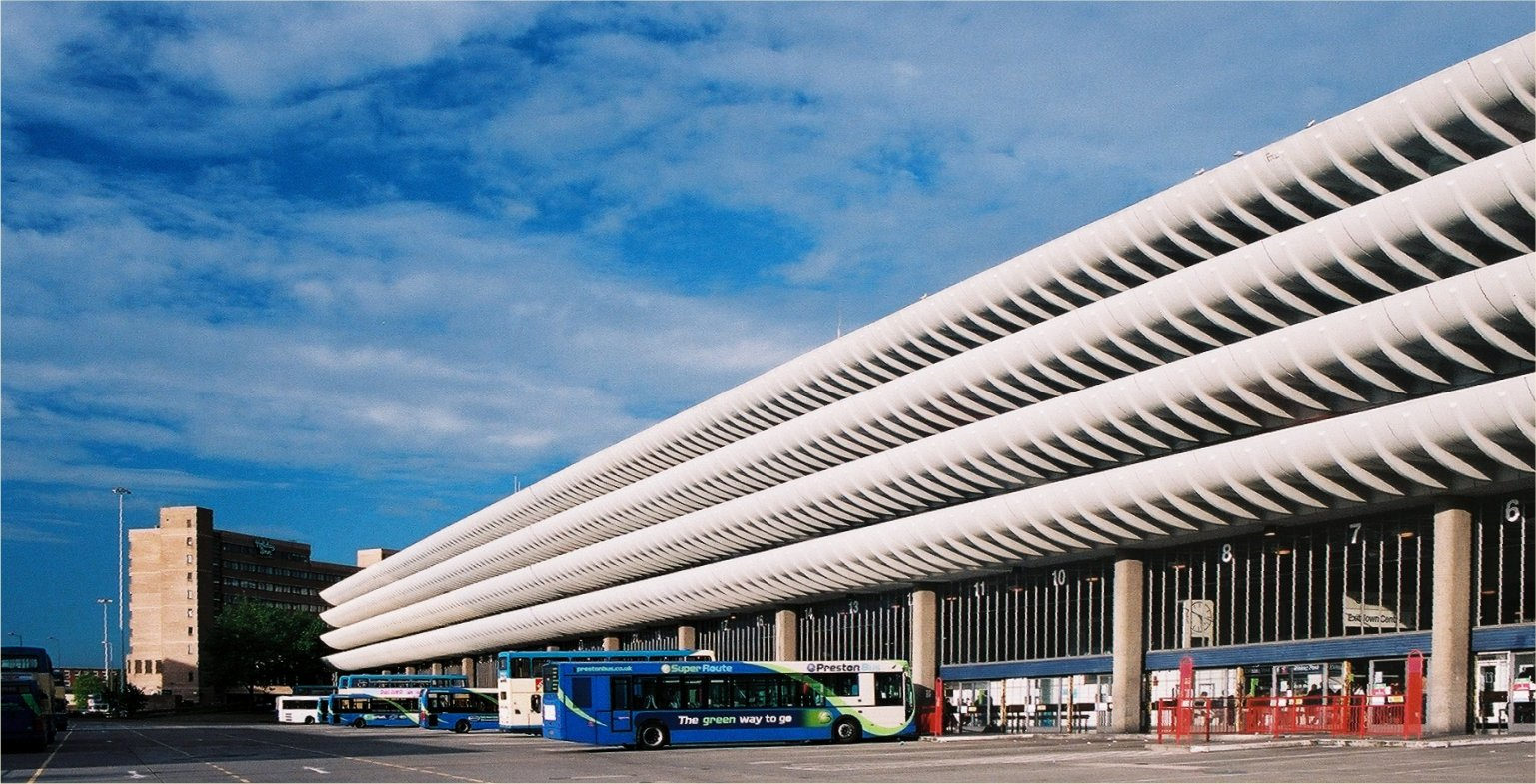
Preston bus station, United Kingdom

- Preston bus station, Preston, Keith Ingham & Charles Wilson (1968–1969); grade II listed
- The Trinity Centre Multi-Storey Car Park, a.k.a. The Get Carter Carpark, Gateshead, Owen Luder (1964–1969); Demolished in 2010
- Tyne Bridge Tower, Gateshead (1960s); Demolished in 2010
- Extension to Chartered Accountants' Hall, William Whitfield (1966–70); grade II* listed
- Pimlico School, London, John Bancroft (1967–1970); Demolished in 2010
- Leeds International Pool, Leeds, John Poulson (1970); Demolished in 2009
- Roger Stevens Building, University of Leeds, Chamberlin, Powell and Bon (1970); grade II* listed
- Hyde Park Barracks, London, Sir Basil Spence (1970); listing refused 2015
- Denys Wilkinson Building, Oxford, Philip Dowson (1963–71); recommendation for listing declined in 2015.
- Pebble Mill Studios, Birmingham, John Madin (1971); Demolished in 2005

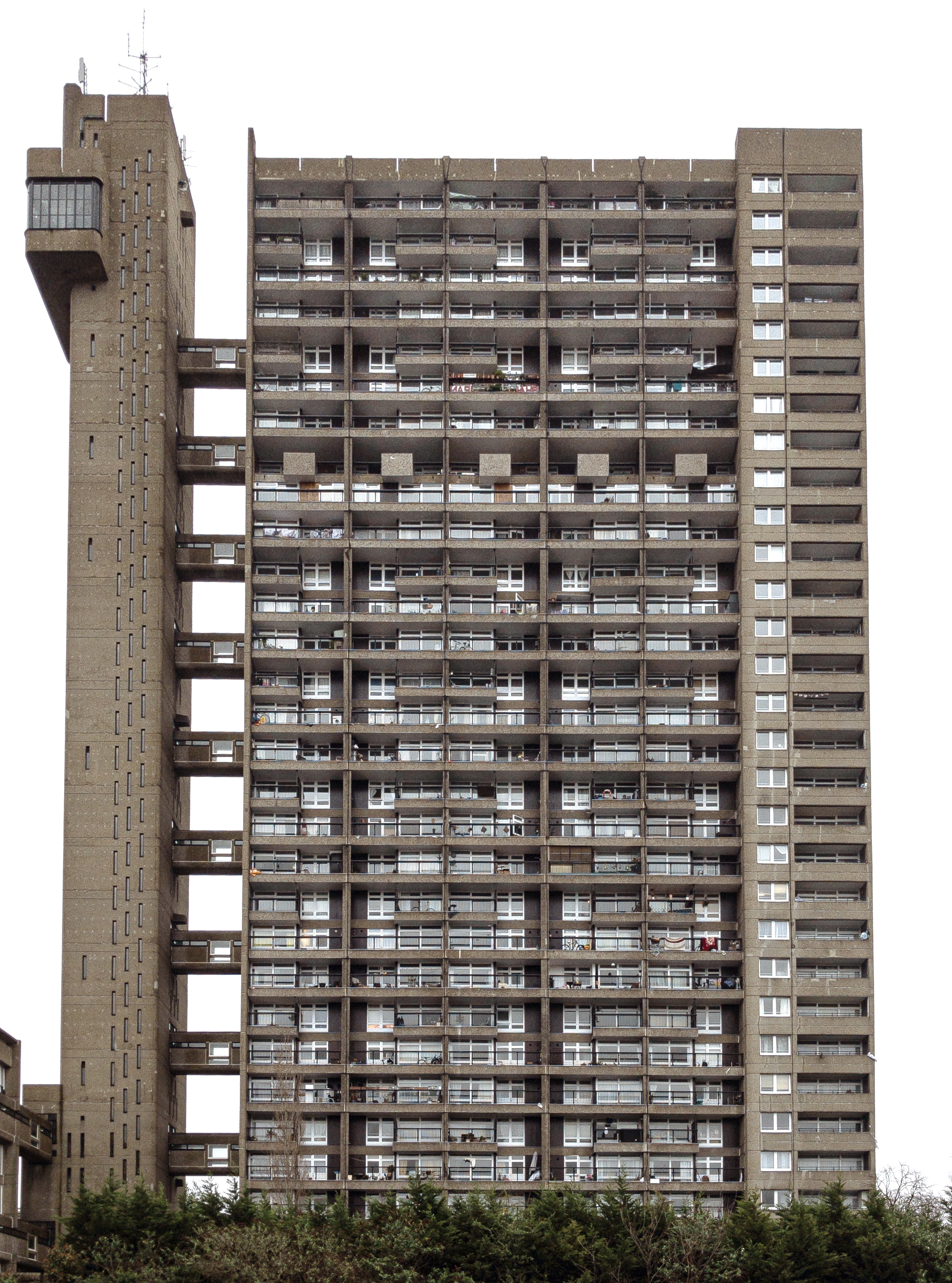
Trellick Tower, London

- Trellick Tower, London, Ernő Goldfinger (1968–1972); grade II* listed
- Blackheath Quaker Meeting House, London, Trevor Dannatt (1971–72); grade II listed
- High Point, Bradford, John Brunton Partnership (1972)
- Princes Hall, Aldershot, Hampshire, Building Design Partnership (1972)
- Robin Hood Gardens, London, Peter & Alison Smithson (1972); Demolished in 2017
- Westgate House, Newcastle Upon Tyne, Tyne & Wear (1972); Demolished in 2007
- School of Oriental and African Studies Philips Building, London, Sir Denys Lasdun (1973); grade II* listed
- Clifton Cathedral, Bristol, Ronald Weeks, E S Jennett and Antoni Poremba of the Percy Thomas Partnership (1969–1973); grade II* listed
- Titan House, The Northern School of Art, Hartlepool (1974)
- Birmingham Central Library, Birmingham, John Madin (1974); Demolished in 2015
- Grenfell Tower, London (1974); Currently shrouded post fire, awaiting outcome of investigation
- New Hall Place, Liverpool (1974)
- Guy's Hospital Tower, Southwark, London, Watkins Gray (1974)
- The Barbican Estate, London, Chamberlin, Powell and Bon (1964–1975); grade II listed
- Pollen wing, Downside Abbey, Francis Pollen (1970–75); grade II* listed
- 50 Queen Anne's Gate, Ministry of Justice), London, Fitzroy Robinson & Partners with Basil Spence (1976)
- Royal National Theatre, London, (Sir Denys Lasdun (1969–76)
- Greyfriars bus station, Northampton (1976); Demolished in 2015
- Institute of Education building, London, Sir Denys Lasdun (1970–76); grade II* listed
- Brighton Centre, Brighton (1977)
- Alexandra Road Estate, London, Neave Brown of Camden Architects' Department (1972–78); grade II* listed
- Sampson House, Southwark, London, Fitzroy Robinson & Partners (1979); Demolished in 2018
- Woking Civic Offices, Woking, Surrey (1983)

==== Northern Ireland ====
- Ulster Museum, Botanic Gardens, Belfast, (1964–1972)

==== Scotland ====
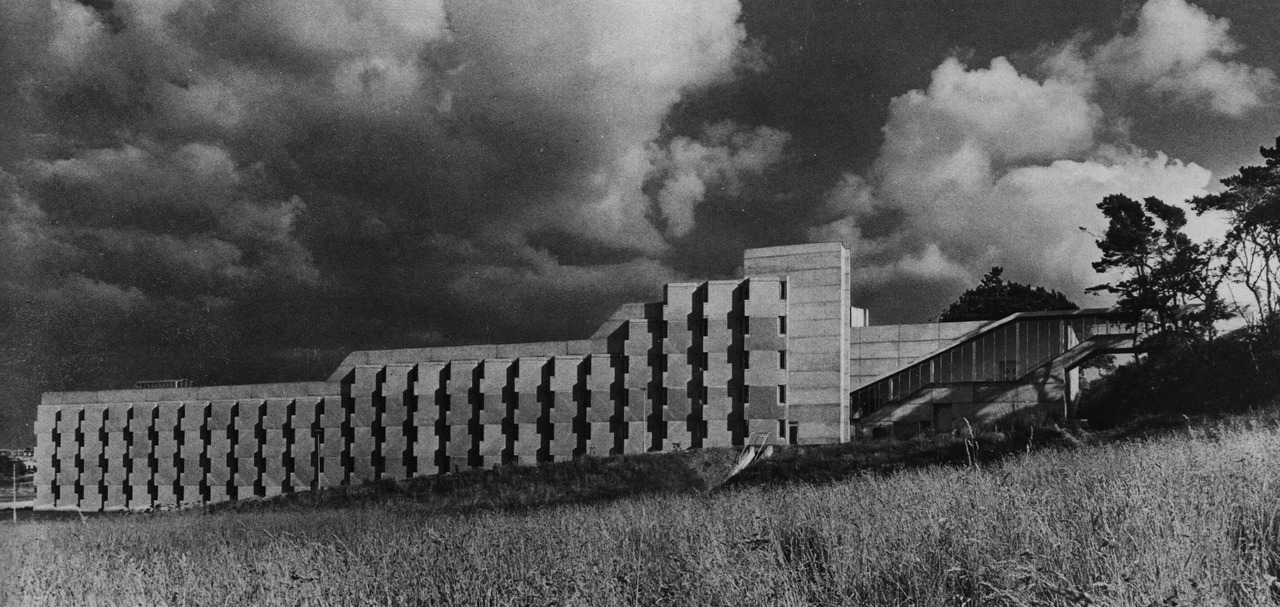
Andrew Melville Hall at the University of St Andrews

As in England, many surviving brutalist buildings are listed by Historic Environment Scotland. Scotland uses a different listing system from England and Wales, with three categories for "buildings of special architectural or historic interest": A for "outstanding examples of a particular period, style or building type", B for "major examples" and C for "representative examples".

- Perth Telephone Exchange, Perth (HM Office of Works, 1957-60); category C listed
- Hudson Beare Lecture Theatre, University of Edinburgh King's Buildings, Edinburgh (Robert Gardner-Medwin and Kingham Knight Associates, 1960); category B listed
- Cables Wynd House, Leith (1962); category A listed

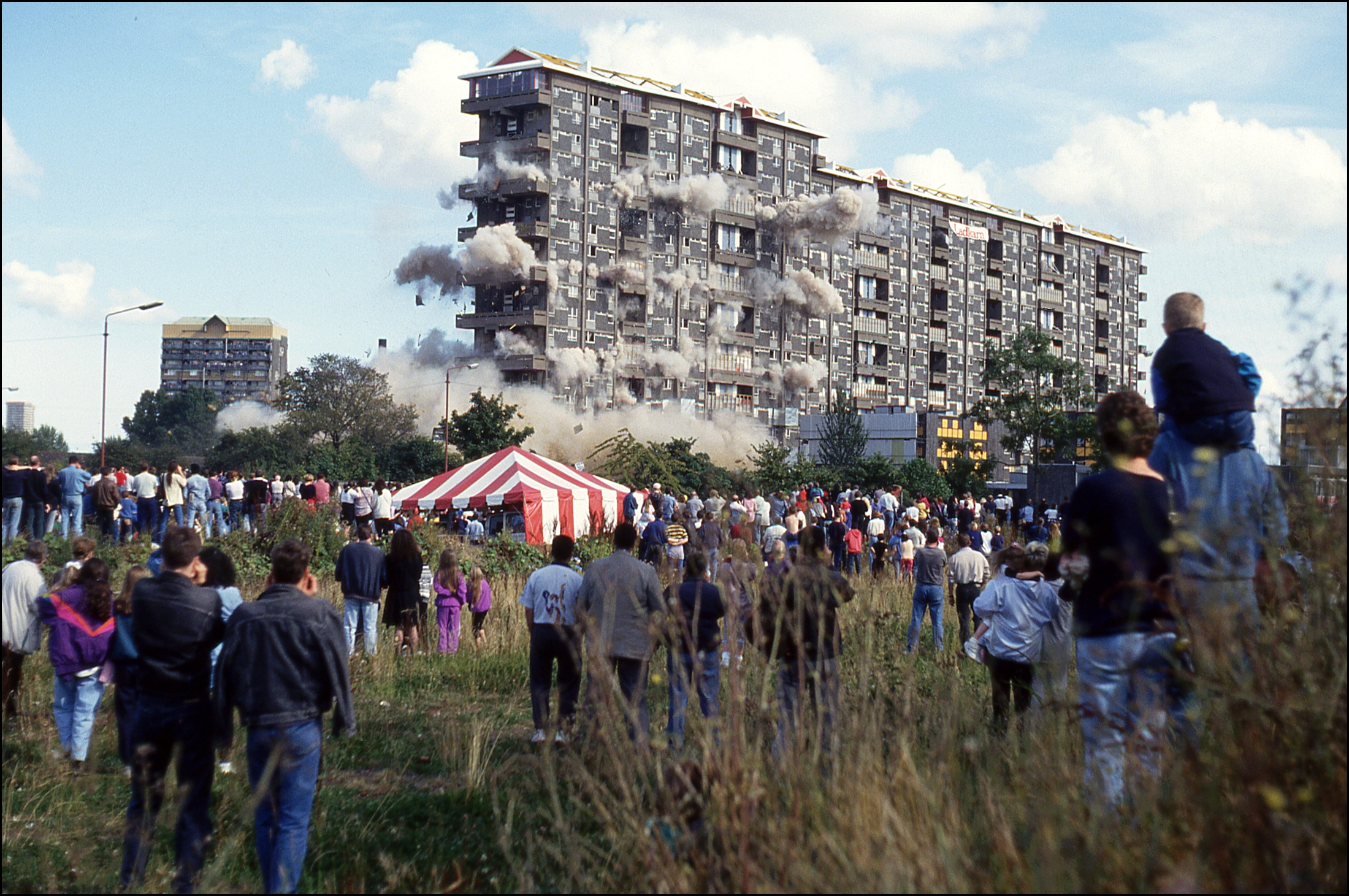
The Hutchesontown C (1962) in Glasgow being demolished in 1993

- Hutchesontown C multi-storey housing, Glasgow (Basil Spence, 1962); Demolished in 1993.
- Gilcomstoun Land, Aberdeen (Aberdeen City Architects Department, 1959-1963); category A listed
- Dam Park Stadium stand, Ayr (Maurice Hickey, 1961-1963); category B listed
- Netherdale football stadium, Galashiels, Scottish Borders (Peter Womersley, 1963); category A listed
- Nuffield Transplantation Surgery Unit, Western General Hospital, Edinburgh (Peter Womersley, 1963)
- St Bride's Church, East Kilbride, Glasgow (Gillespie, Kidd and Coia, 1964); category C listed
- Administration block, Lynebank Hospital, Dunfermline (Alison and Hutchison and Partners (Harry Horace Macdonald - partner in charge), 1965); category B listed
- Porthill Court and Seamount Court, Aberdeen (Aberdeen City Architects Department, 1959-1966); category A listed
- Virginia Court and Marischal Court, Aberdeen (Aberdeen City Architects Department, 1959-1966); category A listed
- St Peter's Seminary, Cardross, Dumbarton (Gillespie, Kidd & Coia 1966); category A listed
- Glasgow Airport, Paisley (Basil Spence, 1966)
- Cumbernauld town centre, Cumbernauld (1963–1967); Demolition begun 2024

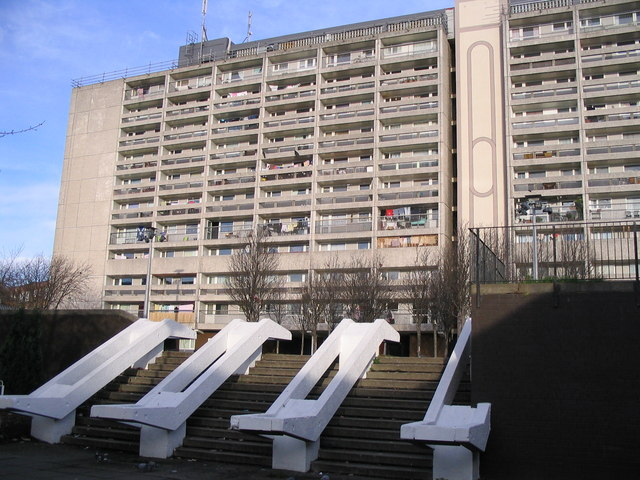
Linksview House (1964–1967)

- Linksview House, Leith (Alison & Hutchison & Partners (Robert Forbes Hutchison – senior partner; Walter Scott – partner in charge), 1964–1967); category A listed
- The Pyramid at Anderston (former Anderston Kelvingrove Parish Church), Glasgow (Honeyman, Jack and Robertson, 1965-1968); category B listed
- Anniesland Court, Anniesland, Glasgow (J. Holmes and Partners 1966-1968); Category A listed
- Dollan Aqua Centre, previously known as Dollan Baths, East Kilbride, Glasgow (Alexander Buchanan Campbell, 1968); category A listed
- Andrew Melville Hall, St Andrews (James Stirling, 1968); category A listed
- Canongate Flats, Edinburgh (Basil Spence, 1969); category B listed
- Norco House, Aberdeen (Covell, Matthews and Partners, 1966–1970)
- St Andrew's Roman Catholic Church, Livingston (George R M Kennedy for Alison and Hutchison and Partners, 1970); category B listed
- Blocks B and D, Summerhall, former Royal (Dick) School of Veterinary Studies (Alan Reiach, Eric Hall and Partners, 1969-1971); category B listed (listing includes main college building; 1909–1916)
- Bernat Klein Studio, Selkirk (Peter Womersley, 1972); category A listed
- Matthew Building, University of Dundee, Dundee (James Paul of Baxter, Clark and Paul, 1969-74); category B listed
- Thistle Court, Aberdeen (Aberdeen City Architects Department, 1959-1966); Category A listed 2021, removed 2022
- The Mackintosh House, Hunterian Museum and Art Gallery, Glasgow (1970s, "one of the only buildings in the world mixing brutalism and art nouveau")
- The Met Tower, Glasgow (Peter Williams, 1961-1964) Category B listed
- The Savoy Center, Glasgow (Gavin Paterson and Sons, 1971-1979) Category B listed
- Former Clydesdale Bank, Kilmarnock (Hay, Steel and Partners, 1975–1976); category C listed
- Hutcheon Court and Greig Court, Aberdeen (Aberdeen City Architects Department, 1973-1978); Category A listed 2021, removed 2022
- Air Traffic Control Tower, Aberdeen International Airport, Aberdeen (McAlister Armstrong and Partners, 1978); category B listed
- Bourdon Building, Glasgow School of Art, Glasgow (Keppie, Henderson and Partners, 1979)
- Glasgow Sheriff Court, Glasgow (Richard De'Ath for Keppie Henderson and Partners, 1972-1986); category B listed
- The Pontecorvo, Kelvingrove, Glasgow (Basil Spence 1962-67) Demolished in 2022

==== Wales ====
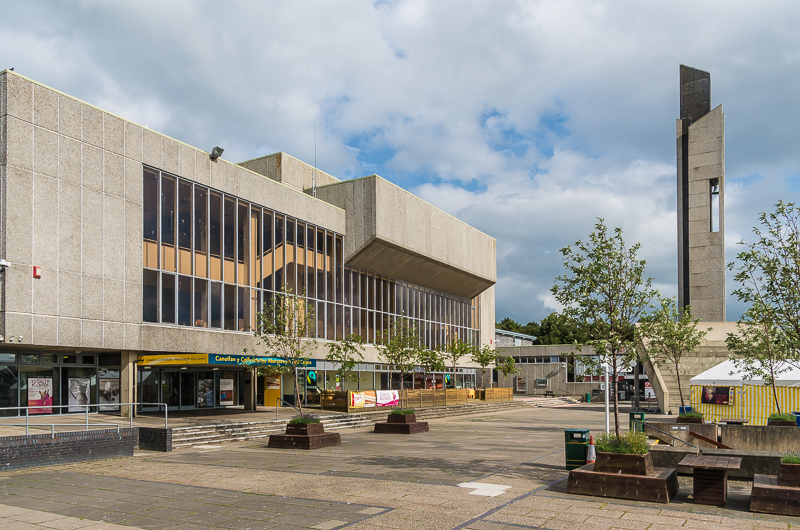
The Great Hall (left) and Bell Tower (right), Aberystwyth Arts Centre

- Margam Steel Works, Port Talbot (Percy Thomas, 1951)
- Trawsfynydd nuclear power station, Eryri (Basil Spence, 1963)
- George Street Bridge, Newport (Mott, Hay and Anderson, 1964); grade II* listed
- Port Talbot Bypass (1966)
- Flintshire County Hall, Mold (Robert Harvey, 1968)
- Margam Crematorium, Port Talbot, (FD Williamson & Associates, 1969); grade II* listed
- Brambell Building, Bangor University, Bangor (Percy Thomas, 1969); grade II listed
- The Great Hall, Aberystwyth Arts Centre (Percy Thomas Partnership (Ivan Dale Owen with I. L. Stephen James and John Vergette), 1967-70); grade II* listed
- Bell Tower, Aberystwyth Arts Centre (Percy Thomas Partnership (Ivan Dale Owen), 1970); grade II listed
- Arts and Social Sciences Library, Cardiff University (Harry Faulkner-Brown 1973–1975); grade II listed
- Hugh Owen Building, Aberystywth University (Percy Thomas Partnership (John Vergette), 1973–1979); grade II listed
- Cathays Park 2, Crown Buildings, Cardiff (Alex Gordon and Partners, 1979); grade II listed
- St David's Hall, Cardiff (1978–82): grade II listed
- West Glamorgan County Hall, Swansea (C. W. Quick, 1982)

== North America ==
=== Canada ===
==== Alberta ====
- University of Lethbridge, Lethbridge, Alberta, Arthur Erickson (1971)
- Centennial Planetarium, Calgary, McMillan Long & Associates, (1967, now Contemporary Calgary)
- Education Centre Building, Calgary, Alberta, (1969)
- 404 Sixth Avenue SW, Calgary, (1970)

==== British Columbia ====
- MacMillan Bloedel Building, Vancouver, British Columbia, (Erickson/Massey Architects with Francis Donaldson, 1968)
- Simon Fraser University – Burnaby Campus, Burnaby, British Columbia, Arthur Erickson, (1965)
- University of Victoria - Craigdarroch Residences, Victoria, British Columbia, (1964–67)
- University of Victoria - Lansdowne Residences, Victoria, (1969)

==== Manitoba ====
- Centennial Concert Hall, Winnipeg, Manitoba (1968)
- Manitoba Theatre Centre, Winnipeg, Manitoba (Number Ten Architectural Group, 1972)
- Public Safety Building, Winnipeg, Manitoba (Libling Michener & Associates, 1965)

==== Nova Scotia ====
- Fenwick Tower, Halifax, Nova Scotia, Sydney P. Dumaresq, (1971)
- Killam Memorial Library, Dalhousie University, Halifax, Nova Scotia, Leslie R. Fairn, (1966–71)

==== Ontario ====
- Allen Square building, 180 King St. S Waterloo (1980) Currently being converted into condos as of 2026.
- Environment Canada, MSC Headquarters, Toronto, (1971)
- Lester B. Pearson Building, Ottawa, (1973)
- National Arts Centre, Ottawa, (1969)
- Oakville Centre for the Performing Arts, Oakville, Ontario (1977)

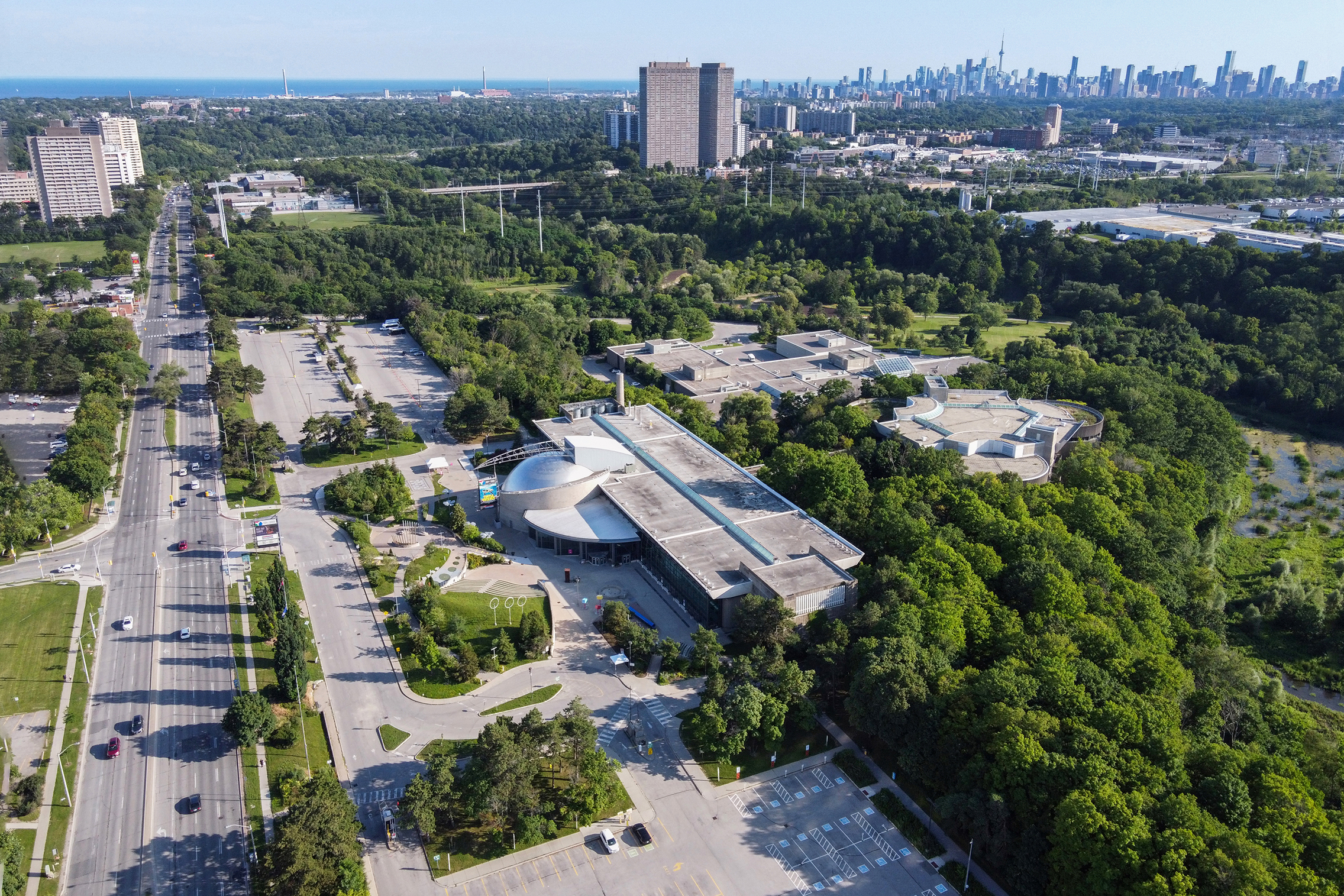
Ontario Science Centre

- Ontario Science Centre, Toronto, Ontario, (1969)
- Rochdale College, Toronto, Elmar Tampõld & John Wells, (1968)
- Toronto Metropolitan University - Toronto Metropolitan University Library, (1974)
- University of Guelph – Center, Main Library and South Residence/Maritime/Prairie Hall, Guelph, Ontario (John Andrews, 1965)
- University of Toronto Mississauga - William G. Davis Building, Mississauga, Raymond Moriyama, (1973)
- University of Toronto Scarborough - Humanities Wing, Science Wing, Toronto, both John Andrews, (1964)
- University of Toronto St. George - John P. Robarts Research Library, Toronto, A.S. Mathers & E.J. Haldenby, (1973)
- University of Waterloo - Mathematics and Computer Building, Waterloo, (1968)
- University of Western Ontario - D. B. Weldon Library, London, Ontario, (1972)
- Waterloo Public Library - Main Branch, Albert St, Waterloo (1966)
- Walter Carsen Centre, Toronto, Arthur Erickson, (1984)

==== Québec ====
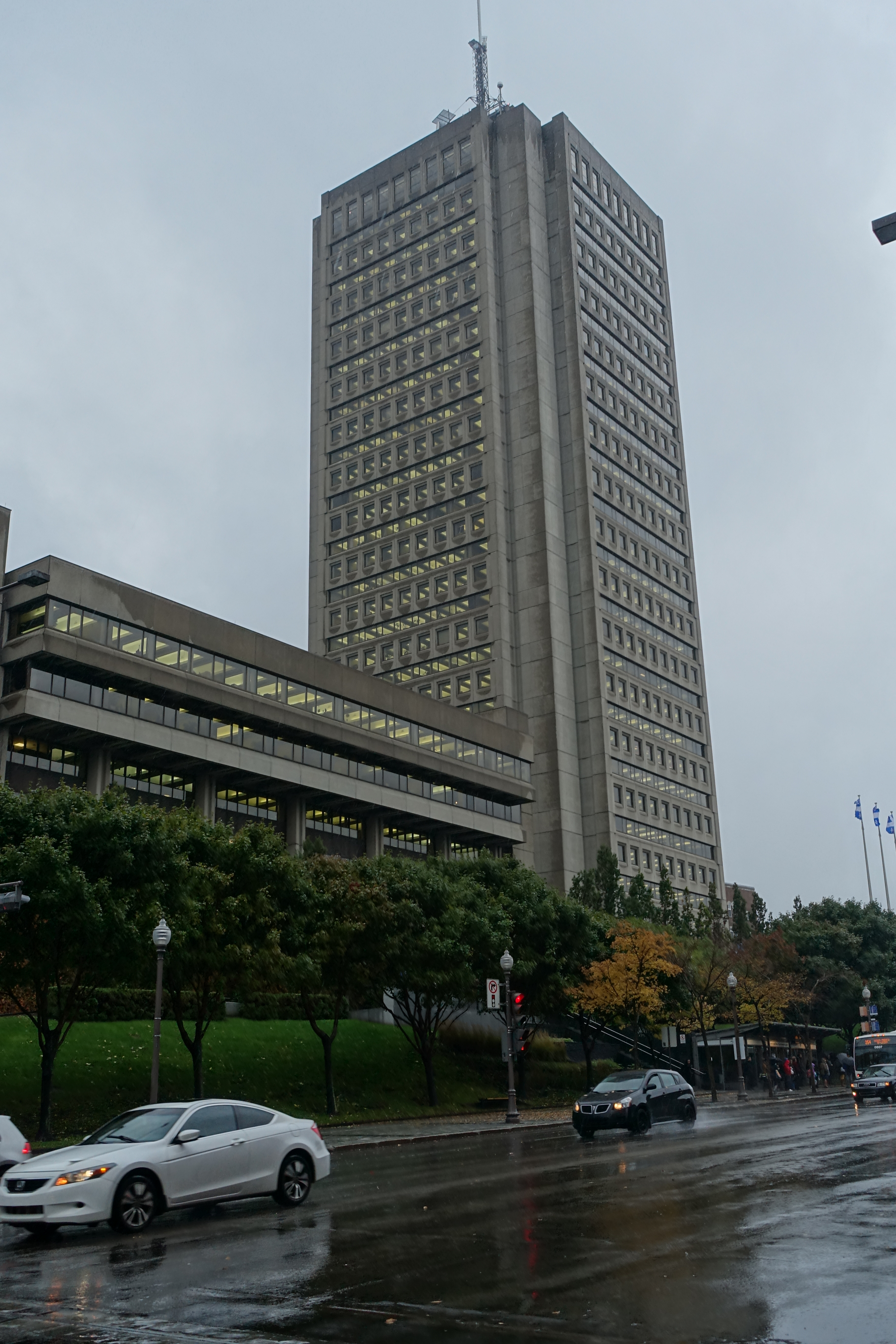
Édifice Marie-Guyart, Québec

- Édifice Marie-Guyart, Québec City, (1972)
- Habitat 67, 1967 World's Fair, Montreal, Quebec, Moshe Safdie, (1967)
- Place Bonaventure, Montreal, Quebec, Ray Affleck, (1967)
- Burnside Hall, Montreal, Quebec, (1970)
- Stephen Leacock Building, Montreal, Quebec, (1965)

==== Saskatchewan ====
- University of Saskatchewan - Main Library, Education Building, Health Sciences Building, Saskatoon, (1970)

=== Cuba ===
- Embassy of the United States, Havana, (1953)

=== Mexico ===
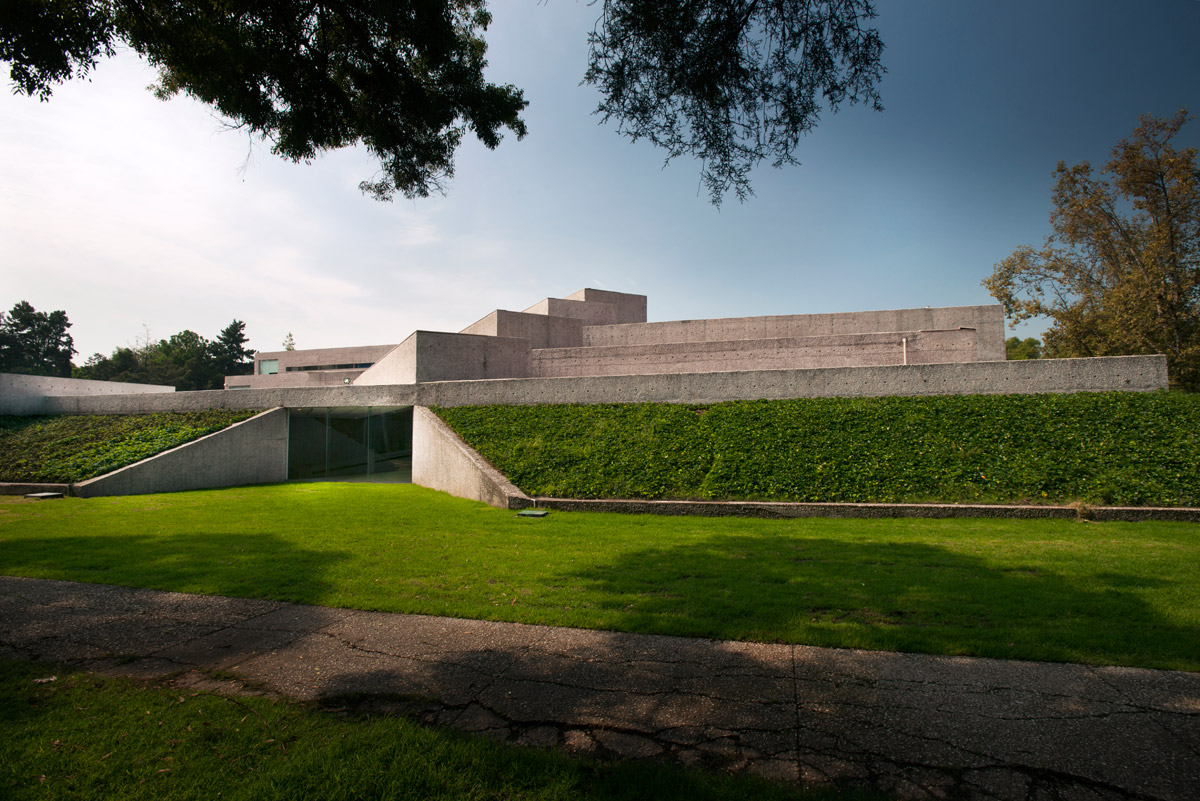
Museo Tamayo Arte Contemporáneo

- Museo Tamayo Arte Contemporáneo, Mexico City, Abraham Zabludovsky and Teodoro González de León, (1981)

== Oceania ==
=== Australia ===
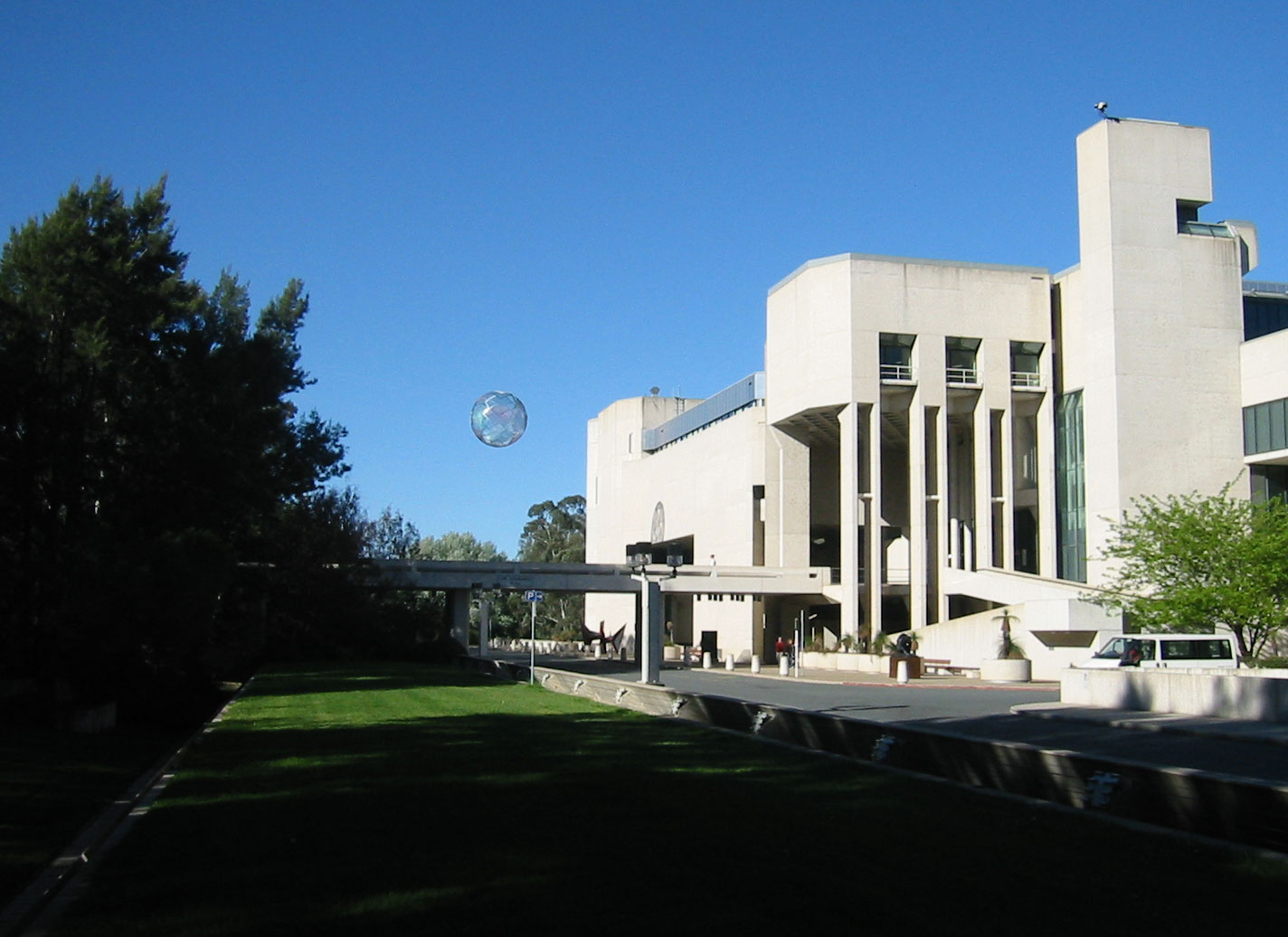
National Gallery of Australia, Canberra, prior to renovations

- Council House, Perth (Howlett & Bailey, 1962)
- Macquarie University, Sydney, (1964)
- Macquarie University Library, Sydney, (1967–1978)
- Harold Holt Memorial Swimming Centre, Melbourne (Kevin Borland and Daryl Jackson, 1969)
- Llewellyn Hall, Canberra, (Daryl Jackson and Evan Walker, 1970)
- National Carillon, Canberra, (Cameron, Chisholm & Nicol, 1970)
- Cameron Offices, Canberra, (John Andrews, 1972)
- Perth Concert Hall, Perth (Howlett & Bailey, 1973)
- Biochemistry Building G08, University of Sydney (1973)
- Concrete bus shelters in Canberra (Clem Cummings, 1975 to early 1990s)
- Curtin Business School, Curtin University of Technology, Perth
- Sirius Building, Sydney (1978–79)
- High Court of Australia Building, Canberra (Edwards Madigan Torzillo and Briggs, 1980)
- UTS Tower, University of Technology, Sydney, (1979)
- National Gallery of Australia, Canberra, (James Johnson Sweeney and James Mollison (1982)
- Performing Arts Centre, Geelong, (1983)
- Queensland Cultural Centre, Brisbane, (1985)

=== New Zealand ===
- Moana Pool, Dunedin (1964)
- Christchurch College, Christchurch (Sir Miles Warren, 1964)
- Alexandra District Court, Alexandra (1972)
- Hannah Playhouse, Wellington (James Beard, 1973)
- Puaka–James Hight Building, University of Canterbury, Christchurch (1974)
- Richardson Building, University of Otago, Dunedin (Ted McCoy, 1979)
- Dunedin Public Hospital, Dunedin (1980)
- Te Puna Mātauranga o Aotearoa National Library of New Zealand (1987)

== South America ==
=== Argentina ===
==== Buenos Aires ====
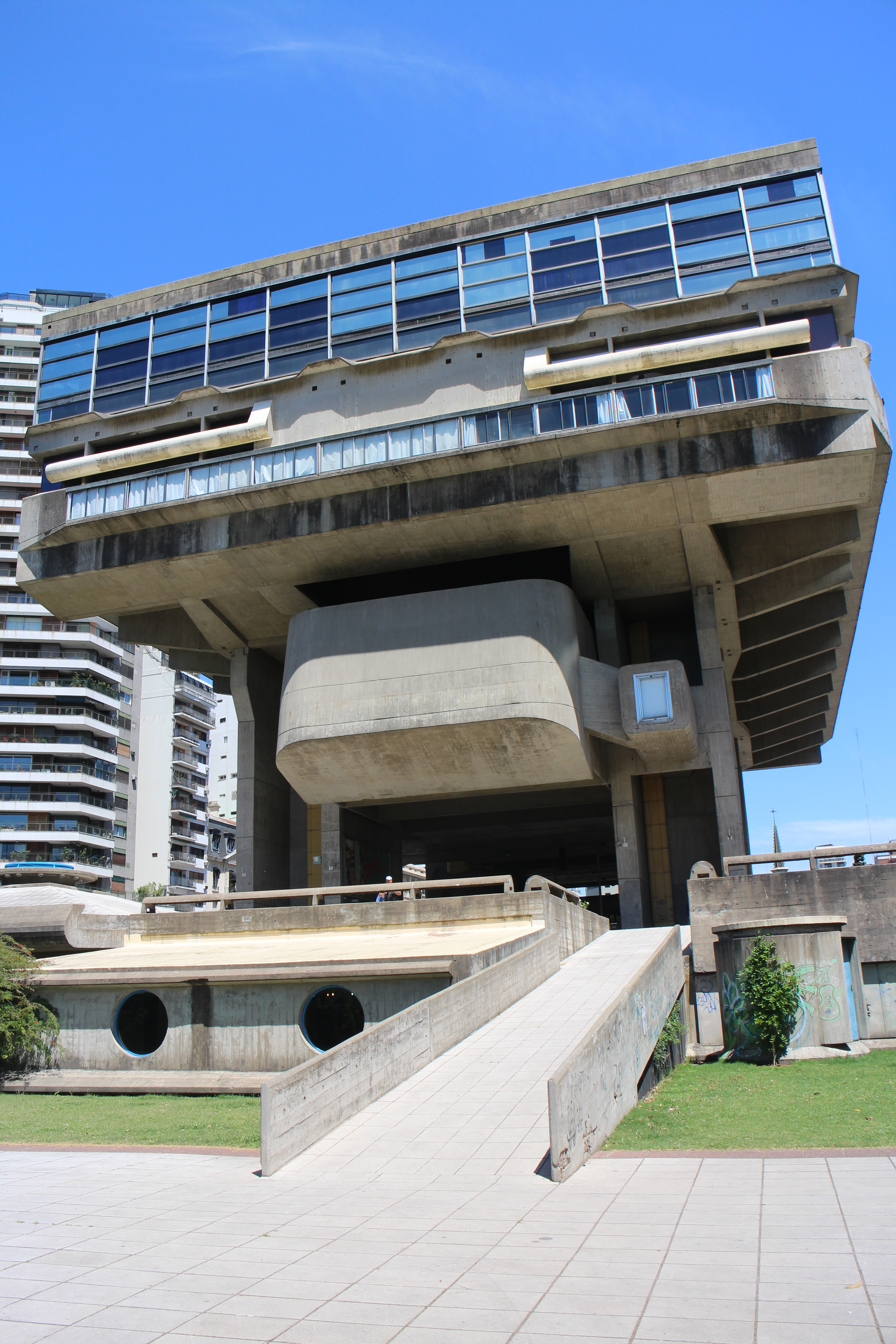
National Library of the Argentine Republic

- Chacarita Cemetery Subterranean / Sixth Pantheon, Buenos Aires, (1950–1958)
- Republica Building, Buenos Aires, (1951–1954)
- Santa Maria de Betania Parish, Buenos Aires, (1954)
- Santa Catalina de Alejandria Church, Buenos Aires, (1957–1968)

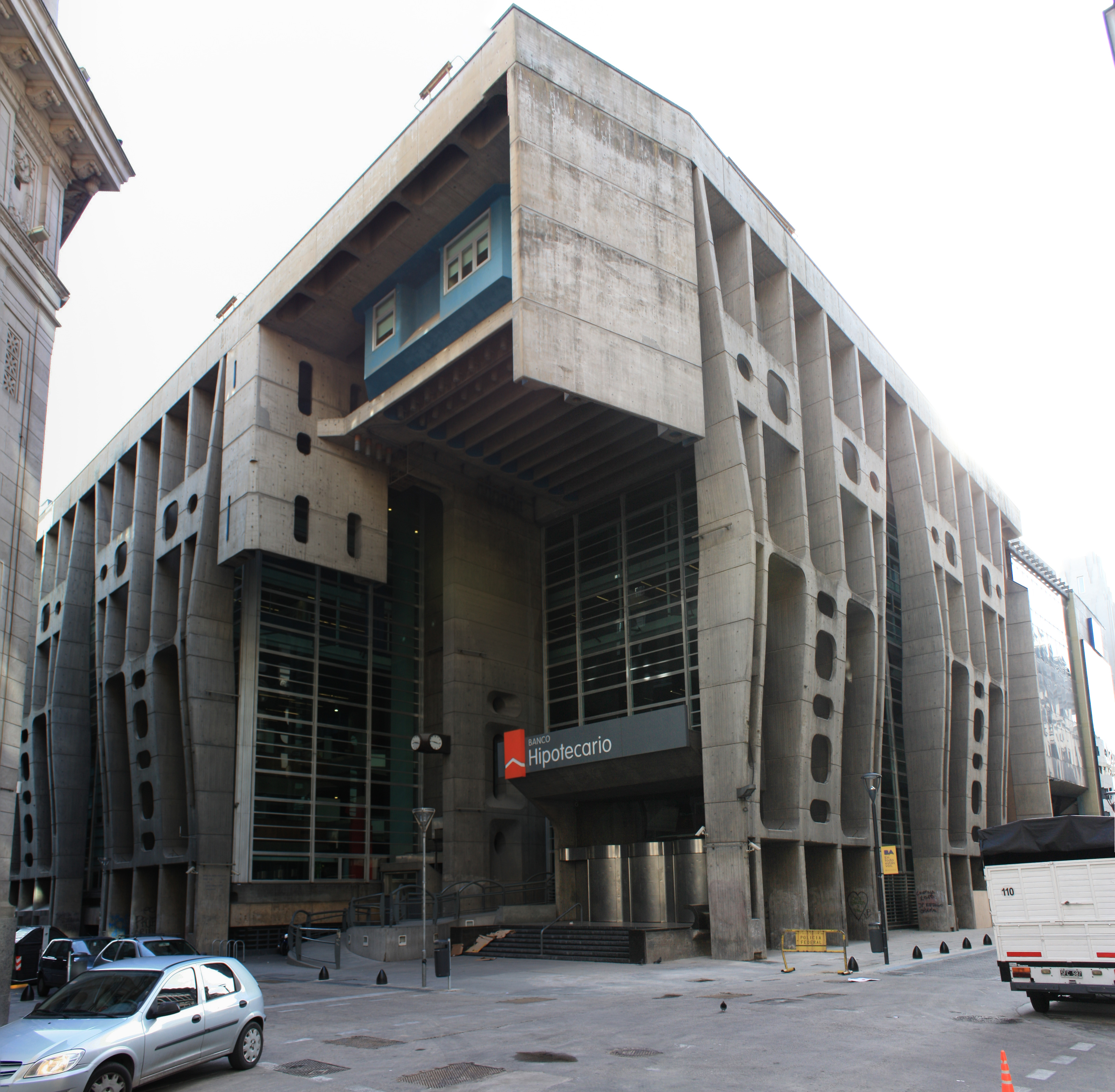
The Banco de Londres y América del Sur Headquarters

- Banco de Londres y América del Sur Headquarters, Buenos Aires, Clorindo Testa, (1959)
- University Campus / Pavilion II, Buenos Aires, (1961)
- Della Penna School, Buenos Aires, (1963–1969)
- Argentine Automobile Club - Once, Buenos Aires, (1968)
- Argentine Automobile Club - Palermo, Buenos Aires, (1968)
- Telefónica Inclán, Buenos Aires, (1968)
- Dorrego Tower, Buenos Aires, (1968–1971)
- Nuestra Señora del Valle Parish, Buenos Aires, (1969)
- Acoyte Complex, Buenos Aires, (1969)
- Rioja Complex, Buenos Aires, (1969–1973)
- Institute of the Argentine Federal Police, Buenos Aires, (1974)
- Castex Tower, Buenos Aires, (1975–1985)
- Parking Marcelo T. De Alvear 686, Buenos Aires, (1970s)
- Arribeños 1630, Buenos Aires, (1970s)
- Arribeños 1684, Buenos Aires, (1970s)
- San Pauls School, Buenos Aires, (1970s)
- Normal High School No.1, Buenos Aires, (1970s)
- Rodriguez Peña 2043 Building, Buenos Aires, (1975–1978)
- Colpayo 54/56, Buenos Aires, (1978)
- River Plate Monumental Stadium, Buenos Aires, (1978–1982)
- Brazilian Embassy, Buenos Aires, (1978–1989)
- National Library of the Argentine Republic, Buenos Aires, Clorindo Testa, (1992)

==== Córdoba ====
- Alas Complex, Córdoba, (1974)

==== La Plata ====
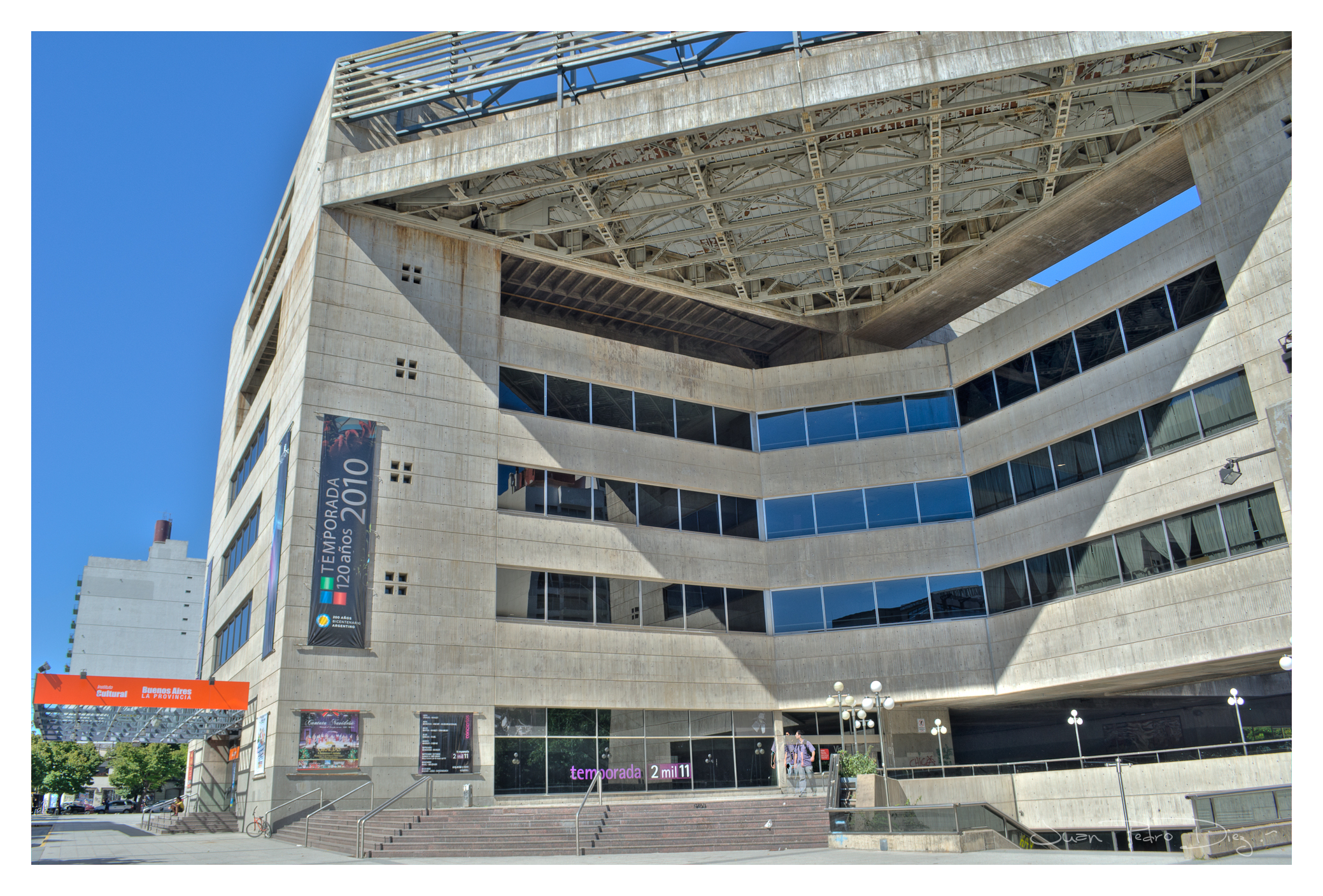
Teatro Argentino de La Plata

- Teatro Argentino de La Plata, La Plata, (1999)

=== Barbados ===
- The General Post Office (GPO), Bridgetown, Barbados. (1984)

=== Brazil ===
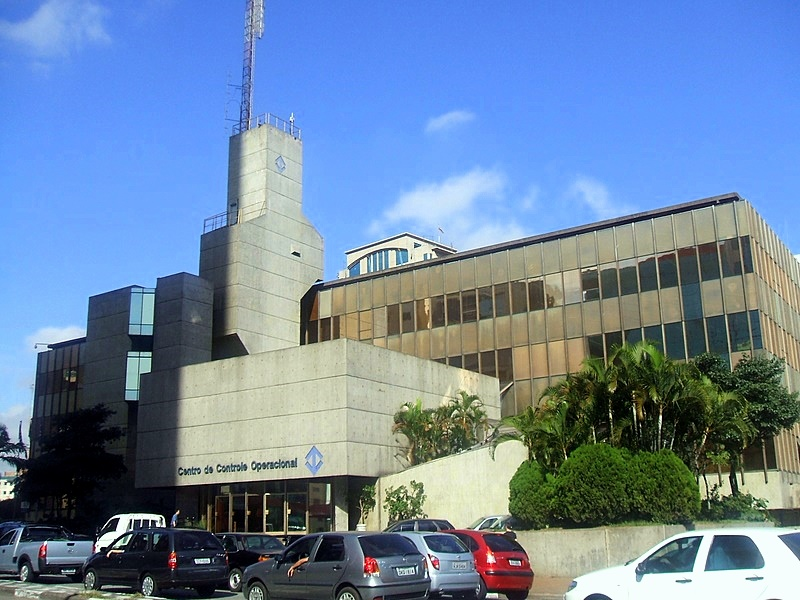
Operational control center of the São Paulo metro

- São Paulo Metro, São Paulo, (1974–1980)
- Catedral Metropolitana de Maringá, Maringá, Paraná, (1958–1972)
- Centro de Exposições do Centro Administrativo da Bahia (1974)

=== Chile ===
- National Congress of Chile, Valparaíso, (1990)

=== Guyana ===
- Bank of Guyana (1965)

=== Peru ===
- The Petroperú Building, Lima
- Museo de la Nación, Lima
- University of Engineering and Technology, Lima
- Lima Civic Center, Lima

=== Venezuela ===
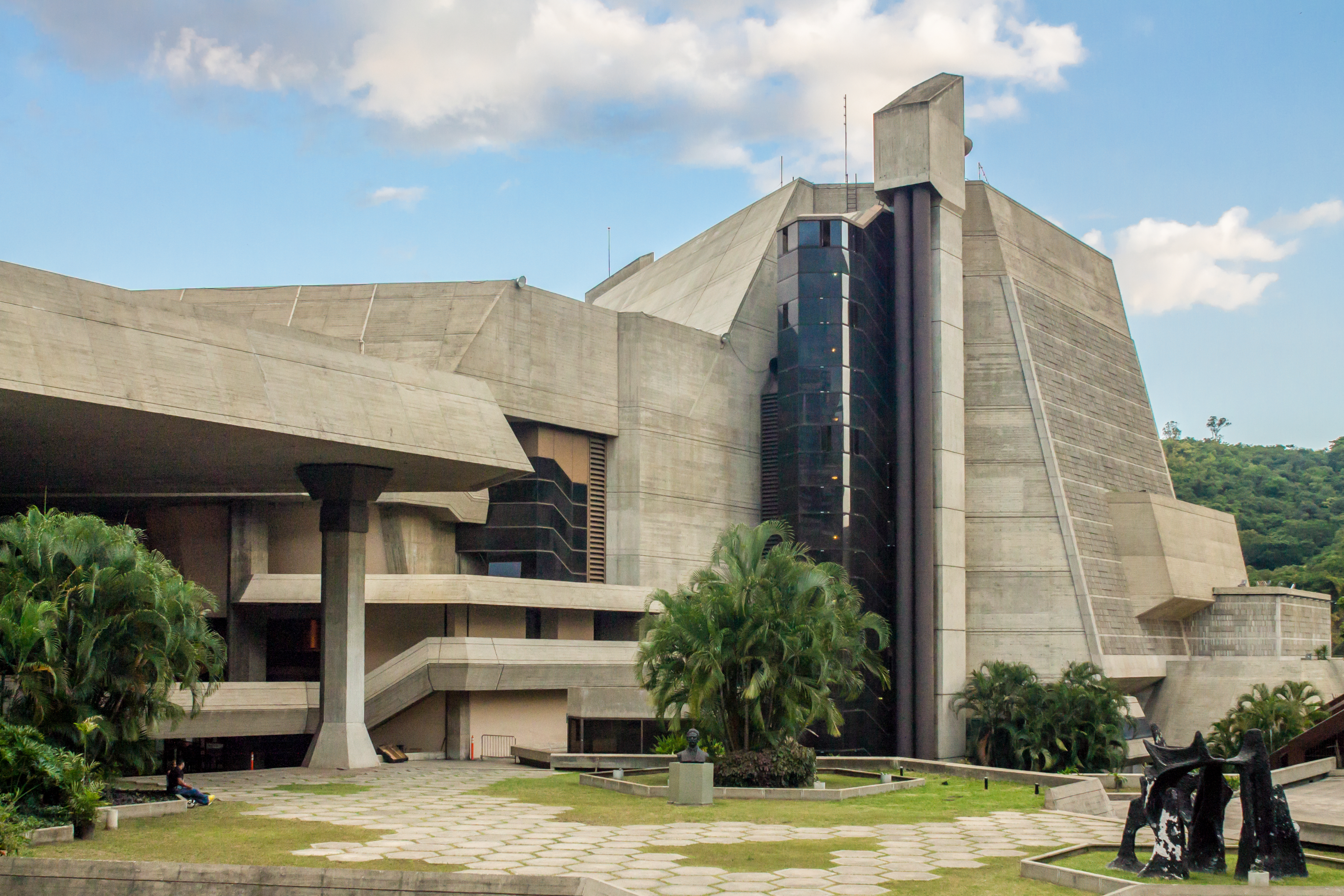
Teresa Carreño Cultural Complex

- El Helicoide, Caracas, (1955)
- Torre Phelps, Caracas, (1968)
- Edificio Altolar, Caracas, (1966)
- Iglesia San Juan Bosco, Caracas, (1967)
- Cuerpo de Bomberos del D.C, Caracas, (1967)
- Torre El Universal, Caracas, (1969)
- Centro Comercial Los Cedros, Caracas, (1970)
- Residencias Alpha, Caracas, (1970s)
- Torre CTV, Caracas, (1970s)
- Centro Bello Monte, Caracas, (1971)
- Centro Plaza, Caracas, (1972)
- Edificio CANTV, Caracas, (1973)
- Centro Comercial Libertador, Caracas, (1973)
- Torre La Primera, Caracas, (1973)
- Torre La Previsora, Caracas, (1973)
- Torre Diamen, Caracas, (1973)
- Banco Central de Venezuela, Caracas, (1973)
- Torre IBM, Caracas, (1974)
- Edificio CADAFE, Caracas, (1974)
- Torre Adriática, Caracas, (1974)
- Centro Altamira, Caracas, (1974)
- Museo de Arte Contemporáneo, Caracas, (1974)
- Torre El Chorro, Caracas, (1975)
- Torre Las Mercedes, Caracas, (1975)
- Torre Delta, Caracas, (1975)
- Edificio PANAVEN, Caracas, (1975)
- Edificio Banco Metropolitano, Caracas, (1976)
- Museo de Bellas Artes, Caracas, (1976)
- Instituto Nacional de Canalizaciones, Caracas, (1977)
- Torre Asociación Bancaria de Venezuela, Caracas, (1978)
- Torre América, Caracas, (1978)
- Torre Británica, Caracas, (1979)
- Edificio Oxal, Caracas, (1980s)
- Edificio La Unión, Caracas, (1980s)
- Torre Banco Lara, Caracas, (1982)
- Centro Comercial Ciudad Tamanaco, Caracas, (1982)
- Centro Nacional de Ajedrez, Caracas, (1982)
- Torre Clement, Caracas, (1982)
- Complejo Urbanístico Parque Central, Caracas, (1983)
- Teresa Carreño Cultural Complex, Caracas, (1983)
- Sede del Ateneo, Caracas, (1983)
- Edificio IMPRES, Caracas, (1983)
- Edificio Hener, Caracas, (1985)

== Gallery ==
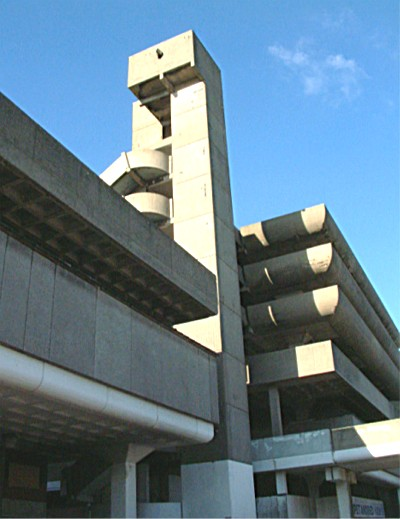
Tricorn Centre, United Kingdom

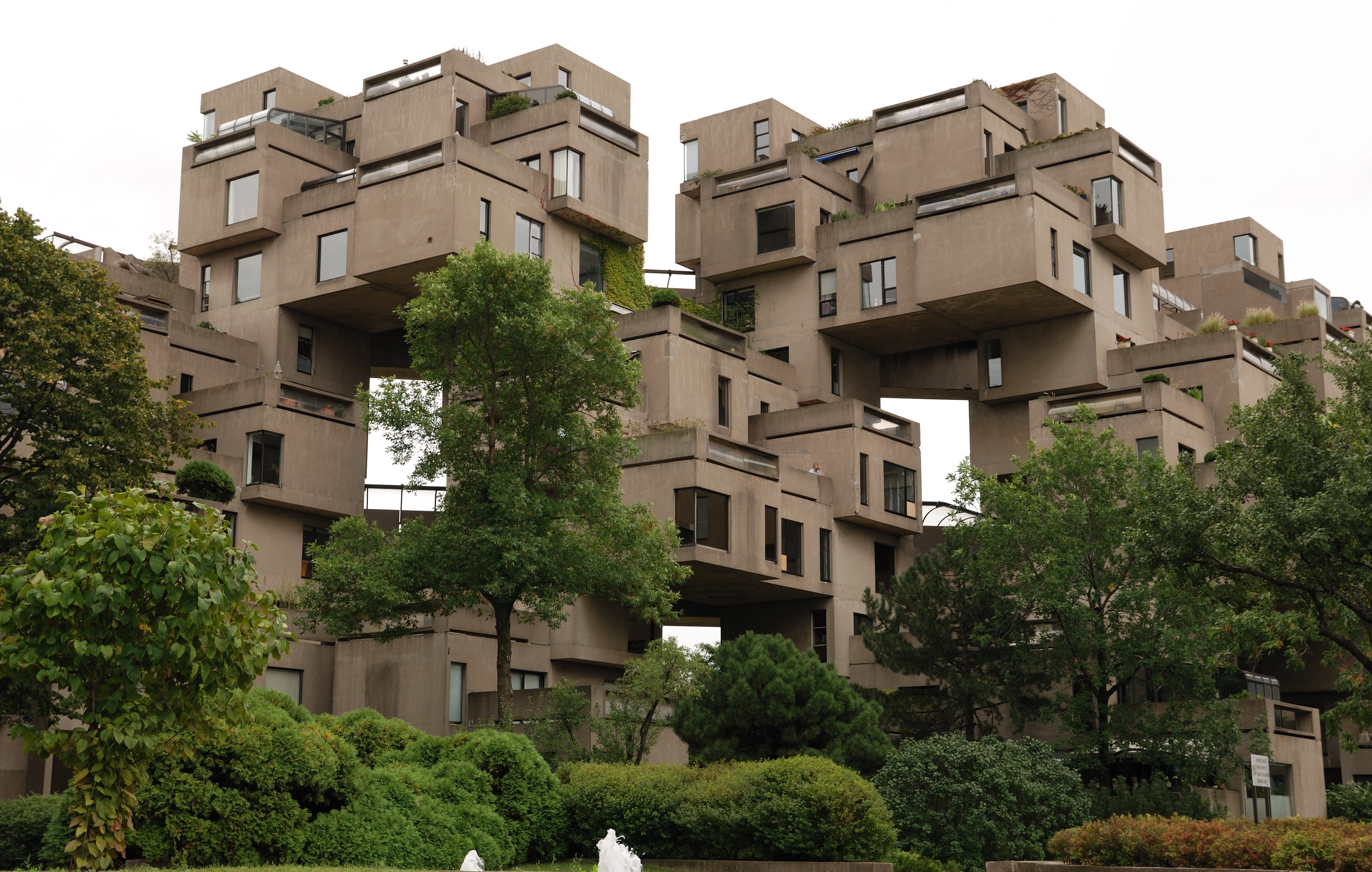
Habitat 67, Montreal, Canada

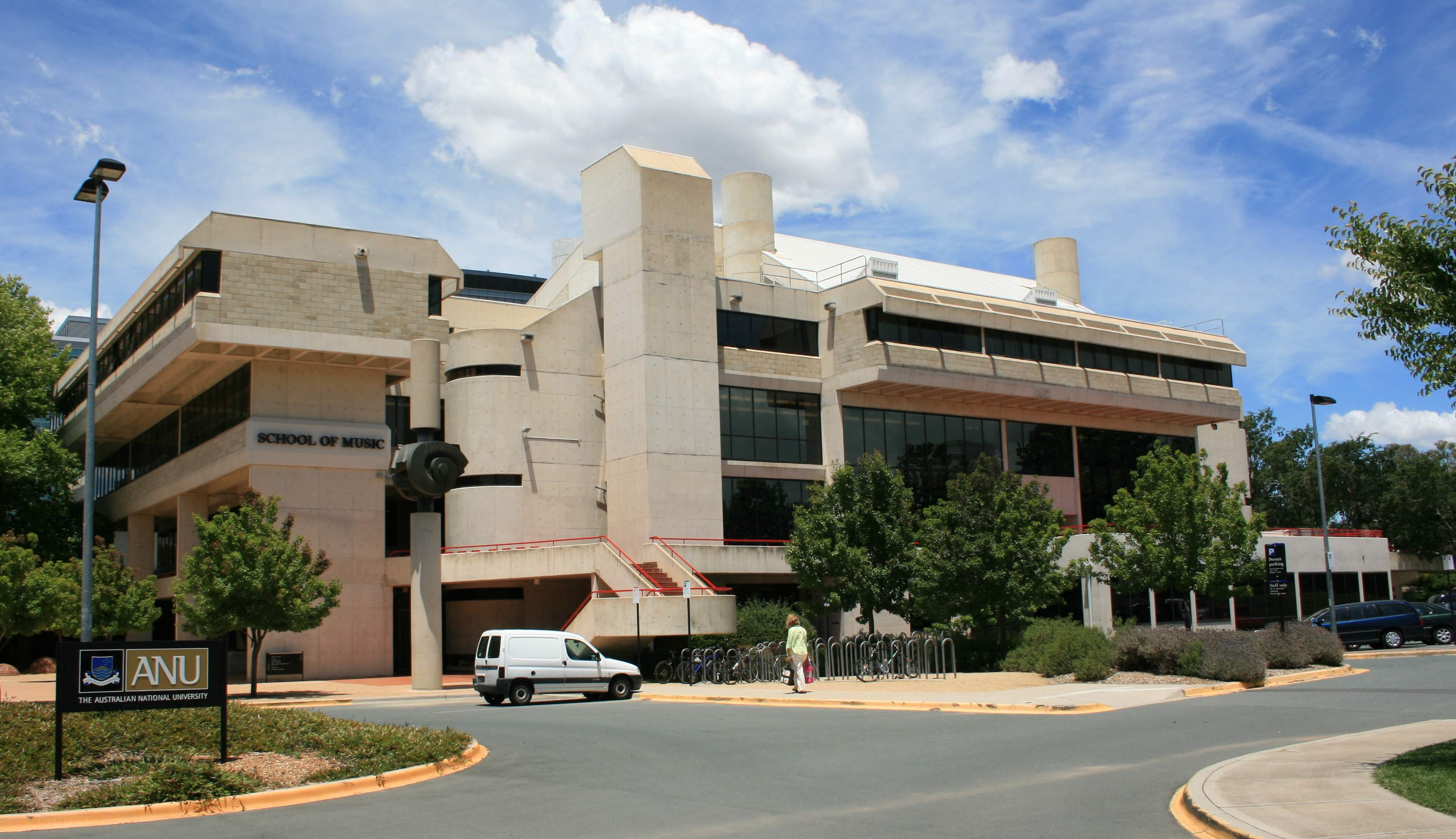
Llewellyn Hall, Canberra, Australia

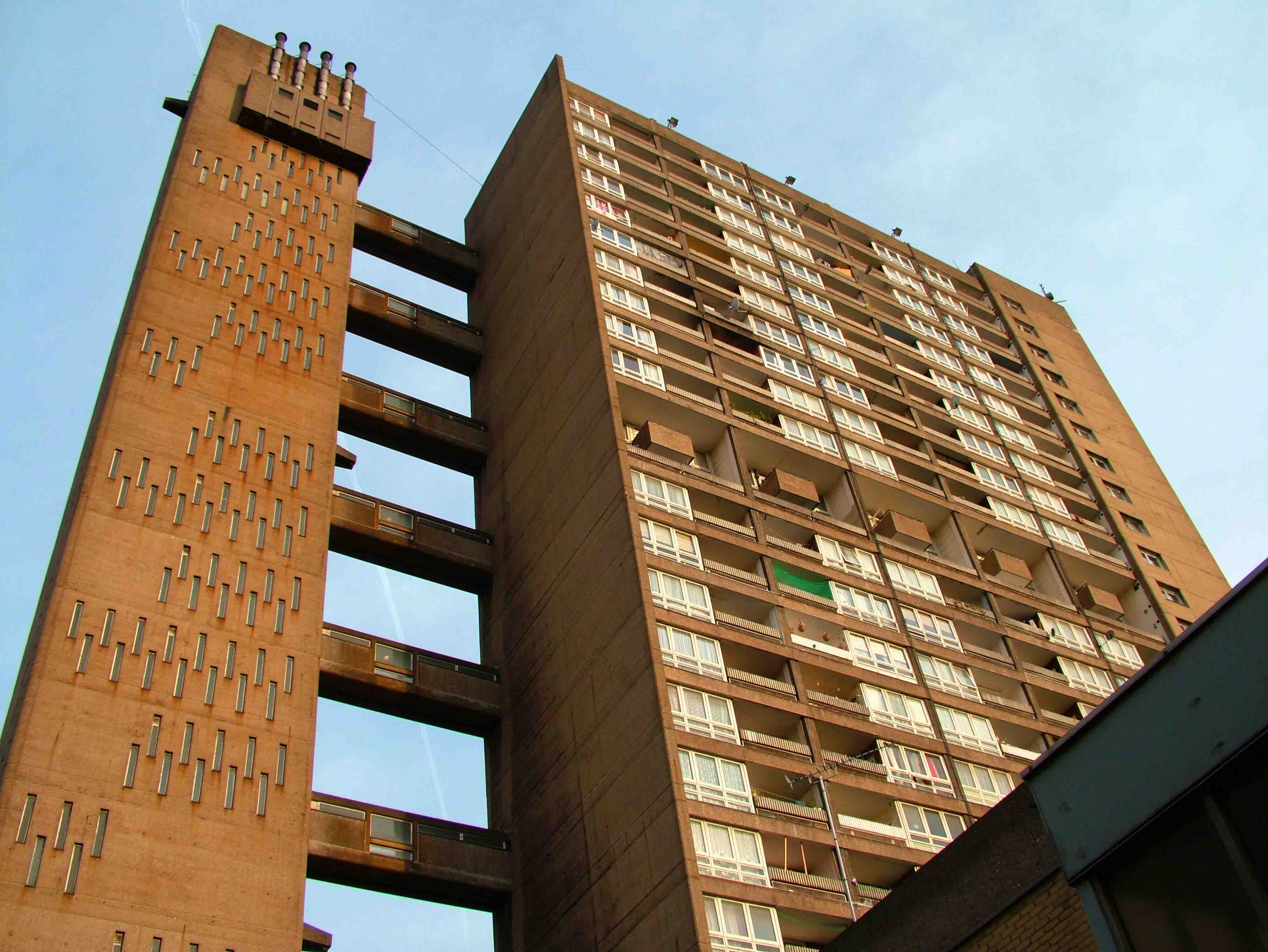
Balfron Tower, London

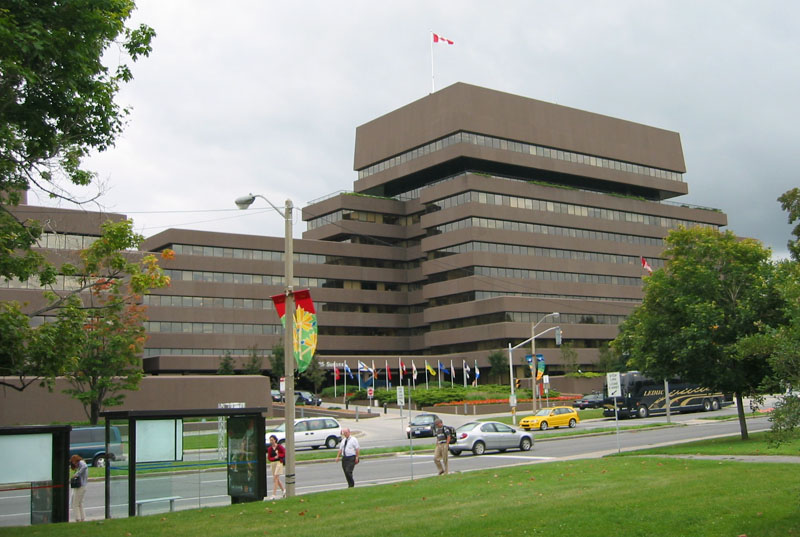
Lester B. Pearson Building, Ottawa, Canada

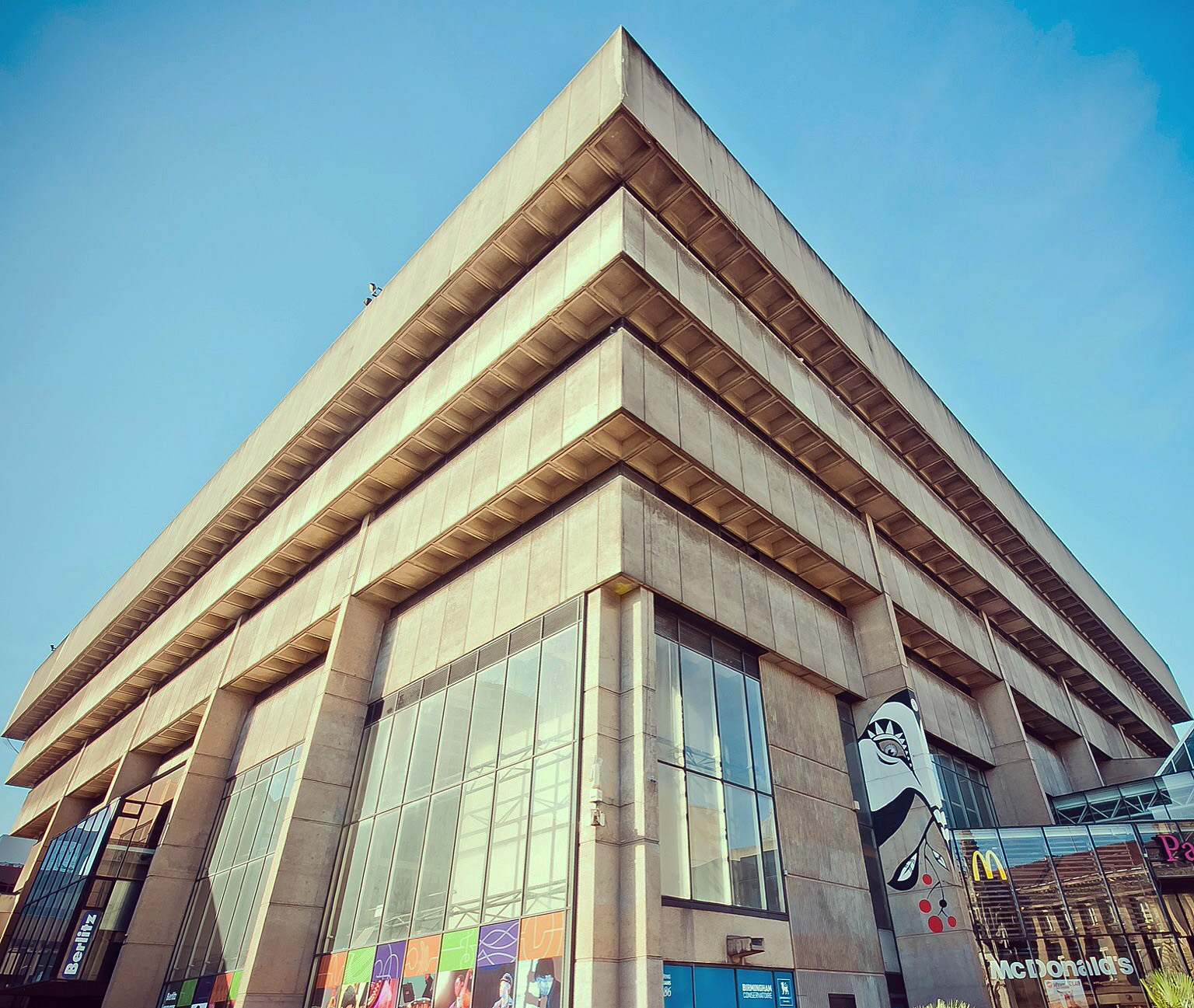
Birmingham Central Library, United Kingdom

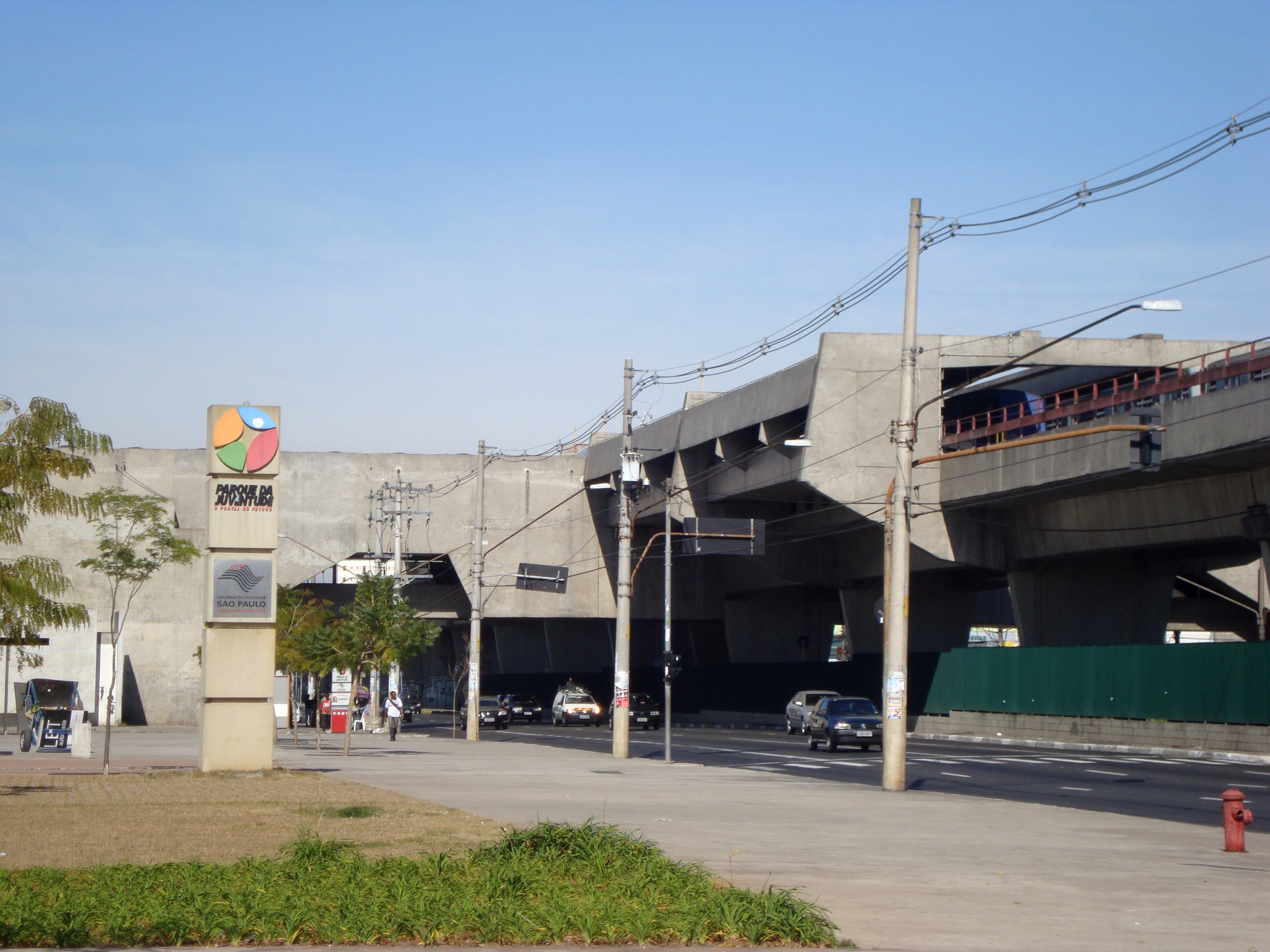
Carandiru (São Paulo Metro), Brazil

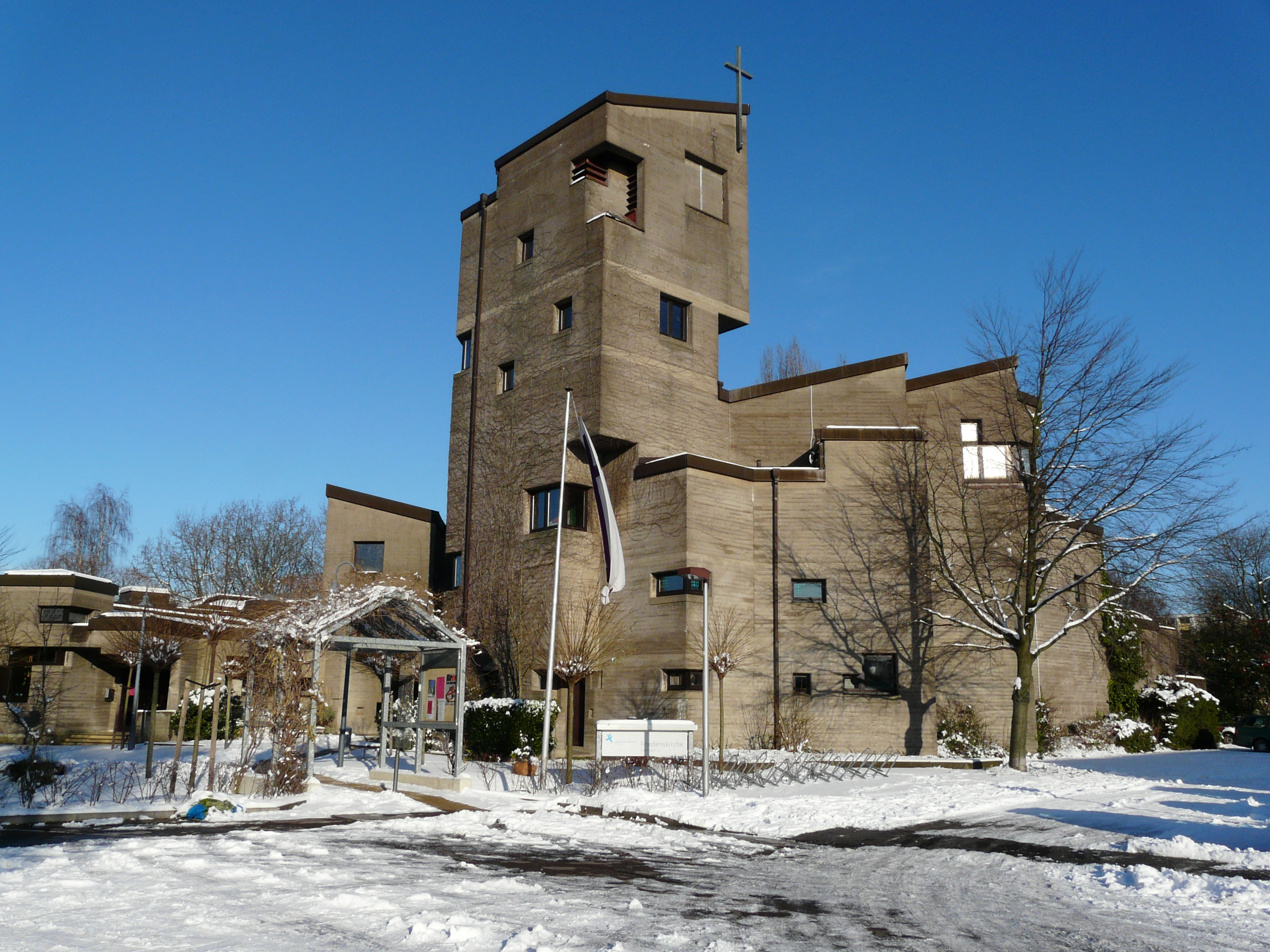
Friedenskirche, Monheim-Baumberg, Germany

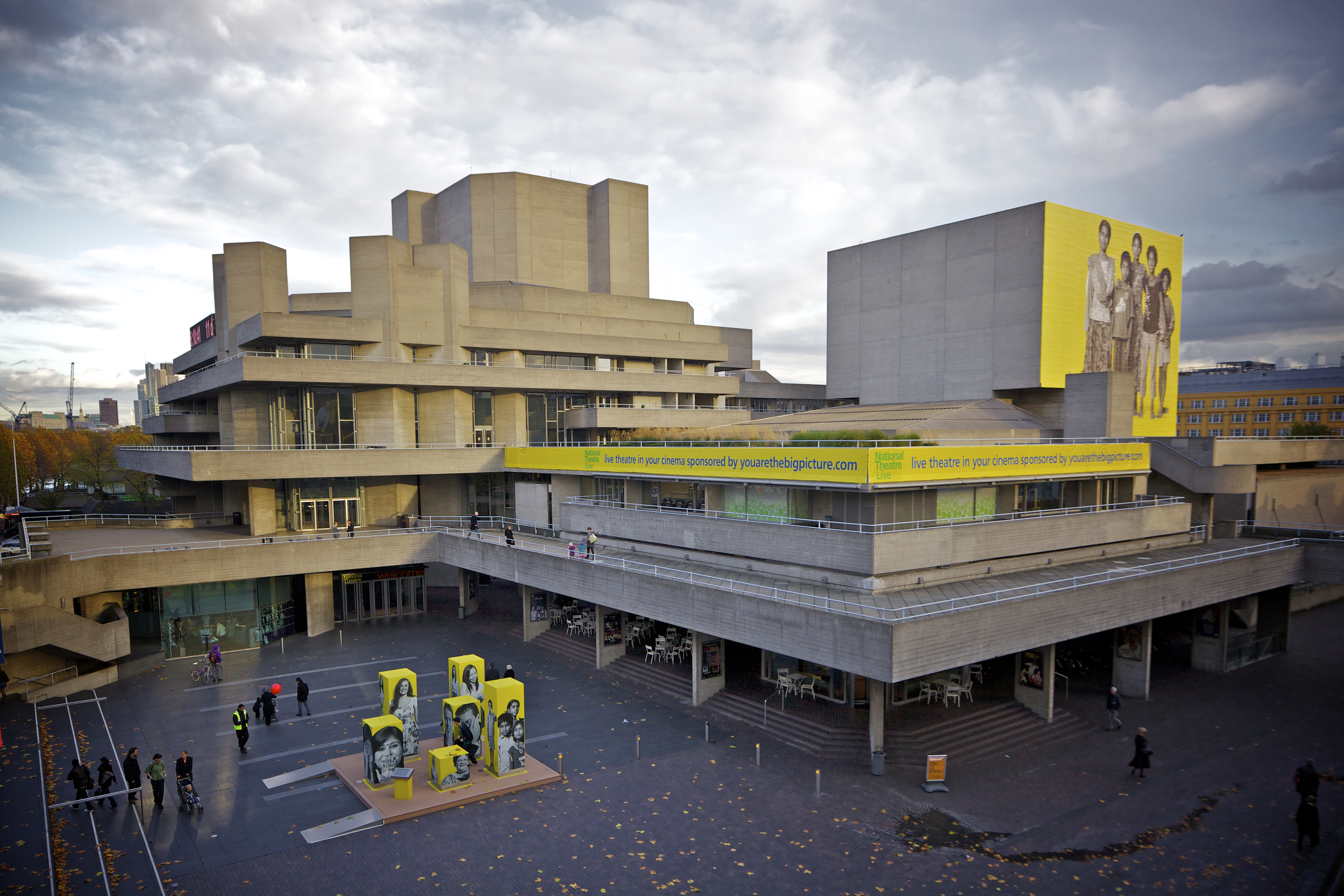
Royal National Theatre

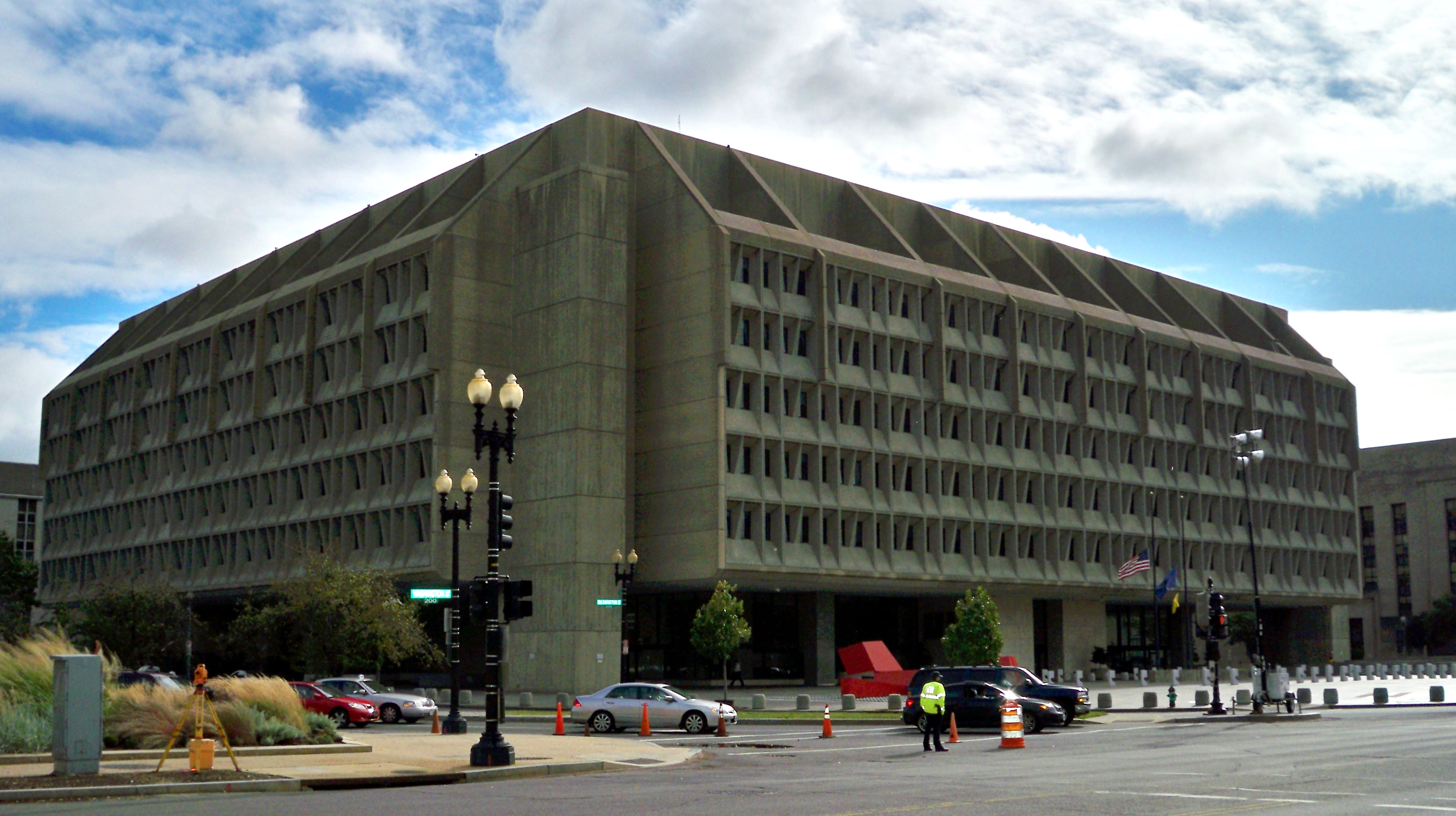
Hubert H. Humphrey Building

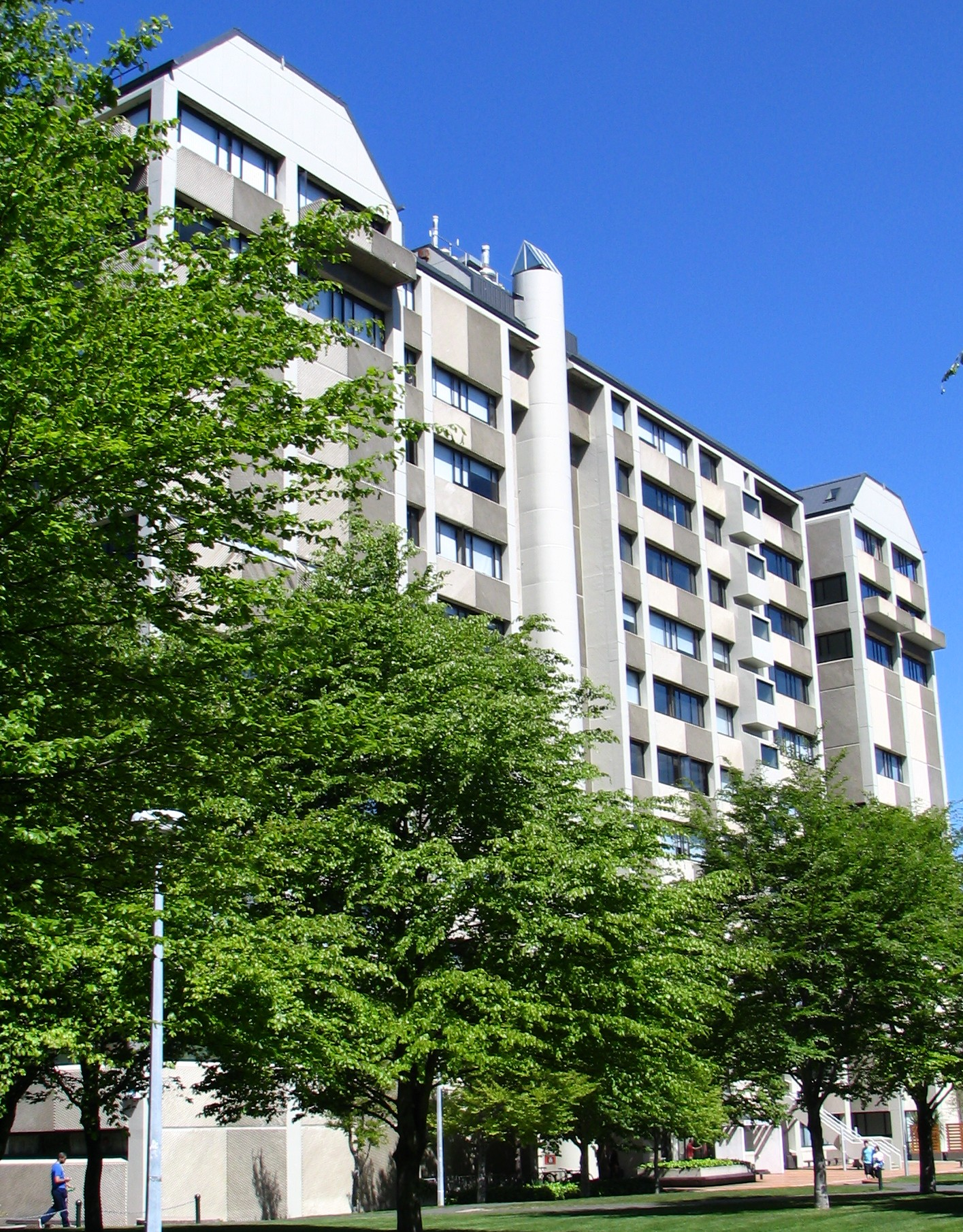
Richardson Building, University of Otago, New Zealand

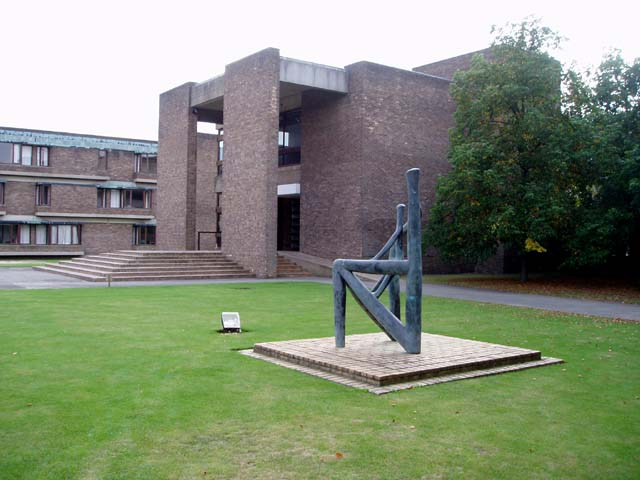
Churchill College, Cambridge, United Kingdom

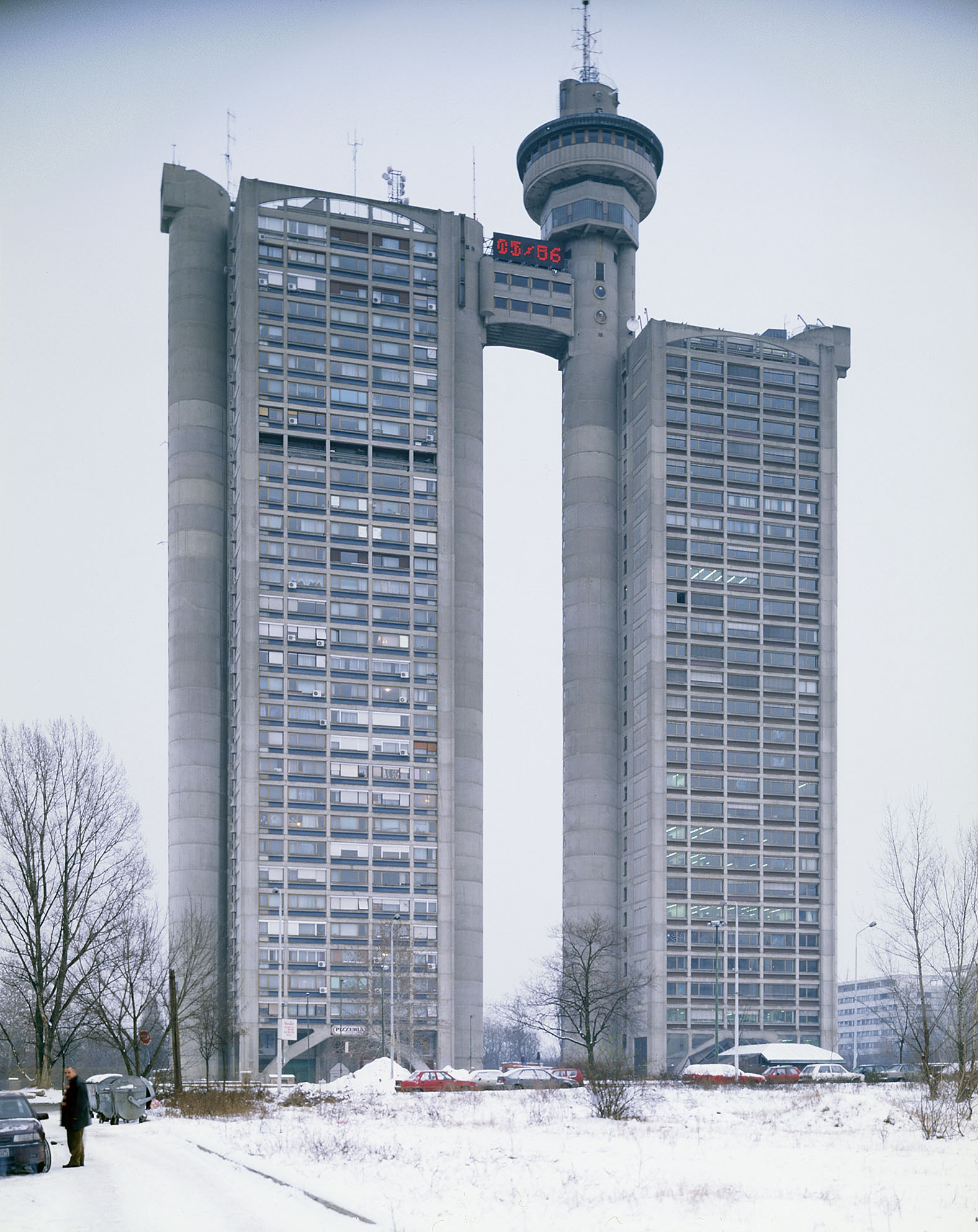
Western City Gate, Belgrade, Serbia

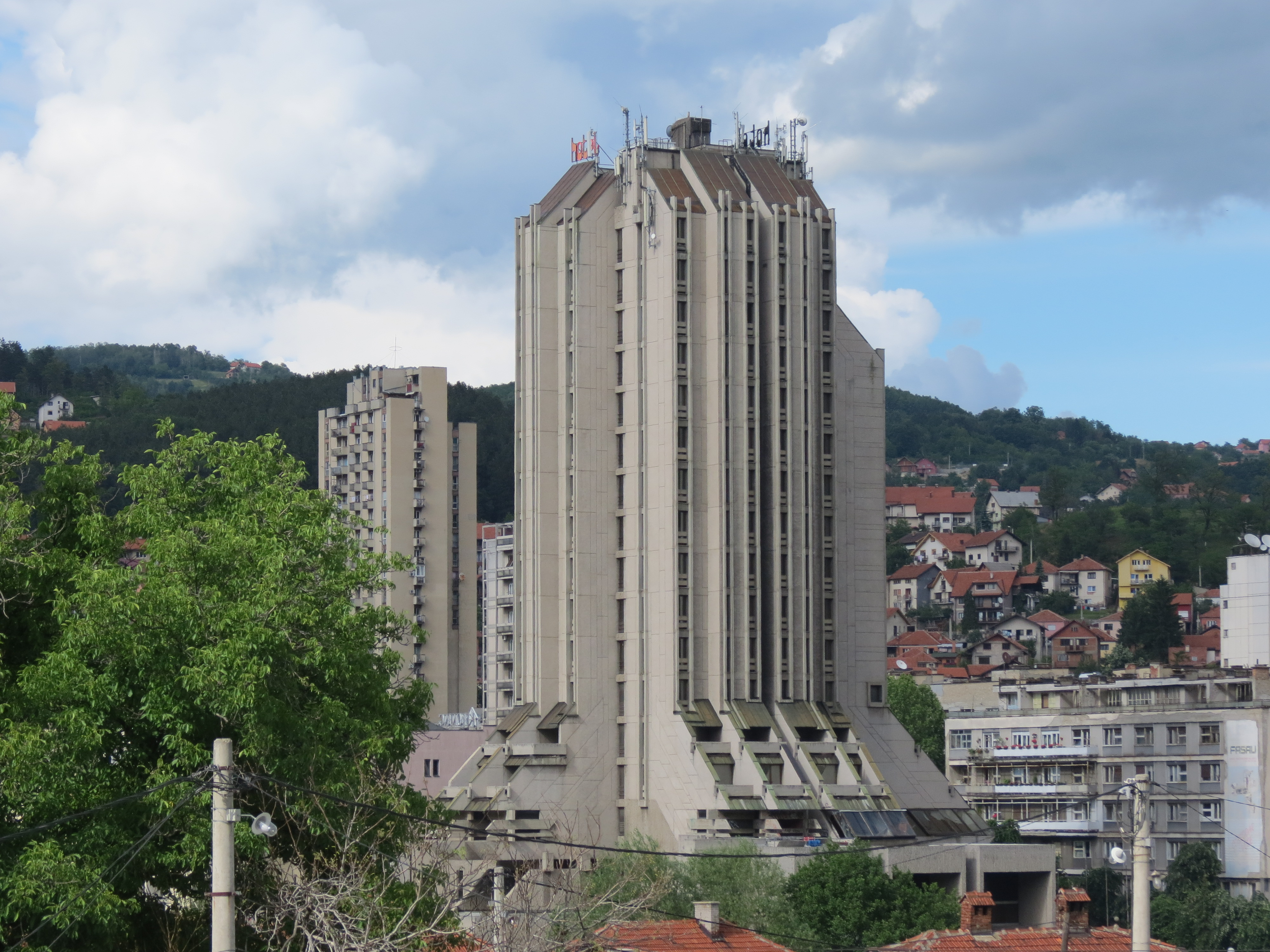
Zlatibor Hotel, Užice, Serbia

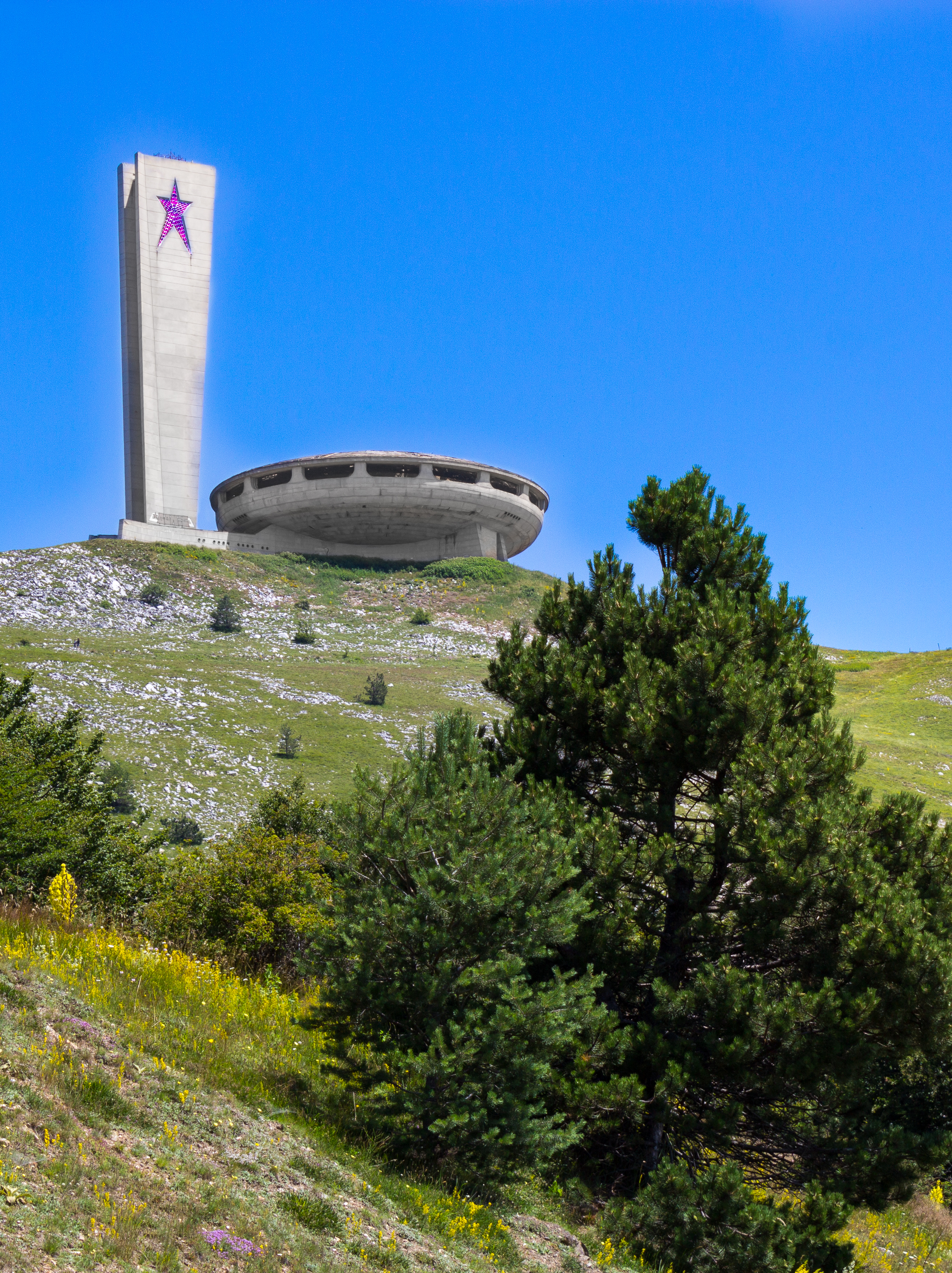
Buzludzha monument (1981), Bulgaria

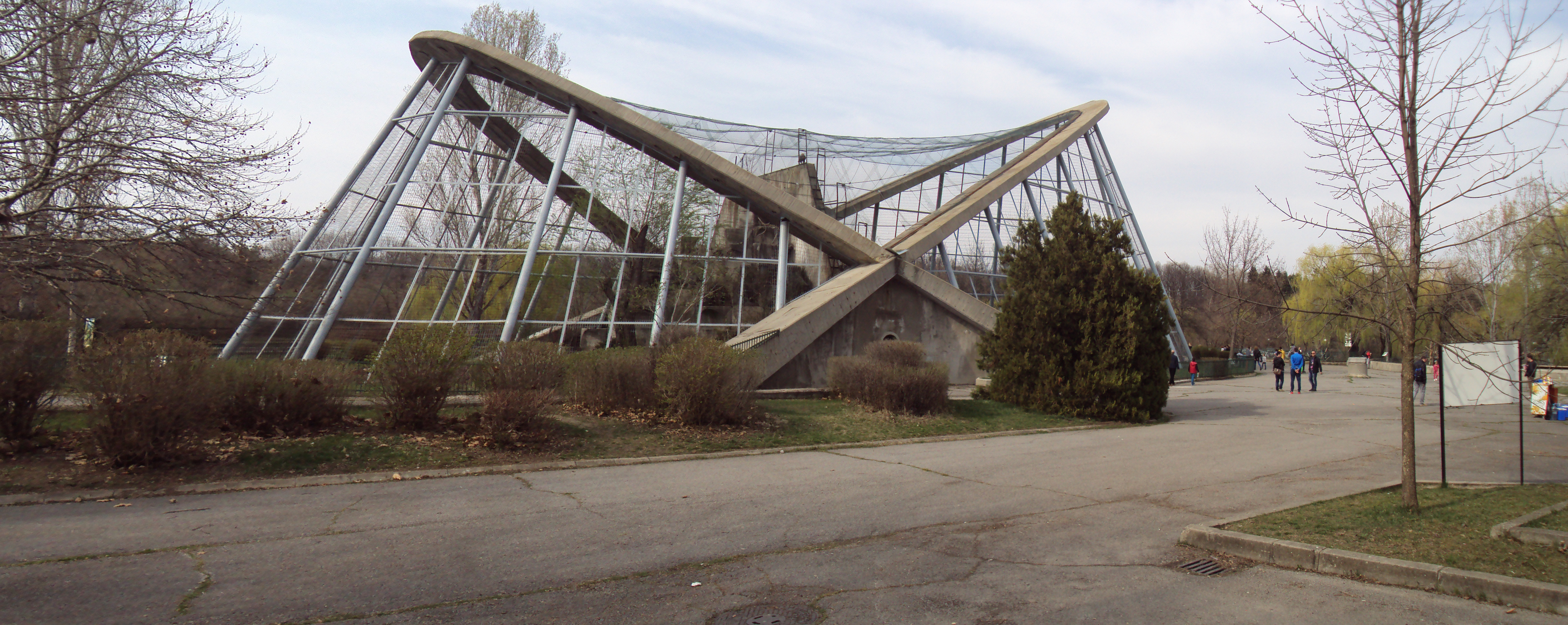
The big aviary at Sofia Zoo (1982), Bulgaria

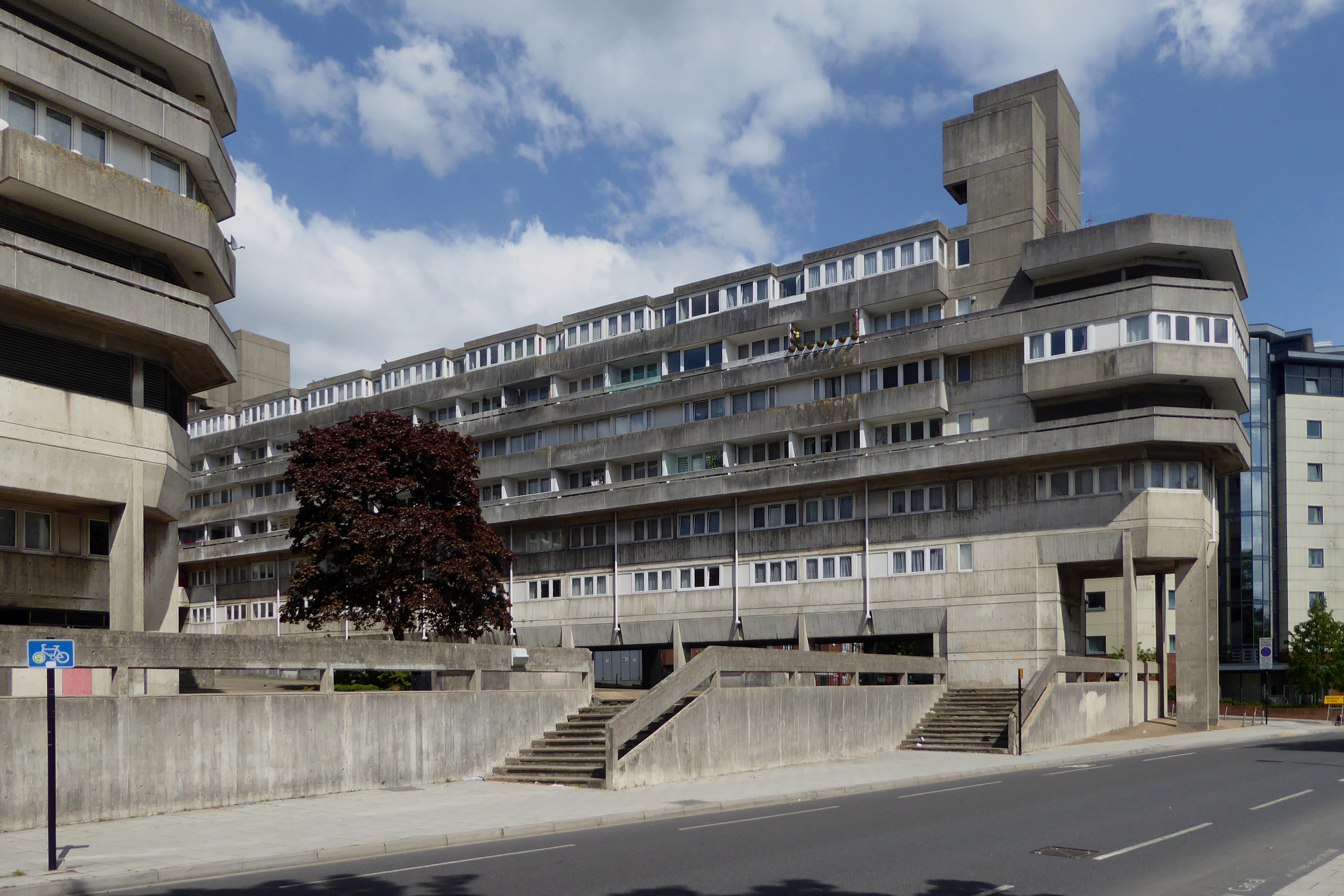
Wyndham Court, Southampton, United Kingdom

== See also ==
- Panel building – many of which are large and constructed of bare concrete panels.
- Panelák – a panel building constructed of pre-fabricated, pre-stressed concrete which may resemble brutalist structures.
- Plattenbau – as above but in Germany
