= Wahbi al-Hariri =

Syrian-American artist, architect, and archaeologist (1914–1994)

Wahbi al-Hariri-Rifai وهبي الحريري آلرفاعي
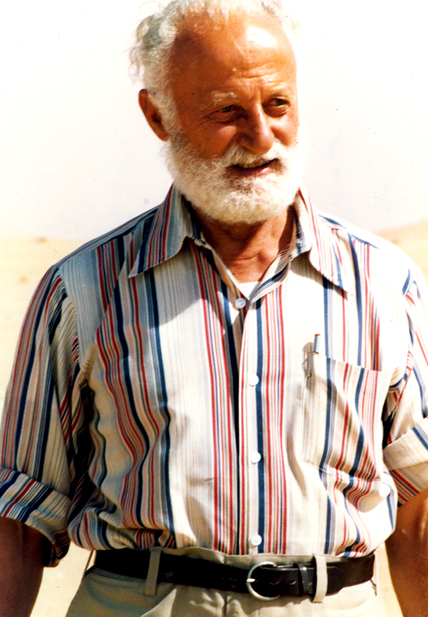
- Wahbi al-Hariri-Rifai in 1981
- Born: Mohamed Wahbi āl al-Hariri al-Rifai; Arabic: محمد وهبي آل الحريري الرفاعي; 1914; Aleppo, Syria, Ottoman Empire
- Died: 16 August 1994 (aged 80); Aleppo, Syria
- Education: Reale Accademia di Belle Arti; Istituto di Archeologia e Storia dell'Arte; Scuola Archeologica Italiana di Atene; École des Beaux-Arts; École du Louvre
- Known for: Art; Architecture; Archaeology
- Movement: Luminism; Realism; Classicism
- Spouse: Widad Marachi (m. 1944–1994)

Wahbi al-Hariri-Rifai (Arabic: وهبي الحريري آلرفاعي; 1914 – 16 August 1994) was a Syrian American artist. He was also an accomplished architect, archaeologist, and author. His artwork has garnered international recognition and praise both in his lifetime and posthumously.

He has also been recognized as a significant Middle Eastern cultural pioneer for his role in the "establishment of the foundations of the Plastic arts movement" in the Levant and for mentoring many important Arab artists.

== Early life ==
=== Family ===
Wahbi al-Hariri was born in 1914 in Aleppo, Syria. His documented family tree spans over fourteen centuries and lists several notable ancestors including Al-Hariri of Basra, the 11th-century poet, philosopher, and linguist known for authoring the Maqamat al-Hariri; Ali al-Hariri-Rifa'i, the 13th-century Sufi theologian known for founding the Syrian Rifai order; Mustapha al-Hariri-Rifai, the 18th-century composer and theologian; and Abdelrahman al-Hariri-Rifai the 19th-century calligrapher and astronomer.

=== Formative years in Rome ===
Wahbi al-Hariri began drawing and sculpting as a child and had "inherent artistic talent and a consuming interest in the world around him". Recognizing his talent, his father supported his artistic development and encouraged him to travel to Italy in 1932 to formally study art. Al-Hariri was among the first contemporary students from the Middle East to train at the Reale Accademia di Belle Arti in Rome, one of the oldest and most important academies of fine arts in Italy.

In Rome, al-Hariri trained under Carlo Siviero, a prominent Academic artist. Carlo, who was president of the Accademia di San Luca and a member of the Consiglio Superiore di Belle Arti, became al-Hariri's mentor and a lifelong friend; they would remain in touch until Carlo's death in 1953. Al-Hariri also simultaneously studied archaeology and preservation at the Istituto Nazionale di Archeologia e Storia dell'Arte and from 1937 to 1939 participated in archaeological research and study in Greece. The Alta Cultura course that he attended on the island of Rhodes is that of Luigi Pernier fame.

According to notable art critic and author Helen Khal, the years that al-Hariri spent in Italy training were:

... intense and productive. It was academic training at its best, drawing from models, sometimes spending months on one charcoal study, copying the masters in museums, learning everything there was to know about the history and practice of art and archaeology.

== Career ==
=== Early art and archaeology in Syria ===
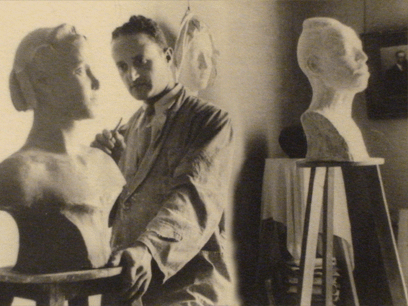
Al-Hariri in his atelier in Aleppo, Syria, 1938.

After returning to Syria in 1937 he taught art at the al-Mamoun (Tajhis al Oula) in Aleppo and also maintained a vibrant studio which also grew to be an intellectual hub. He taught periodic academy-style classes at his atelier, and organized and held gallery exhibitions with other Aleppine artists. There, he also hosted salons that attracted many contemporary philosophers and political thinkers. His work from that period included sculpture, oil painting, and photography.

As an art professor, he mentored future artists such as Fathi Kabbawah, Fateh Moudarres, Louay Kayyali, Ghaleb Salem, and Taleb Yazji; al-Hariri and his protégés are considered pioneers of the Nahda, the Levant's contemporary cultural and arts renaissance. According to Fateh Moudarres, whose surrealist work has earned international recognition, Al-Hariri was an influential mentor who nurtured Moudarres's formal technique and artistic style as well as enriched Moudarre's worldview:

Wahbi Al-Hariri taught me elegance in drawing, how you should look at things with respect and pursue them accordingly, and the exact order of the universe. Indeed, it was a great opportunity, for I was taught at the hands of expert professors.

In addition to teaching and practicing art in Aleppo, al-Hariri also became actively engaged in archeology and was "appointed Inspector General of Historic Monuments and Sites." One of his early victories, as chronicled by French archaeologist and assyriologist Raymond-Jacques Tournay, O.P., was the retrieval of the stele of Tukulti-Ninurta II.

According to Amer Moubayyed, an Aleppo historian, Wahbi al-Hariri:

...preserved important archaeological sites throughout the country; he was not only a successful artist and professor, but was also a patriot ... and a great artist who contributed to the renaissance of Arab art and was a great influence on many of his students ...in 1940 he undertook the carving of the commemorative medallion of Dr. Reda Said, the founder of the Damascus University Faculties—which still prominently occupies the [wall above the] central landing of the grand staircase ... and in 1946 he directed the archaeological missions at Tel Mari and Ra's Shamra. As the books on concerning Ebla indicate, this distinguished artist also directed the preservation of that archaeological site.

Wahbi al-Hariri was an outspoken critic of the French occupation of Syria and "would often demonstrate against the French such that in March 1941 he was arrested by the French colonial forces and detained for forty days." Undeterred, he maintained his objections and, in retaliation, French colonial forces set fire to his studio destroying much of his paintings and sculptures before a scheduled exhibition of his work.

=== Paris and the Beaux-Arts ===
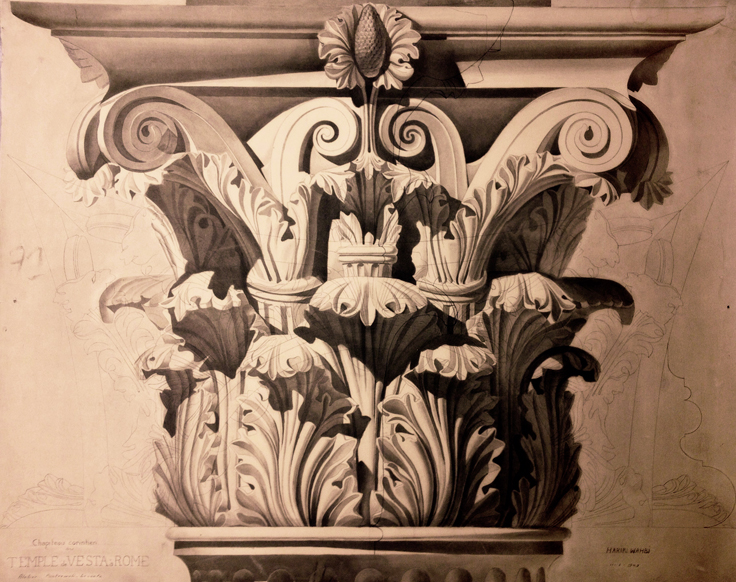
Chapiteau Corinthien au Temple de Vesta à Rome, Wahbi al-Hariri, 1945. This drawing of a Corinthian capital from the Temple of Vesta in Rome was submitted by al-Hariri as part of his application for admission to the Beaux-Arts. Visible below the title at bottom left is the designation, in script, "Atelier Pontremoli-Leconte".

In 1948, two years after Syria's independence from France, "his talent won him a scholarship to study architecture at Yale University, but his artistic drive took him to Paris" instead to study art and architecture at the École nationale supérieure des Beaux-Arts, as well as conservation and historic preservation at the École du Louvre. At the Beaux-Arts he was taught by Prix de Rome laureates Emmanuel Pontremoli and André Leconte with whom he would remain friends.

In 1954 Wahbi al-Hariri received his architectural DPLG with honors and was awarded the Prix du Meilleur Diplôme by the Société des Architectes Diplômés par le Gouvernement. The award, presented with a medal struck in bronze—which was designed for the société in 1896 by Louis Bottée—was bestowed annually upon the preeminent graduating student of architecture.

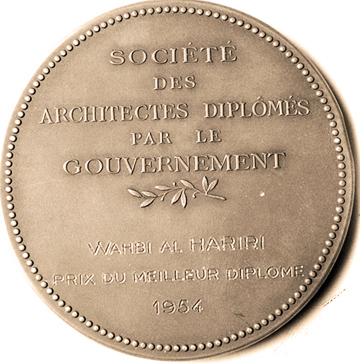
Al-Hariri's Prix du Meilleur Diplôme medal. Other notable winners include British architect Nicholas Grimshaw who was a recipient in 1965.

=== Return to Syria ===
Shortly after graduating from the Beaux-Arts he won the 1954 international competition for the design of the national broadcast headquarters in Damascus. Later that year he was named architecte en chef, chief architect, of the Directorate-General of Antiquities and Museums in Damascus. During this time, in addition to his art atelier, he maintained a successful architectural practice and organized archaeological and historic preservation initiatives. His architectural work in the 1950s is recognized as influential in contemporary Levant architecture. Alexander Prokhorov cites that "architects such as Wahbi Al-Hariri sought solutions that would reconcile modern industrial designs with national forms." He designed several large projects in the 1950s. In 1956 he won the design of the Adnan al-Malki memorial in the heart of Damascus. By 1959 his reputation had grown such that he was invited by the Association of German Architects and Engineers to lecture on contemporary Syrian art and architecture at the universities of Bonn, Hanover, Hamburg, Berlin, and Frankfurt.

His watercolors and drawings from this period document his numerous trips around the country and "reflect his vision of a region on the verge of dramatic change."

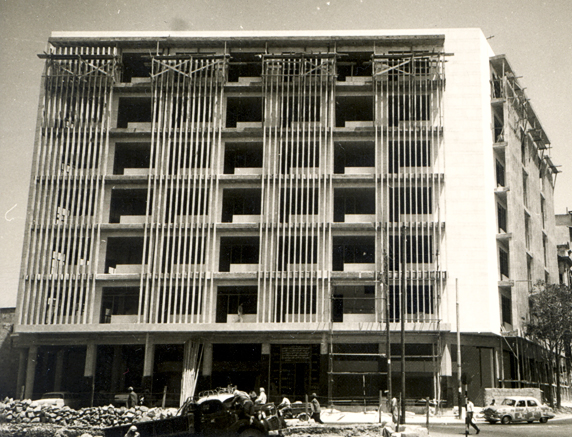
The 1964 Lawyers Association Credit Union, in Aleppo, was al-Hariri's last major project in Syria.

In 1962 al-Hariri won an important commission to renovate the historic Khalid ibn al-Walid Mosque, in Homs, and design its surrounding plaza. The 1960s in Syria, however, were marked by national unease and political instability and in 1963 a military coup caused the cancellation of a large exhibition of his artwork.

As frustrations with the political climate in Syria grew, King Faisal extended al-Hariri an invitation to Saudi Arabia in 1964. The following year al-Hariri moved to the Kingdom and was appointed chief architect of the Ministry for Public Works.

=== Exploring Arabia ===
Al-Hariri's first major commission in Saudi Arabia was the 1965 design of an extensive master-plan for the new campus of the university in Medina which was executed under his supervision. His design made allowance for future growth and has informed the university's expansions over the years. In his capacity as chief architect, al-Hariri designed and led projects all over the Kingdom. As he traveled throughout the country, al-Hariri grew increasingly interested in the history and culture of Arabia. In the late 1960s the many facets of the Arabian Peninsula's heritage were unknown and, as is possible with fast-paced development, were in danger. Al-Hariri resolved to preserve and document the kingdom's traditional architectural and artistic heritage and in the 1970s he embarked on explorations throughout the region to "document the diversity of architectural styles, building materials and geographic regions that exist in Saudi Arabia." After years of travel and research, "Al-Hariri produced a collection of superb drawings that has been hailed as one of the finest records of Saudi Arabia's architectural past", wrote Helen Khal; his "drawings are more than illustrations of old buildings and historical monuments. They reveal a devotional bond between artist and subject in a creative process." The drawings were the product of "intensive travel throughout the kingdom to draw on location. For months at a time, he would travel to remote towns and villages, carrying with him only his art supplies."

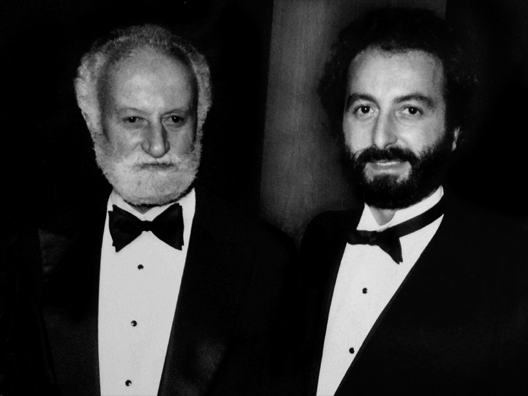
Wahbi al-Hariri-Rifai and son, Mokhless, Washington, D.C., in 1982.

In 1981, with the completion of his important collection of drawings, a full-size facsimile edition of this collection, titled Traditional Architecture in the Kingdom of Saudi Arabia, was published in Florence, Italy, by Fratelli Alinari Istituto di Edizioni Artistiche with the assistance of al-Hariri's son, Mokhless, a Washington, D.C. architect and also a graduate of the Beaux-Arts.

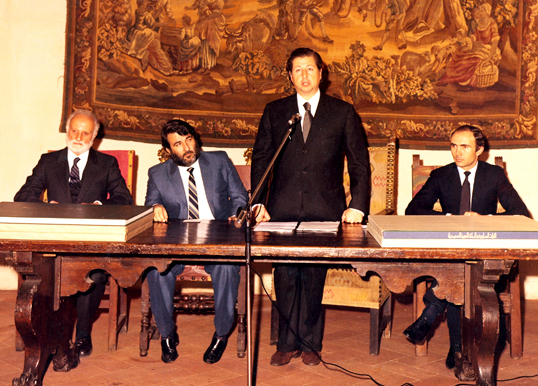
Al-Hariri, far left, at the Palazzo Strozzi, Florence, 1981, at a book launch presentation organized by his publisher, Fratelli Alinari.

In 1982 the massive book was first presented to King Khalid of Saudi Arabia.

Copies of the book can also be found in the collections of The Library of Congress, the Royal Library at Buckingham Palace, the library of Emperor Akihito of Japan, the Bibliothèque nationale de France, as well as several other libraries worldwide. The publication of this hand-printed art collector's folio brought about worldwide recognition of his artistic work. Select drawings were exhibited at several American venues, including the 1982 World's Fair and the Southern Arts Federation. The exhibition tour culminated with a 1984 solo exhibition of the collection at the Smithsonian Institution in Washington, D.C. With it, he became the first living artist to be honored with a solo show at the Smithsonian. The exhibition was curated by Esin Atıl, PhD, then curator of Islamic arts at the Smithsonian's Freer Gallery of Art. The complete collection of drawings, which never before had all been publicly shown, were exhibited from 10 October to 7 November 1984 at the Smithsonian castle.

Esin Atıl explains that "inasmuch as some of the buildings depicted are no longer standing" the significance of the drawings is that they "provide a permanent record of the buildings' existence" and as such they "preserve a historical record of the architecture of Saudi Arabia."

Washington Post critic Benjamin Forgey, whose full-length feature of al-Hariri's exhibit ran on 22 October 1984, writes that:

We are given a privileged look at such villages, and other extraordinary manifestations of traditional Saudi architecture, in sensitive pencil drawings by Wahbi Hariri-Rifai ... His Beaux-Arts training shows in the enormous skill with which he draws ... A modern scholar might be content with photographs, especially in areas where mid-afternoon temperatures rise beyond 110 degrees Fahrenheit, but Hariri-Rifai obviously believes that there is something more to be learned—absorbed, really—in the patient exercise of hand and pencil upon a blank sheet of paper. This conviction is our good fortune, for the drawings combine an archaeologist's respect for the facts with an artist's sensitivity to the spirit of a place.

This period in Saudi Arabia was integral and "he developed his unique style and excelled in the use of graphite." Atil explains that "By mastering this monochromatic medium, he absolved himself from conforming to coloristic expressions." she also remarks that "graphite was at once strong enough to reflect his artistic passion, yet gentle and lyrical enough to express his emotions and spirit."

==== Books on Saudi Arabia ====
During his time in Saudi Arabia al-Hariri also published two other books that documented Saudi Arabia's culture and heritage, Asir: Heritage and Civilization, published in 1987, and The Heritage of the Kingdom of Saudi Arabia, published in 1990. Both featured "extensive" color photography and were co-authored with al-Hariri's son, Mokhless. Many sites documented by the books have been subject to changes from development, vandalism, or other external influences and as such the book has been used as a primary source for studies of ancient Arabian history. The Heritage of the Kingdom of Saudi Arabia was the product of "15 years of travel ... as well as the product of an endless cycle of research, review, and evaluation." The book was featured in reviews by national newspapers, such as the Los Angeles Times and the Atlanta Journal-Constitution.

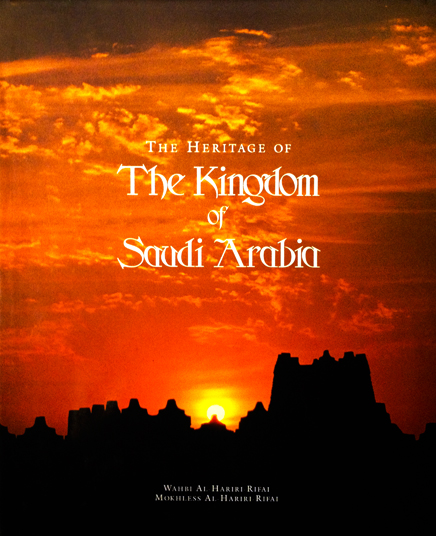
The Heritage of the Kingdom of Saudi Arabia by Wahbi and Mokhless al-Hariri-Rifai, 1990.

The Washington Times review of the book describes that

The senior Al-Hariri-Rifai traces the history of the region and the development of the Arabic architectural styles, while his son's photos offer a colorful, compelling view of the scenery.

In 1991, in addition to other international citations and honors, France further recognized his artistic achievements by awarding him the highly regarded distinction of chevalier of the French Ordre des Arts et des Lettres.

== Last years ==
=== Final work, from Spain to China ===
With the "active participation of his wife, Widad Marachi and the earnest encouragement H.R.H. Crown Prince Salman bin Abdulaziz, then governor of Riyadh, and numerous dignitaries" he was inspired to travel "from Washington, D.C. to Riyadh, and from Spain to China" to identify and document many significant historic mosques of the world.

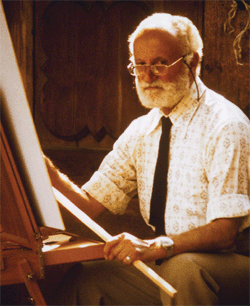
Wahbi al-Hariri, 1982.

During the last four years of his life while battling cancer, his spiritual drive and artistic talent inspired him to travel around the world to compile images of the Spiritual Edifices of Islam. ... Nonetheless, remarkably he completed close to 100 paintings and drawings within this period that embodied the final evolution of his distinctive classical style.

The finished collection, completed with the help of al-Hariri's son, was ultimately assembled posthumously in 1994 and was named The Spiritual Edifices of Islam as per the artist's wishes.

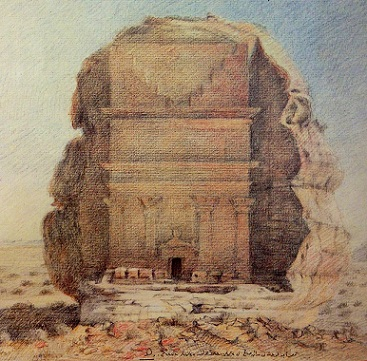
A drawing by Wahbi al-Hariri-Rifai titled Qasr abu Lawha. Drawn on site at Mada'in Saleh, Saudi Arabia, (1979).

=== Death and legacy ===
After a long struggle with cancer, Wahbi al-Hariri-Rifai, "known as the last of the classicists, died ... at the age of 80" on 16 August 1994, in Aleppo, the birthplace he had not visited for over twenty years. Dr. Esin Atil notes that until the end he overtly maintained an optimistic view of his condition and remained driven and "inspired by an unyielding thirst for knowledge and constant search for beauty." A couple of streets in Aleppo were named in his honor after his death. The Swedish consulate in Aleppo is located on one of these streets, Mohamed Wahbi al-Hariri Street, in the Sebil Area. After his death, a large number of his early oil paintings, watercolors, and photographs—some dating back to 1933—were found, having been apparently saved from the initial studio fire that destroyed much of his other works of that period. After undergoing extensive restoration several pieces were included in a retrospective collection and were shown to the public as part of a travelling exhibition of al-Hariri's art.

According to Dr. Atil, Wahbi al-Hariri is referred to as "the last of the classicists because his work transcends time, period, and region." She explains that:

His work is meaningful to and understood by all peoples at different periods and regios, and in different cultural and ethnic traditions. ... his strokes are equally strong and soft, controlled and impressionistic, lyrical and passionate. [His works] display a technical virtuosity with a most difficult medium. His compositions are masterful and harmoniously balance the fills and voids. The overall impression is at once spontaneous and delicate, calculated and powerful.

The majority of his work is held by the family. His works can also be found in several private or national collections and are rarely exchanged or offered on the public market.

== Contemporary exhibitions ==
=== The Spiritual Edifices of Islam (traveling exhibit) ===
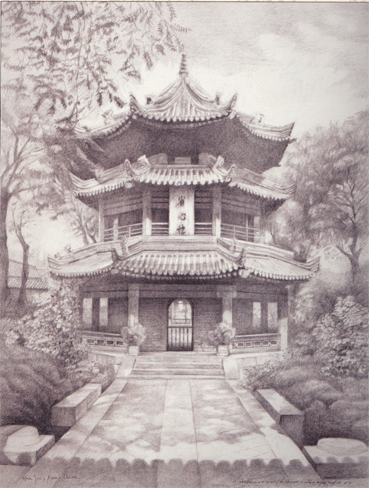
Al-Hariri's 1992 graphite drawing of the Great Mosque of Xi'an, Xi'an, Shaanxi, China.

Also known in Arabic as Buyut Allah Arabic: بيوت الله, the Spiritual Edifices of Islam traveling exhibit made its 1999 debut at the Smithsonian Institution in Washington, D.C. before an international tour that took the exhibit to many other significant world venues.

The Spiritual Edifices of Islam ... features 33 original graphite drawings by internationally acclaimed Arab-American artist Wahbi Al-Hariri-Rifai (1914–1994) depicting some of the world's most significant mosques. Also included in the exhibit are earlier works by the artist in watercolor and pastel.

"My last meeting with him was one month before his death" writer Lisa Kaaki recalled in an article she wrote for Arab News in 2002; she wrote that she "remembered the unique journey which took him from Spain to China, looking for the most significant mosques in the world." She expressed that she "was both relieved and deeply moved when [she] earned that the drawings of the mosques were part of an exhibition at the National Museum in Riyadh."

The international tour of al-Hariri's artwork featured two exhibition collections, The Spiritual Edifices of Islam historic mosques collection, and the Wahbi al-Hariri Artist Retrospective collection of 30 original oil, watercolor, and graphite pieces that form a broad retrospective of the artist's work. The retrospective collection spans a sixty-year period (1930s–1990s) and includes a special selection of works that al-Hariri completed in Canada, Egypt, France, Greece, Italy, Lebanon, Saudi Arabia, Syria, the United Arab Emirates, and the United States.

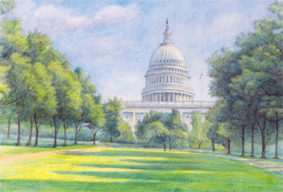
Al-Hariri's 1993 watercolor of the United States Capitol, on the National Mall, Washington, D.C.

==== Exhibit tour highlights ====
The Spiritual Edifices of Islam traveling exhibit toured many significant international museums:

Beit Al Quran Museum	Manama, Bahrain	September – October 2002
Islamic Arts Museum Malaysia	Kuala Lumpur, Malaysia	May – September 2002
National Museum of Saudi Arabia	Riyadh, Saudi Arabia	January – February 2002
Jordan National Gallery of Fine Arts	Amman, Jordan	November 2001 – January 2002
Arab Towns Organization	Doha, Qatar	March – April 2001
Smithsonian Institution	Washington, D.C., United States	October2001

At the Islamic Arts Museum Malaysia in Kuala Lumpur the exhibition was extended from one to four months in response to public interest.

=== From Washington To Riyadh (exhibition) ===
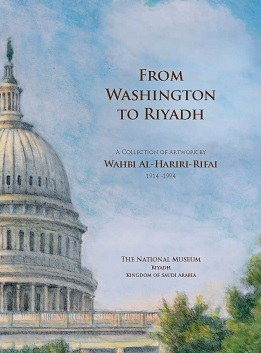
From Washington to Riyadh exhibition catalogue. National Museum of Saudi Arabia, Riyadh, 2012.

In May 2012, the National Museum of Saudi Arabia hosted an exhibition titled From Washington to Riyadh: A Collection of Artwork by Wahbi al-Hariri-Rifai. The exhibition featured "fifty graphite, watercolor, and pastel drawings depicting the architectural heritage of Saudi Arabia and historic monuments of Washington, D.C."

Many luminaries and high-profile guests attended the exhibition opening. Among those present, Dr. Janet Breslin-Smith, wife of United States ambassador James B. Smith, "expressed her pleasure to participate in the celebration of the works of Arab-American Artist Wahbi Al-Hariri"; she also noted that it was "the first time that the exhibition is held outside the United States of America since its inception in 1984 at Smithsonian Institution in Washington."

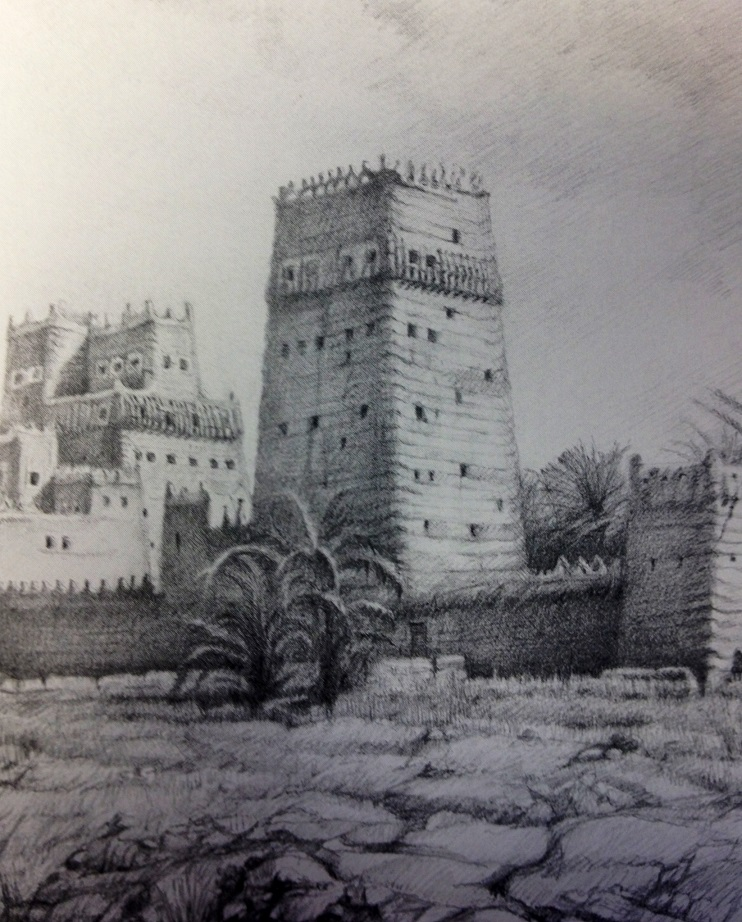
Drawing by Wahbi al-Hariri titled Home of Jaber bin Hussein bin Naseeb, Najran, Saudi Arabia, 1981. Graphite on paper..

Princess Adelah bint Abdullah bin Abdulaziz Al Saud, who was active in the exhibition's planning in her capacity as president of the museum's Consultative Committee of the National Museum was also present to officiate the opening. In her remarks she said that "The purpose of having this exhibition at the National Museum is to focus on [Al-Hariri's] artwork which reflects the deep-rooted culture of the Kingdom". "Art also represents the bridge of knowledge that links past and present", she explains, in her preface to the exhibition book, and that al-Hariri, whom she considers "an illustrious name in history's memory", was an artist "who closely observed the world around him and recorded it through his passion for art." According to the princess the exhibition From Washington to Riyadh is "a tribute to the prolific artistic journey of Wahbi Al-Hariri. It recognizes him as one of the great masters who left us exceptional legacies and whose art attests to their creativity and ability to express with sensitivity the beauty that surrounded him."

Dr. Abdulaziz Khoja, the Minister of Culture and Information of Saudi Arabia, writes, in his prefatory note, that:

This international artist has been acclaimed for his creative contributions to the fields of architecture, history, and antiquities as exemplified by his thorough documentation of the Kingdom's heritage and historic sites. The exhibition includes a valuable collection of drawings that document the architecture and heritage of the Kingdom and highlight significant landmarks in the US capital.

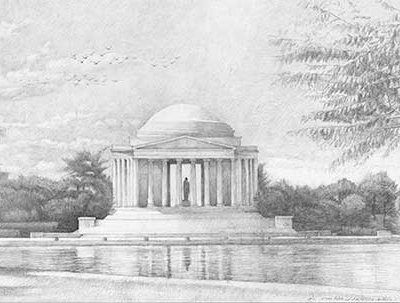
al-Hariri's drawing of the Jefferson Memorial, Washington, D.C., 1991.

The exhibition was sponsored in part by the United States Department of State through the Embassy of the United States in Riyadh and was considered by Ambassador Smith to have been a significant cultural exchange initiative.

== Bibliography ==
=== Books ===
- Traditional Architecture in the Kingdom of Saudi ArabiaLCCN 83-450071 OCLC 9322259, 220105709, 461796491, 431734649, 729119036, 165397518
- Asir: Heritage and Civilization OCLC 21917711, 122745999, 786718031
- The Heritage of the Kingdom of Saudi Arabia OCLC 23255261 LCCN 90-80042 ISBN 978-0-9624483-0-0

=== Exhibition catalogues ===
- Traditional Architecture of Saudi Arabia: Drawings by Wahbi al-Hariri-Rifai
  - Smithsonian Institution, Washington, D.C.
- The Spiritual Edifices of Islam OCLC 52923517 ISBN 978-0-9624483-1-7
- The Spiritual Edifices of Islam: Wahbi Hariri-RifaiOCLC 56990773
  - National Museum of Saudi Arabia, Riyadh.
- Mahligai Rohani Islam: Klasikisme yang terakhir OCLC 850890659 ISBN 978-983-2591-01-6
  - Islamic Arts Museum Malaysia, Kuala Lumpur.
- From Washington to Riyadh ISBN 978-0-9624483-4-8
  - National Museum of Saudi Arabia, Riyadh.
