= Kayyali =

Kayyali (also spelled Al-Kayyali, El-Kayyali, Al-Kayali, El-Kayali, Kayali, or Kayalı, Arabic: كيالي, or Arabic: الكيالي) is an Arabic and Turkish family name.

- Abdülkadir Kayalı (born 1991), Turkish footballer
- Abd al-Rahman al-Kayyali (1887–1969), former Syrian Minister of Justice
- Louay Kayyali (1934–1978), Syrian modern artist
