= Yusuf al-Khal =

Syrian-Lebanese poet (1917–1987

Yusuf al-Khal يوسف الخال
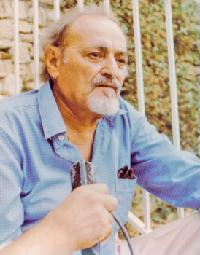
- Yusuf al-Khal
- Born: December 25, 1917; Amar al-Husn, Ottoman Syria, Ottoman Empire
- Died: March 9, 1987 (aged 69)
- Occupations: Poet, writer
- Writing career
- Language: Varieties of Arabic
- Genre: Prose poetry
- Movement: Avant-garde
- Website: yusufalkhal.com

Yusuf al-Khal (Arabic: يوسف الخال, romanized: Yūsuf al-Khāl; December 25, 1917 – March 9, 1987) was a Syrian-Lebanese poet, journalist, and publisher. He is considered the greatest exponent of avantgardist prose poetry (qaṣīdat al-natr) in the Arab world as well one of the pioneers of Arabic surrealist poetry.

With fellow poets Adonis and Ounsi el-Hajj, al-Khal founded the magazine Shi'r ("Poetry") in Beirut in 1957, initiating a movement to modernize Arabic literature. Al-Khal's poetry has been recognized in Near East poetry collections. He was also one of the first to translate English-language poets such as Walt Whitman, T. S. Eliot, and Robert Frost into Arabic.

== Early life and career ==
Yusuf Al-Khal was born on December 25, 1917 in Amar al-Husn, Syria, the son of a Syrian Protestant minister from Wadi al-Nasara and a Lebanese mother from Tripoli.

From 1944 to 1948, al-Khal taught at the American University in Beirut, where he had previously studied under Charles Malik and did his bachelor's degree in philosophy and English literature. He established the Dar al-Kitab in Beirut, and this house started its activities by publishing the magazine “Sawt a Woman”, which was edited by al-Khal, in addition to managing the house until 1948.

From 1948 to 1955 al-Khal lived in the US, where he worked for the United Nations as a journalist in the press and publishing department. He returned to Lebanon in 1955.

Al-Khal created the quarterly poetry magazine Shi'r that was published between 1957 and 1964. Then it resumed in the first of 1967. Its entire collection was reprinted in 11 volumes. In 1967, An-Nahar Publishing House was established, and he joined it as Editor-in-Chief. He established (1957–1959) a remarkable literary salon, the Salon of Poetry Magazine, known as the Salon of Thursday. The members of the salon included the poets Yusuf Al-Khal, Adonis, Shawqi Abi Chakra and Fouad Rebekah.

== Personal life ==
Al-Khal married Lebanese-American painter Helen Khal, daughter of Thomas Joseph and Salma Sassine Chaiboub, with whom he had sons Tarek and Jawad. Following their divorce he married the Syrian artist Maha Bayrakdar in 1970. Maha was a well-known painter in Damascus and she worked for several years in Lebanese media. They had two children, Yusuf and Ward, who later became popular TV stars.

== Selection of works ==
=== His own works ===
- Al-ḥurriyya (Freedom). 1944.
- Hīrūdia. Play. 1954.
- Al-biʾr al-mahǧūra (The dried up well). 1958.
- Qasāʾid fī l-arbaʿīn. 1960.
- Al-aʿmāl aš-šiʿriyya al-kāmila (1938–1968) (Poetic Complete Works). 1973.
- Rasāʾil ilā Dūn Kishūt (Letters to Don Quixote). 1979.
- Al-wilādat ath-thāniya (The rebirth). 1981.
- Al-hadātha fī š-šiʿr (The youth / novelty in the lyric). 1978.
- Dafātir al-ayyām (diaries). 1987.

=== Translations ===
- Khalil Gibran: The Prophet. 1968.
- TS Eliot: The Destroyed Earth. 1958
- Anthology of American Poems. 1958.
- Carl Sandburg: Abraham Lincoln. 1959.
- Robert Frost: Selected Poems. 1962.
- The new Testament. 1958.

=== Yusuf al-Khal translated in German ===
Some of his poems have appeared in collections in German, as in

- Suleman Taufiq (ed.): Neue arabische Poesie [New Arabic Poetry]. Munich 2004, ISBN 3-423-13262-0

== Featured works ==
- al-Khal, Yusuf. The Flag of Childhood: Poems from The Middle East. In: Naomi Shihab Nye (ed.) The Deserted Well . New York: Aladdin, 1998. p. 76.

== See also ==
- Syrian literature
