= Grande Masse des Beaux-Arts =

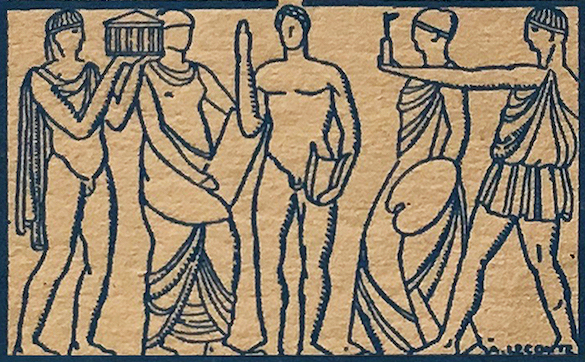
Logo of the GMBA, designed by André Leconte in 1929.

The Grande Masse des Beaux-Arts (Note: Referring to the four fine arts taught at Paris' École des Beaux-Arts until 1968, namely painting, sculpture, architecture and engraving) or Grande Masse is the association of students and alumni of the École Nationale Supérieure des Beaux-Arts and Écoles Nationales Supérieures d'Architecture.

Founded as an association on 12 January 1926, it deposited its statutes eight days later and had its decree on 20 December the same year. Recognised as a utilité publique in 1932, its aim is to create and support links of solidarity between all students and former students and to improve conditions for its members.

It was a central association for student life from 1926 to 1968, organising the École des Beaux-Arts' social life. Since the suppression of the architecture section in the Beaux-Arts by decree number 68-1097 on 6 December 1968, which dealt with the provisional organisation of architecture teaching, the Grande Masse mainly includes architecture students and alumni.

The person elected to preside over the association is called Grande Massière or Grand Massier.

== Organisation and function ==
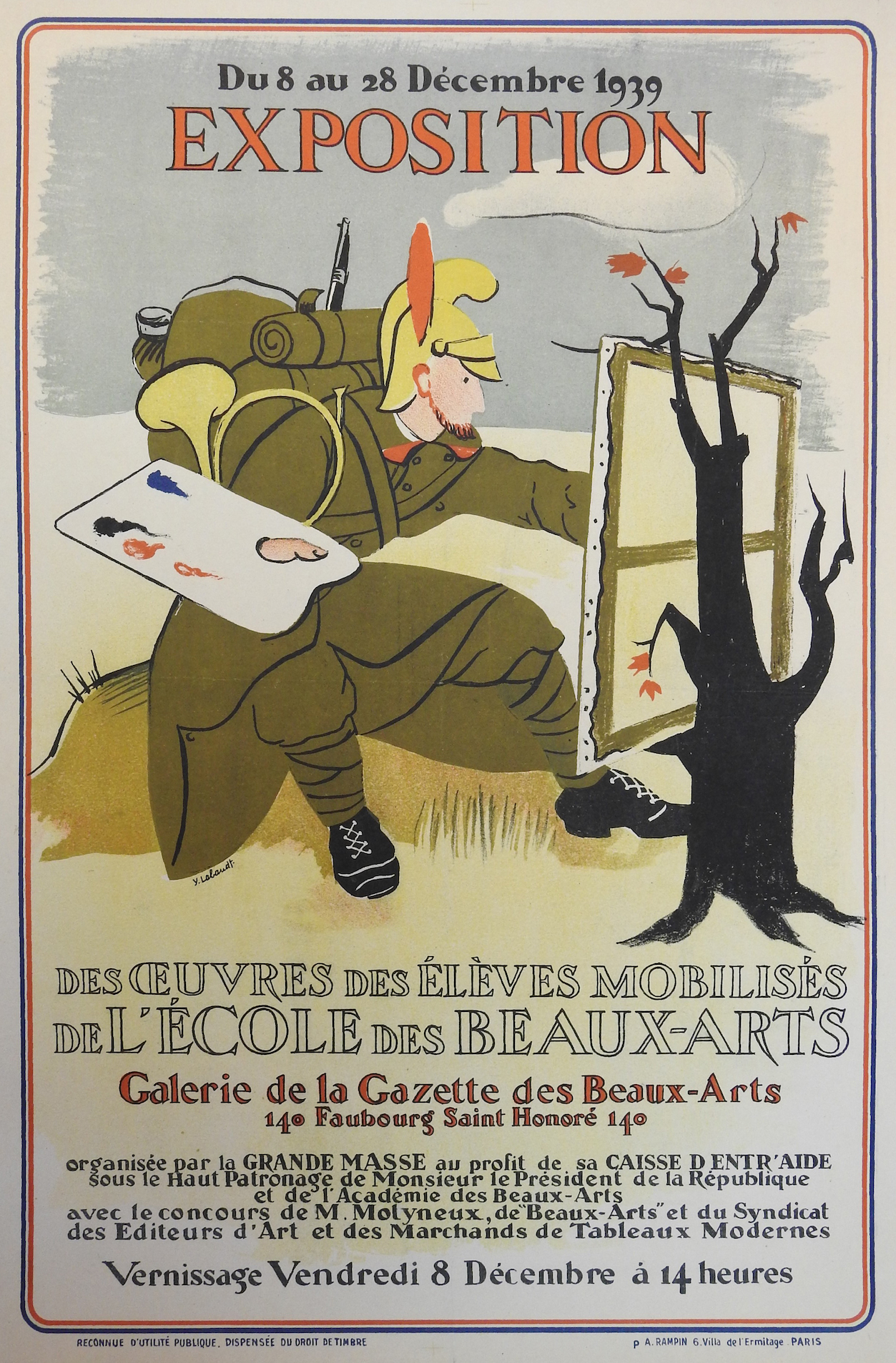
Exhibition organised by the GMBA.

=== Logo ===
In 1929, André Leconte, head of the architecture teaching studio and winner of the prix de Rome in 1927, designed the association's logo. To symbolise the broad scope of its activities, he chose five figures of the major arts, namely (from left to right) architecture, poetry, music, painting and sculpture or according to G. W. F. Hegel's classification architecture, sculpture, painting, music and poetry.

== Roles ==
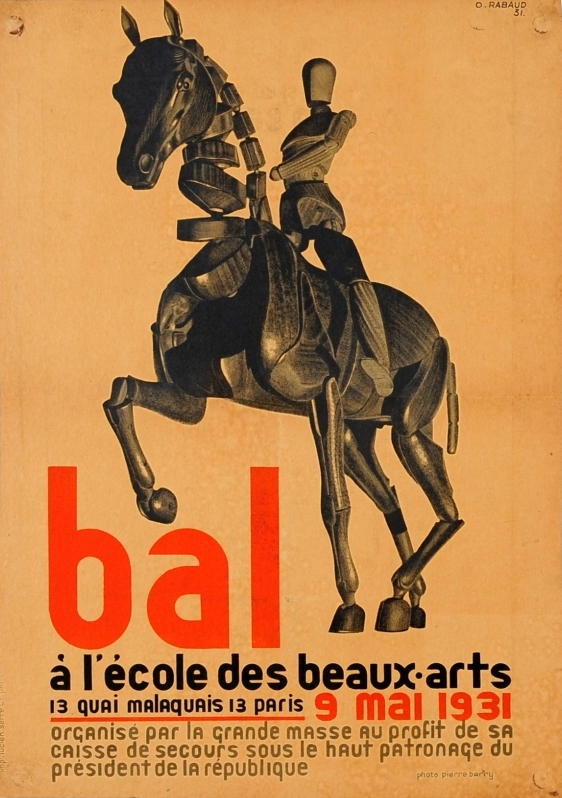
Gala poster, 1931.

=== Callot building (1933) ===
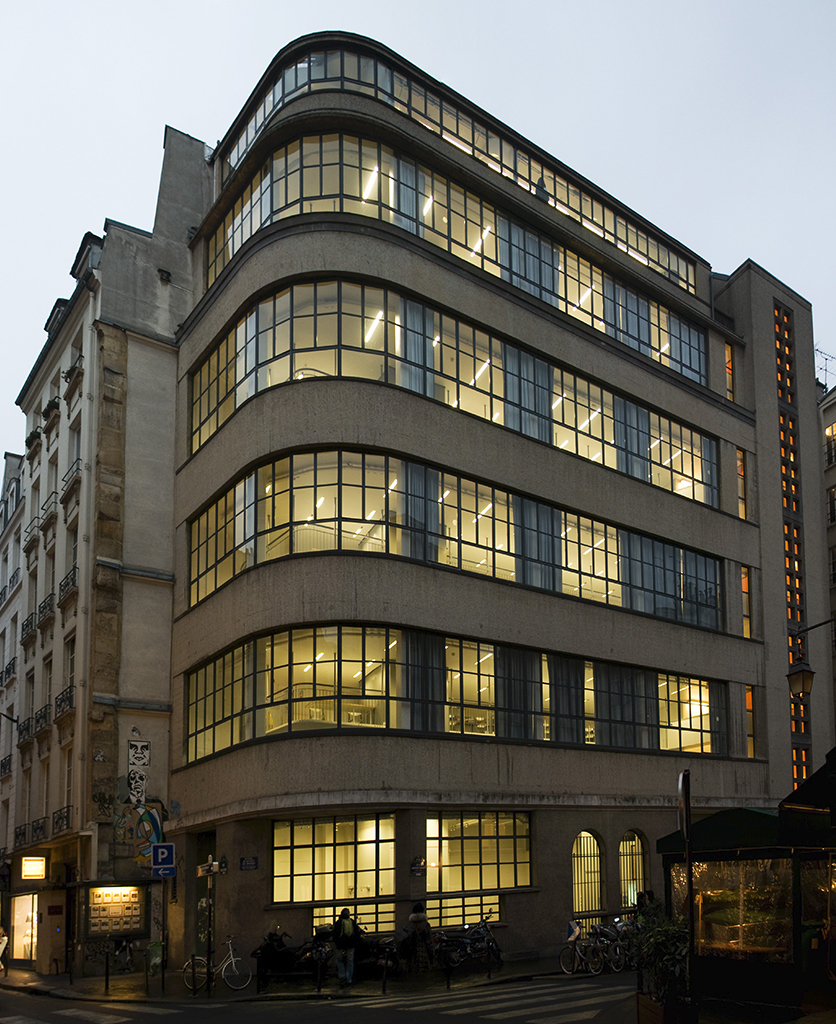
Callot building.

== Publications ==
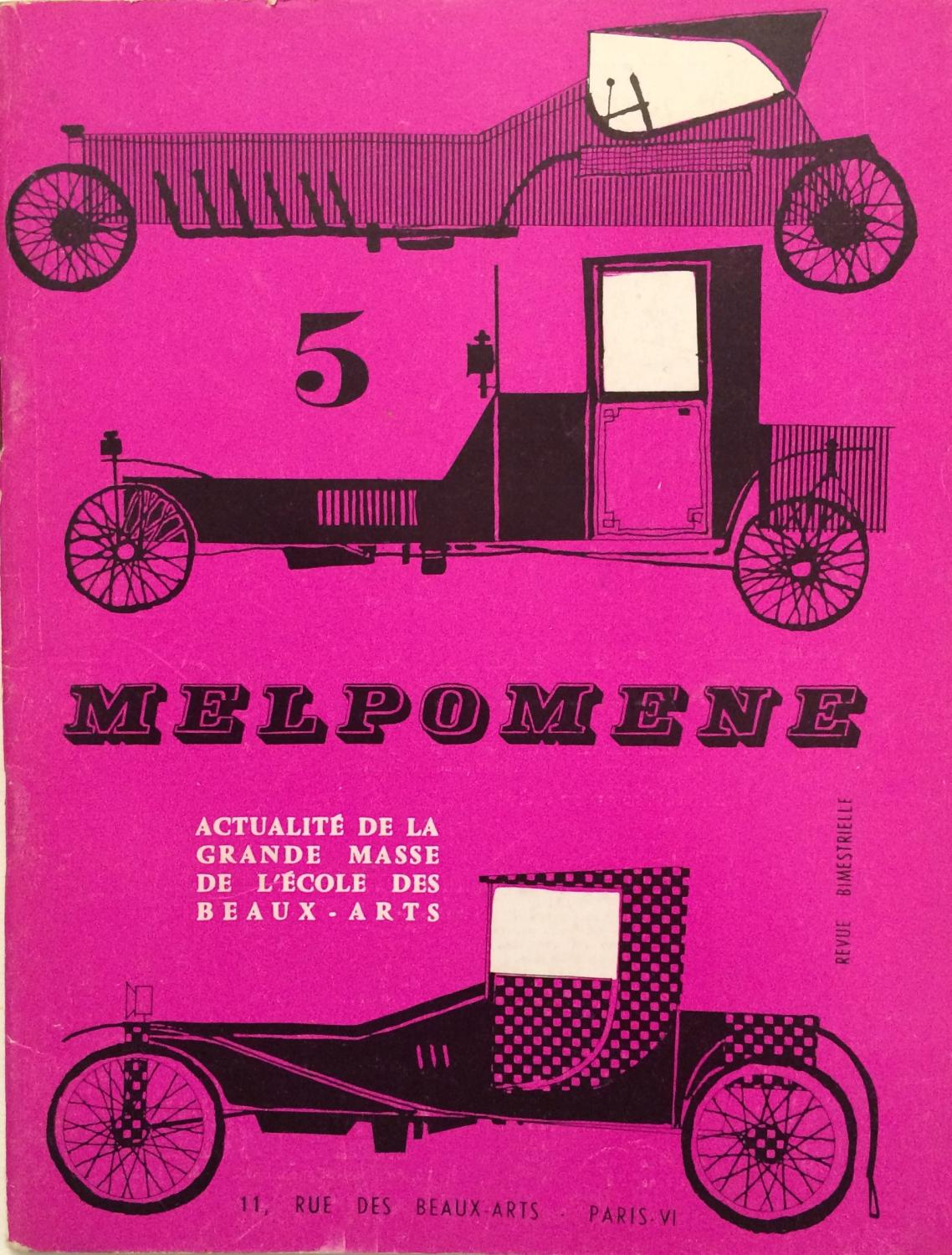
Bulletin Melpomène no. 5, 1959.

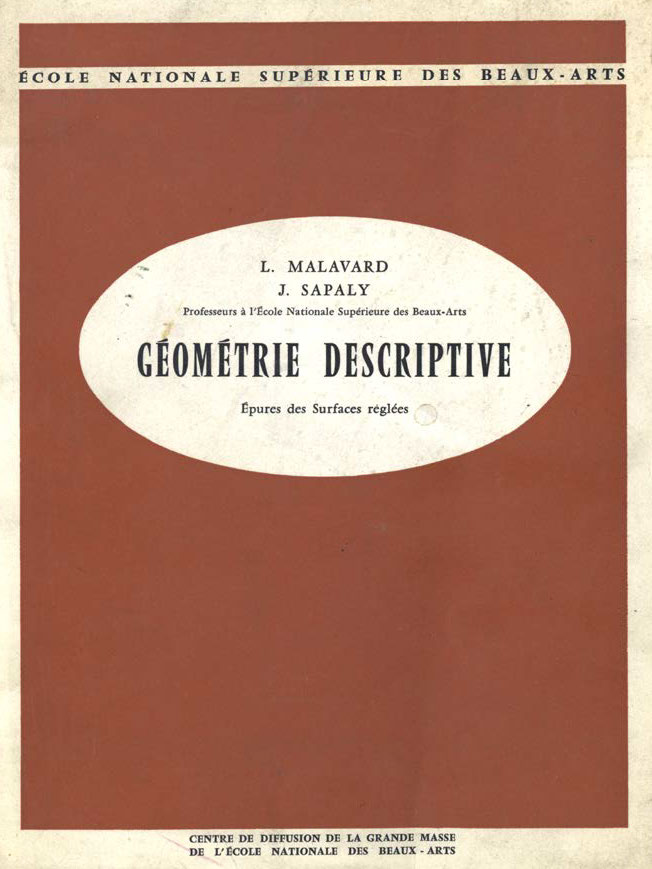
GMBA coursebook.

== Bibliography (in French) ==
=== Works ===
- "Jean Margerand, « Les Ateliers extérieurs d'Architecture de l'École Nationale supérieure des Beaux-Arts », La Construction Moderne, revue hebdomadaire d'architecture, 48th year, no. 45, 6 August 1933, pp. 666-672".
- ENSBA, L'École nationale supérieure des Beaux-Arts, GMBA, Paris, 1937, 32 p.
- Marina Sauer, L'entrée des femmes à l'École des beaux-arts: 1880-1923, ENSBA, coll. « Beaux-arts histoire », Paris, 1990, 89 p. ISBN 9782903639723
- Musée de la coopération Franco-américaine, Le Voyage de Paris : les Américains dans les écoles d'art, 1868-1918, RMN, Paris, 1990, 85 p . ISBN 9782711823703
- Annie Jacques, dir., Les Beaux-Arts, de l'Académie aux Quat'z'arts, anthologie historique et littéraire, ENSBA, Paris, 2001 ISBN 9782840560968
- Michel Day, Charrette, Édité à compte d'auteur, Paris, 2001, 150 p.
- Jean-Michel Leniaud et Béatrice Bouvier, dir. Les périodiques d'architecture, XVIII-XX siecles : recherche d'une méthode critique d’analyse, École nationale des Chartes, Paris, 2001, 321 p. ISBN 2900791421
- Emmanuel Schwartz, Les sculptures de l'École des Beaux-Arts de Paris. Histoire, doctrines, catalogue, Paris, ENSBA, 2004, 232 p. ISBN 978-2840561354
- Tellier, Thibault (2007). "Jean-Louis Violeau, Les Architectes et Mai 68, Paris, Recherches, 2005, 476 p.". Histoire Urbaine. 20 (3): 173–174. doi:10.3917/rhu.020.0173.
- René Beudin, Charrette au cul les nouvôs ! Le parler des architectes, Éditions Horay, coll. « Cabinet de curiosité », Paris, 2006, 104 p. ISBN 2705804382
- Max Querrien, Pour une politique de l’architecture. Témoignage d’un acteur (1960-1990), Le Moniteur, Paris, 2008, 240 p. ISBN 978-2281193985
- Pommier, Juliette (2010). "Juliette Pommier, « La revue Melpomène(1958-1966) : l'architecture chez les étudiants des Beaux-Arts », Société & Représentation, n° 30, février 2010, pp. 157-172". Sociétés & Représentations. 30 (2): 157–172. doi:10.3917/sr.030.0157.
- Michel Denès, « Gazettes, fanzines, bulletins, cahiers, journaux. Les publications introuvables des écoles d'architecture en France (1965–2005) », EAV, 2010, pp. 99–100
- Guy Fichez, Le cru des Beaux-Arts, récoltes 1964 et suivantes, Edilivre, 2013, 414 p. ISBN 9782332561671
- Véronique Flanet, La belle histoire des fanfares des Beaux-Arts, L'Harmattan, 2015, 250 p. ISBN 978-2-343-06353-9
- "Isabelle Conte et Christophe Samoyault-Muller, « La Grande Masse de l'École des Beaux-Arts (1926-1968) : histoire d'une association fédératrice », HEnsA20, Cahier no. 7, November 2019, pp. 11-17".
- Conte, Isabelle (15 June 2018). "Isabelle Conte, « Les femmes et la culture d'atelier à l'École des Beaux-Arts », Livraisons de l'histoire de l'architecture, no. 35, 2018, pp. 87-98". Livraisons de l'Histoire de l'Architecture (35): 87–98. doi:10.4000/lha.956.
- Diener, Amandine (5 July 2018). "Amandine Diener, « Relire Mai 68 et l'enseignement de l'architecture. La longue gestation d'une crise », Métropolitiques, on metropolitiques.eu, 5 July 2018". Métropolitiques.

=== Archives ===
- Archives de la Grande Masse des Beaux-Arts, association loi 1901, ses bulletins, correspondances et publications, dont :
  - Georges Huisman, « Nouveaux rapports de l’art et de l’État », Bulletin de la Grande Masse de l’École des Beaux-Arts, 1937, n^{o} 110-111, 148 p. ISSN 0995-8843
  - La Grande Masse, « La réforme de l’enseignement », Melpomène, No. 13, mai-juin-juillet 1963 ISSN 2679-2982
- Archives de Montpellier, Fonds Marcel et Édouard Gallix, cote 37 S 9 : Melpo, revue de la Grande Masse de l'école des Beaux Arts
- Archives nationales :
  - Archives de l’École nationale supérieure des Beaux-Arts, références AJ/52/1 à AJ/52/1415, site de Pierrefite
  - ENSA-Paris la Villette, unité de description 20120112/1 à 20120112/214, Statuts juridiques des Unités Pédagogiques et des enseignants (1936-1983)
  - Fonds Paul Léon, unité de description 20140260/58, Association des anciens élèves de l’École nationale des Beaux-Arts dite « Grande Masse » (mai 1934)
  - Archives du Conseil d’État, unité de description 20060154/17, Affaire 316800 : modification des statuts de la GMBA (1976)

==== Articles ====
The Grande Masse des Beaux-Arts regularly publishes articles on its site under the title Brèves historiques, including :

- Christophe Samoyault-Muller, « L’École Nationale Supérieure des Beaux-Arts, les écoles d'architecture : Genèse et évolution de l'enseignement et des lieux d'enseignement », Brèves historiques, on grandemasse.org, May 2020
- Christophe Samoyault-Muller, « Les Grands Massiers : Présidentes et Présidents de 1925 à aujourd'hui », Brèves historiques, on grandemasse.org, October 2022
- Christophe Samoyault-Muller, « la Croix de guerre et la Légion d’honneur décernée à l'École », Brèves historiques, on grandemasse.org, November 2019
- Christophe Samoyault-Muller, « Le Pavillon de la Grande Masse à l'Expo Universelle de 1937 », on grandemasse.org, June 2019
- Christophe Samoyault-Muller, « Historique de la Grande Masse des Beaux-Arts », Brèves historiques, on grandemasse.org, September 2016
- Christophe Samoyault-Muller, « Le Bal de l’École nationale supérieure des Beaux-Arts ou Gala de la Grande Masse des Beaux-Arts », Brèves historiques, sur grandemasse.org, September 2016
