= Gérard Grandval =

French architect (1930–2021)

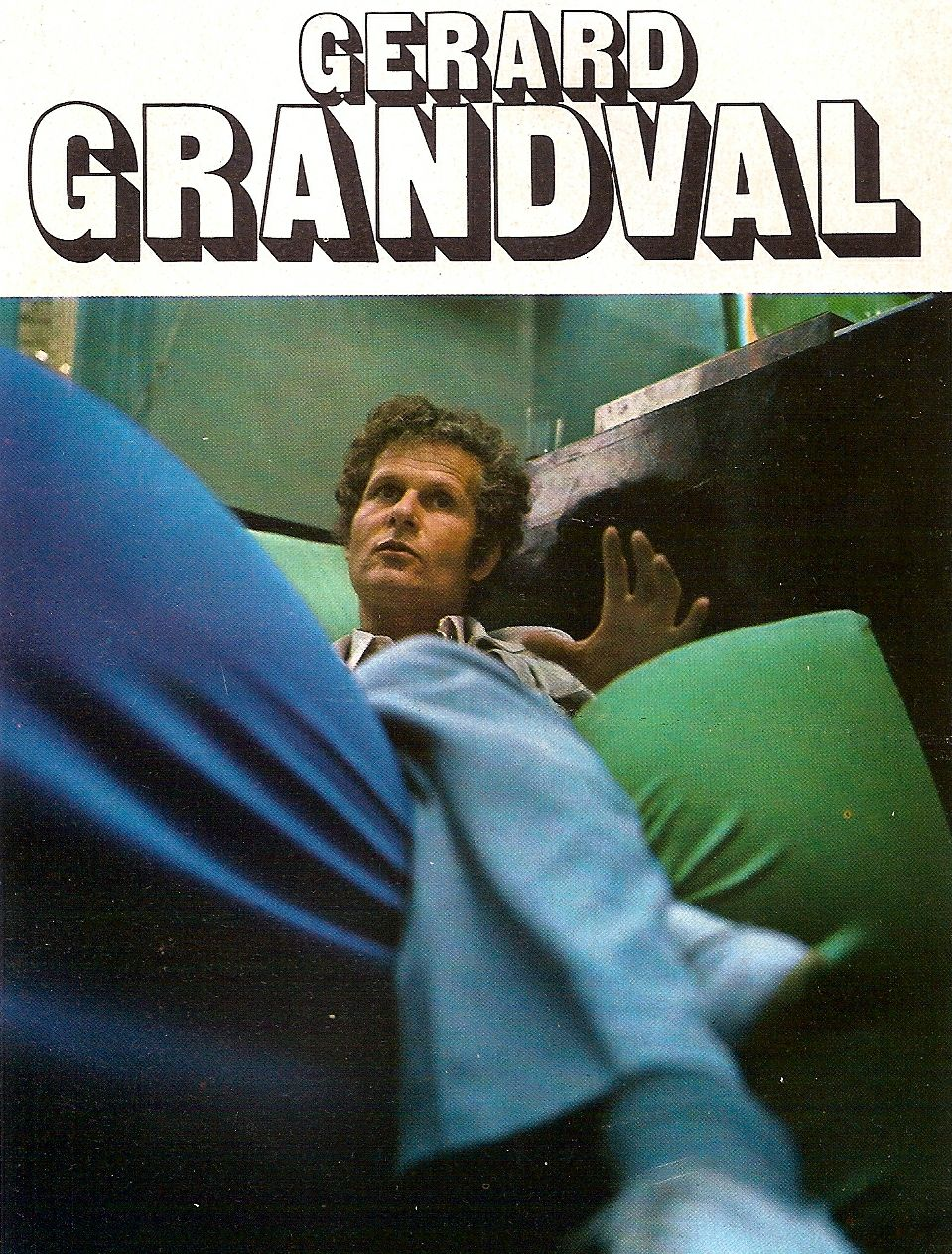
- Grandval in 1975
- Born: 7 October 1930; 16th arrondissement of Paris, France
- Died: 2 December 2021 (aged 91)
- Occupation: Architect

Gérard Grandval (7 October 1930 – 2 December 2021) was a French architect. He received the Prix de Rome and was a Knight of the Ordre des Arts et des Lettres and notably designed the Choux de Créteil.

== Biography ==
Grandval studied at the Lycée Janson-de-Sailly and at the Beaux-Arts de Paris, where he was an apprentice of Emmanuel Pontremoli and André Leconte. He received the Prix Rougevin in 1957 and 1958 and the Prix Edmond-Laberre in 1958.

He began his career as an architect in 1959. He headed the directorate of architecture at the Ministry of Culture from 1967 to 1972 and led an urban planning workshop held in Niort from 1966 to 1970. He worked for a long time in Algeria and also served as a member of the Commission régionale des affaires immobilières et d'architecture de Paris et de la région parisienne. He served as vice-president of the Académie d'architecture from 1999 to 2001. He also headed the jurors' panel for the academy's Prix du Livre d'architecture.

Grandval died on 2 December 2021, at the age of 91.
