= Fateh Moudarres =

Syrian artist (1922–1999)

Fateh Moudarres فاتح المدرس
- Born: Fateh al-Moudarres; 1922; Aleppo, Syria
- Died: 1999 (aged 77); Damascus, Syria
- Education: Accademia di Belle Arti di Roma
- Known for: Painting, Drawing
- Movement: Surrealism

Fateh al-Moudarres (Arabic: فاتح المدرس; 1922–1999) was a Syrian painter and one of the leaders of the modern art movement in Syria. Moudarres studied at the Accademia di Belle Arti in Rome, where he was influenced by Surrealism. After he completed his studies, he returned to Syria where he developed his skills under the auspices of long-time friend, mentor, and tutor Wahbi Al-Hariri.

== Biography ==
Born in Aleppo, Syria, Fateh Moudarres originally taught himself realist painting techniques, before becoming interested in surrealism. He has been considered a master Syrian surrealist painter. After moving back to Syria, he was a lecturer and dean of the faculty of fine arts at Damascus University until 1993, and then became a professor.

== Education ==
=== Accademia di Belle Arti, Rome ===
After receiving his high school degree from the Aleppo American College, Moudarres studied at the Accademia di Belle Arti di Roma in Rome from 1954 to 1960 and developed a distinctive style of painting that incorporated both movements. He abandoned the religious iconography and Syrian art references of his early work for non-objectivity in the 1960s. After 1967 however, his work took on political themes.

=== Ecole nationale supérieure des Beaux Arts, Paris ===
Moudarres also studied at the Ecole des Beaux Arts in Paris for three years in the early 1970s, and honed his technical and compositional skills before returning to Syria to teach at the University of Damascus. This provided him an opportunity to interact with other young Syrian artists. During this time, he was mentored by Syrian artist Wahbi Al-Hariri, "The Last of the Classicists," with whom he would remain friends.

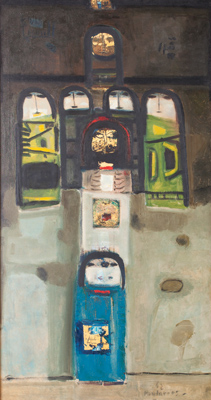
Artwork titled "Icons of Moudarres" by Fateh Moudarres

== Solo exhibitions ==
- 1950 : Club Liwa', Alep
- 1959 : Galleria Cichi, Rome
- 1960 : Hulsser gallery, Munich
- 1961 : Gallery of Modern Art, Damascus
- 1962, 1963 : Gallery One, Beirut
- 1967 : Galerie Contact, Beirut
- 1977 : Galerie Brigitte Shéhadé, Paris; Klagenfurt gallery, Vienna
- 1978, 1981, 1984, 1987, 1989 : Centre culturel français, Damascus
- 1988 : Goethe Institute, Damascus
- 1993 : Aleph Gallery, Washington DC
- 1995 : Institut du monde arabe, Paris
- 2021 : Galerie Roanne de Saint Laurent, Paris "Fateh Moudarres. À mon père, Rania"

== Collections ==
Moudarres was a prolific artist, and several important private collections of his work exist:

- The Al-Hariri Family: Currently the largest private collection of the works of Fateh Moudarres is kept by Mokhless Al-Hariri, son of Syrian artist, Wahbi Al-Hariri of the Al-Hariri Family.
- The Collection of Rudolf and Maria Fechter: Dr. Rudolf Fechter, a German diplomat and statesman, was also a friend of Moudarres and bought several pieces; arguably it was the second major collection of the artist's work before slowly being auctioned recently at Christie's
- Mathaf: Arab Museum of Modern Art, Doha, a collection of modern and contemporary art from North Africa, the Middle East, India, Iran and Diaspora.
- The Collection of Walter Scheel: Scheel, former Minister of Foreign Affairs of the Federal Republic of Germany, and later president, was exposed to Moudarres's work through Dr. Fechter and, an avid collector, acquired several pieces and maintained a small, but sizeable collection.
- Barjeel Art Foundation, Sharjah, UAE.
- Atassi Foundation, Dubai, UAE. Foundation of Atassi Art Gallery in Damascus.

== Posthumous auctions ==
Since his death, prices of his works have been rising. In April 2013 the record price for his work was again raised, maintaining the steady rise his work fetches, when one painting sold for $315,750.00 - well over the $150,000-$200,000 estimate by Christie's. In 2007 average prices of his works were between $10,000 and $20,000. On 30 October 2008, however, at an auction of modern art at the Jumeirah Emirates Towers Hotel in Dubai, one of his paintings, titled Achtar, dated 1983, was initially estimated at $120,000-$160,000 but realized $176,500. At the same auction, a new record was set, but the rarity of the work's size and orientation set it apart: Wedding in The Kalamoon Mountains, Syria fetched $289,000.00.

=== Christie's, Sale 7674 (2008) ===
On October 30, 2008, Christie's auctioned two of Moudarres's paintings. The paintings were the property of private collectors and not part of any collection:

- Achtar (Lot 11), $176,500.00
- The Magician and His Family (Lot 20), $50,000.00

=== Christie's, Sale 7665 (2008) ===
On April 30, 2008, Christie's auctioned several Moudarres pieces, alongside works by Louay Kayyali. One of the latter's paintings realized $157,000.00.

- Kayce and Layla (Lot 1), $11,250.00
- Untitled (Lot 2), $13,750.00
- Family (Lot 3) $43,000.00
- Wedding in The Kalamoon Mountains, Syria (Lot 10) $289,000.00
- Untitled (Lot 24) $193,000.00

=== Christie's, Sale 5539 (2008) ===
On December 17, 2008, Christie's auctioned a small minor work; Untitled realized $10,558.00.

=== Christie's, Sale 7802 (2009) ===
On April 29, 2009, Christie's auctioned off several of Fateh Moudarres's smaller minor works for prices averaging over $50,000. The pieces were part of The Rudolf and Maria Fechter Collection:

- The Icons of Moudarres (Lot 7), $98,500.00
- Untitled (Lot 8), $35,500.00
- Madonna with Dove (Lot 9), $32,500.00
- Untitled, (Lot 10), $18,750.00
- Untitled, (Lot 15), $62,500.00

=== Christie's, Sale 7802 (2009) ===
On April 29, 2009, Christie's auctioned off several of Fateh Moudarres's smaller minor works for prices averaging over $50,000. The pieces were part of The Rudolf and Maria Fechter Collection:

- The Icons of Moudarres (Lot 7), $98,500.00
- Untitled (Lot 8), $35,500.00

=== Christie's, Sale 7804 (2009) ===
On October 27, 2009, Christie's auctioned two of Moudarres's paintings as part of the International Contemporary and Modern Art sale in Dubai

- Landscape (Lot 146), $152,500.00
- Untitled (Lot 31), $122,500.00

=== Christie's, Sale 7895 (2010) ===
On October 26, 2010, Christie's auctioned eight of Moudarres's paintings in the International Modern and Contemporary Art in Dubai, Including Masterpieces from an Italian private collection.

- Untitled (Lot 40), $374,500.00
- Untitled (abstract composition) (Lot 83), $13,750.00
- Untitled (Lot 84), $12,500.00
- Untitled, (Lot 85), $15,000.00
- Untitled, (Lot 86), $3,750.00
- Untitled, (Lot 88), $12,500.00
- Untitled (Mother and child), (Lot 89), $16,250.00
- Family, (Lot 91), $22,500.00

=== Christie's, Sale 5613 (2010) ===
On November 9, 2010, Christie's auctioned eight of Moudarres's paintings in the TABLEAUX ORIENTALISTES ET ART MODERNE ARABE ET IRANIEN in Paris, Including Masterpieces from DE L'ANCIENNE COLLECTION DE MARIA ET SON EXCELLENCE L'AMBASSADEUR RUDOLF FECHTER.

- Choral (God is love) (Lot 104), €20,625.00
- Sheikh de Ras Schamra (Lot 105), €11,250.00
- Three worlds of life (Lot 106), €3,750.00
- L'enfant blond , (Lot 107), €9,375.00
- Easy midnoon in April , (Lot 108), €6,000.00
- Deux figures dans un fond vert , (Lot 109), €7,500.00
- Têtes , (Lot 110), €79,375.00
- La fille au chat , (Lot 111), €10,000.00

=== Christie's, Sale 7933 (2011) ===
On April 19, 2011, Christie's auctioned four of Moudarres's paintings as part of the Modern and Contemporary Arab, Iranian and Turkish Art sale.

- Self-Portrait with Blue Fish (Lot 3), $74,500.00
- The Beast Exit (Lot 5), $188,500.00
- Carnaval (Lot 30), $56,250.00
- Portrait of a Woman , (Lot 31), $56,250.00

=== Christie's, Sale 7935 (2011) ===
On October 25, 2011, Christie's auctioned one of Moudarres's paintings as part of the Modern and Contemporary Arab, Iranian and Turkish Art Part I sale in Dubai

- Nour Al-Ahmar wa Naruhu (Red Light and its Fire) (Lot 9), $170,500.00

=== Christie's, Sale 8058 (2012) ===
On April 18, 2012, Christie's auctioned one of Moudarres's paintings as part of the Modern and Contemporary Arab, Iranian and Turkish Art Part II sale in Dubai

- Women at the Wedding (Lot 106), $80,500.00

=== Christie's, Sale 8061 (2013) ===
On April 16, 2013, Christie's auctioned one of Moudarres's paintings as part of the 2013 Modern and Contemporary Arab, Iranian and Turkish Art Part I sale in Dubai

- Untitled (Lot 10), $315,750.00
