= Miss Syria =

Beauty pageant

- ملكة جمال سوريا
- Formation: 1952
- Type: Beauty pageant
- Headquarters: Aleppo
- Location: Syria
- Members: Miss World; Miss Earth
- Official language: Arabic

Miss Syria (Arabic: ملكة جمال سوريا) is a national beauty pageant in Syria. Beginning one year after the inauguration of Miss World, the competition was halted in the mid-1960s until its re-introduction in the 21st century. The competition has introduced two contestants in Miss World competitions, in 1965 and 1966.

== History ==
Miss Syria began shortly after the inauguration of Miss World in 1951; the competition did not face any opposition from the government of the Second Syrian Republic nor any religious figures. In 1952, Leila Tabriz Tuma, aged 18, won the first version of Miss Syria held in Damascus. However, she did not participate in any international competition due to private reasons which prevented her from travelling abroad. The following year, a Christian woman of Greek descent named Betchamer Minnie won the title.

Syria would be absent from the Miss World competition until 1965, when Raymonde Doucco was the contestant to represent Syria. The following year, a television presenter named Feryelle Jalal was awarded Miss Syria and took part in the 1966 competition. In 1967, Maha Bayrakdar was crowned the title, after which the competition stopped for many years. In an interview from her later years, Bayrakdar stated that she didn't like remembering the competition and felt ashamed about it.

In 2015, model Sarah Nakhla won the competition and represented Syria in that year's edition of Miss Arab World. In 2016, Nilay Noufal won the Miss Syria competition; however, she received criticism from viewers who described her as "ordinary" and undeserving of the title. In 2019, Yasmine al-Hawari won the contest.

In 2020, Syria made its debut in Miss Earth with the entry of model Tia Alkerdi, who won Miss Earth Syria. The country would be placed in the 2021 competition through the entry of Sanaa Atia.

== Syria at International pageants ==
=== Miss World Syria ===
- : Declared as Winner
- : Ended as runner-up or top 5/6 qualification
- : Ended as one of the finalists or semifinalists
- : Ended as special awards winner

| Year | Miss World Syria | Placement at Miss World | Special Awards | Notes |
|---|---|---|---|---|
Did not compete since 1967—present
| 1967 | Maha Bayrakdar | Did not compete | | |
| 1966 | Feryelle Jalal | Unplaced | | |
| 1965 | Raymonde Doucco | Unplaced | | |
Did not compete between 1954—1964
| 1953 | Betchamer Minnie | Did not compete | | |
| 1952 | Leila Teresa Tuma | Did not compete | | |

=== Miss Earth Syria ===
- : Declared as Winner
- : Ended as runner-up or top 5/6 qualification
- : Ended as one of the finalists or semifinalists
- : Ended as special awards winner

| Year | Miss Earth Syria | Placement at Miss Earth | Special Awards | Notes |
|---|---|---|---|---|
Did not compete since 2022—present
| 2021 | Sanaa Atia | Unplaced | | |
| 2020 | Tia Alkerdi | Unplaced | | |
