= Maha Bayrakdar =

Syrian-Lebanese poet and artist (1947–2025)

- Born: Maha Bayrakdar; 26 February 1947; Damascus, Syria
- Died: 22 February 2025 (aged 77)
- Education: Institute of Fine arts of Damascus
- Known for: Poetry and painting
- Spouse: Yusuf al-Khal

Maha Bayrakdar Al-Khal (alternatively: Bayraqdar, Bairakdar, Birqidar, Birdkar, Arabic: مها بيرقدار; 26 February 1947 – 22 February 2025) was a Syrian-Lebanese poet and artist. Bayrakdar sketched and wrote poetry from an early age. She completed fine arts studies in her native Damascus before obtaining a business administration degree at LMU Munich in Germany. In 1967, she won the Miss Syria beauty pageant. In 1970, Bayrakdar married the Syrian-Lebanese poet Yusuf al-Khal and had two children with him: Ward and Youssef, both of whom are acclaimed actors in the Middle East.

Bayrakdar published four poetry collections and was a prolific painter. In addition to poetry, she wrote and illustrated children's books and wrote three television series, all of which feature her children in leading roles.

== Early life and education ==
Maha was born in Damascus on 26 February 1947 to Mohammad Khayr Bayrakdar, a Syrian police officer, and a Lebanese mother, Nazmiyya al‑Amin, a painter. She was the second‑born among her four siblings. She attended the Khadija al‑Kubra school in Damascus before her family began moving during her formative years because of the nature of her father's work. During these moves, Bayrakdar was exposed to the beauty of the Syrian hinterland and began sketching and painting at an early age. Her first venture into poetry came at the age of 14. By the age of 15 she had read all the great works of Russian literature; she was also interested in German literature. Bayrakdar expressed a wish to study theatre, but her father forbade it. Subsequently, she joined the Department of Illustrations at the Institute of Fine Arts in Damascus, where she received her art education and graduated in 1967. She also graduated in business administration from LMU Munich in Germany in 1969.

Bayrakdar won the Miss Syria beauty pageant in 1967, an experience she avoided discussing.

== Courtship and marriage ==
Bayrakdar went to Lebanon to print a poetry book at the An‑Nahar publishing press. At the An‑Nahar offices, she met her future husband, Yusuf al‑Khal, who was 31 years her senior. Al‑Khal was a poet, a writer, and an art critic who was responsible for the cultural section of the An‑Nahar newspaper. Bayrakdar was instantly infatuated with him but was annoyed when Yusuf treated her with reserve and harshly criticised her work. Bayrakdar challenged al‑Khal to read her poetry, which led him to meet her again and to express his fondness for her.

In 1970, Bayrakdar married al‑Khal. The couple had two children: Youssef (born on 8 September 1973) and Ward, both of whom are renowned actors. Bayrakdar, who was born and raised a Sunni Muslim, converted to Christianity. Although Yusuf was a Protestant, the Khals baptised both of their children into the Maronite Catholic Church.

== Career ==
Bayrakdar's first poetry compilation, which she submitted to An‑Nahar, was not published. She later published a number of poetry books: ʿeshbat al‑Meleh (The Salt Herb, 1989), Rahil al‑ʿanaser (The Departure of the Elements, 1995), as‑Samt (The Silence, 2004), and Dawat ar‑ruh (The Cure of the Soul, 2011). She wrote and illustrated children's books and wrote song lyrics. Bayrakdar and Yusuf al‑Khal curated the Beiruti art gallery Gallery One between 1970 and 1975.

Bayrakdar worked at National Syrian Radio and Television and at local Lebanese radio stations as a producer and presenter of cultural programmes. Between 1980 and 1987, she edited and illustrated the Dar Assayad publishing house magazine Fairuz. She was editor‑in‑chief of the arts and interior design magazine Iwan, and also editor‑in‑chief of the intellectual, cultural, and artistic magazine Al‑Jidar. In 2008, Bayrakdar wrote the television drama series Al‑ta'er al‑maksour (The Broken Bird), in which both her children have leading roles; the series garnered praise, with a rating of 4.3/5 by elCinema website critics. In 2010 and 2013, respectively, she wrote Noktet Hobb (A Drop of Love) and Kharej Az‑Zaman (Beyond Time), which featured both Ward and Youssef in leading roles.

== Views ==
Bayrakdar did not ascribe to feminist literature and refused to put any labels on literary works. She criticised Lebanese drama shows for their monotony and lack of creative diversity.

== Exhibitions ==
Bayrakdar held 15 solo exhibitions, 37 collective exhibitions, and numerous poetry reading events in Lebanon, Syria, Iraq, and the Arabian Gulf countries. Only four of her exhibitions were held in her native Syria, the last of which took place before the beginning of the Syrian civil war in 2011.

== Death ==
Bayrakdar died on 22 February 2025, at the age of 77.

== Awards and recognition ==
On 11 June 2004, Bayrakdar was decorated with the Order of Merit medal by the Lebanese president, Emile Lahoud. She was also awarded a recognition plaque from the Lebanese Army command.
