= Massier =

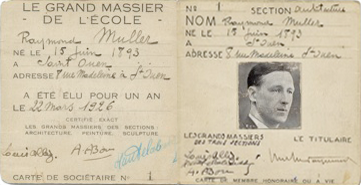
Membership card of Raymond Müller (1893-1982), studio student in the Architecture Paulin-André aux Beaux-Arts de Paris. He was the first elected president or 'Grand Massier' of the Grande Masse des Beaux-Arts association.

In French art and architecture schools, a massier or massière is a student elected by their fellow students to represent them and to take on tasks such as acting as treasurer of the studio's communal finances. The job is named after the 'masse' or sum of money held in common for the necessary expenses in the groups' life and each one's apprenticeship, though the word could also by extension mean the student office which managed the money, headed by a 'massier'.

== Etymology ==
The term originated during the 1871 Paris Commune, when the students of the Beaux-Arts de Paris used "Faisons masse!" as their battle-cry, but it also existed long before the Commune. 'Massier' is also the French word for a ceremonial mace-bearer, a soldier armed with a mace, an 'apparitor', a 'huissier' or an officer who bore a mace symbolic of his role.

== History ==
The role massier existed in art schools from their creation onwards, due to students' need to club together to buy drawing, painting and sculpting tools, paper, canvases etc. on better terms and to pay models. When the Beaux-Arts de Paris was split into schools of art and architecture in 1968, the massiers' roles were also split and so, for example, the painting students entering in large numbers from 1968 onwards and from quantitatively very modest class backgrounds had their painting materials and models paid for by the school itself.

The organisation long remained quite informal, until the creation of the Grande Masse des Beaux-Arts in 1926 under the 1901 association law which establishes an organisation and precise hierarchies. Each class or studio elected a massier, the massiers in turn elected a 'grand massier' (large massier) for each category officially taught (painting, sculpture, architecture, engraving), and ultimately the president of the association was entitled Grand Messier, supervising and coordinating the overall organisation. The architecture schools became independent from the schools of fine art in 1968 but retained the principal of massiers, until the architecture section provided the majority of 'grands massiers', including the architects and urbanists Jean Maneval (1925-1986), Michel Holley (1924) and Claude Guislain (1929-2011), etc.

The first grand massier to be elected was the association's founder Raymond Muller (1893-1982). The first woman to hold the role and not to be from the architecture section was Béatrice Chagnon, born in 1957, elected in 1983.

Massiers continued to exist in private studios and many less important art schools.

== Some massiers of the École nationale supérieure des beaux-arts ==
-Painting:

- Maurice Boitel, on his return from war, made massier of the studio of Eugène Narbonne (1944-1946)
- Michel-Henry and Michel Four, massiers to Roger Chapelain-Midy
- Nathan Bertet, massier to the Rielly studio, relieving Christine Safa

== Literature ==
The 'massier' was often cited in works on the lives of 19th and 20th century French art students, in need of both finding money and using it usefully and pleasurably.
