= Louay Kayali =

Syrian artist (1934-1978)

Louay Kayali لؤي كيالي
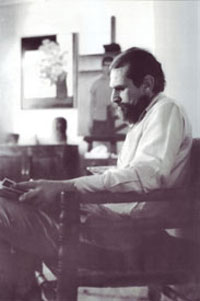
- Born: January 20, 1934; Aleppo, Syria
- Died: January 26, 1978 (aged 44); Aleppo, Syria
- Education: Accademia di Belle Arti di Roma
- Known for: Painting, Drawing
- Movement: Modern

Louay Kayali (Arabic: لؤي كيالي), (20 January 1934 – 26 January 1978) was a Syrian modern artist.

== Biography ==
Kayali was born in Aleppo, Syria in 1934 and studied art in the Accademia di Belle Arti after having studied at the Al-Tajhiz School where his work was first exhibited in 1952. He met Syrian artist Wahbi al-Hariri there and the two would share a friendship for the rest of Kayali's life. Al-Hariri would become his mentor as he was for artist Fateh Moudarres that Hariri introduced to Kayali in 1955. Moudarress and Kayali would together represent Syrian modern art at the Venice Biennial Fair. He suffered from depression and died in 1978 from burns incurred from his bed catching fire, reportedly from a cigarette.

=== Return to Syria ===
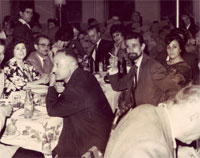
Wahbi al-Hariri, front center, and Kayali, right, facing; Aleppo, 1964.

He graduated from the Academy of Fine Arts in Rome in 1961 and returned to Syria where he started his career as a fine arts professor at Damascus University where Fateh Moudarres also taught. That same year, the International Modern Art Hall of Damascus hosted his exhibit of 28 oil paintings on canvas and 30 sketches.

=== Posthumous exchanges ===
In 2009, Bonham's Auction House sold one of Kayali's paintings for $132,000.

In 2008, Christie's auctioned off several of his paintings:

- Portrait of a Lady, $34,600
- Motherhood, $157,000
- The Laundrette, $43,000

On April 16, 2013, Christie's sold two of his paintings as part of the Modern and Contemporary Arab, Iranian and Turkish Art Part I auction (Sale 8061) in Dubai

- Boy Reading, (Lot 7), $135,750
- Big Boy with Watering Can, (Lot 9), $159,750

On October 25, 2011, Christie's Dubai sold his work titled "Fisherman in Arwad" for $194,500 which is the highest auction sale price as of March 16, 2016

== Tribute ==
In 2019, he was featured as a Google Doodle on what would have been his 85th birthday.

== See also ==
- Wahbi al-Hariri
- Fateh Moudarres
