= Helen Khal =

American-Lebanese painter (1923–2009)

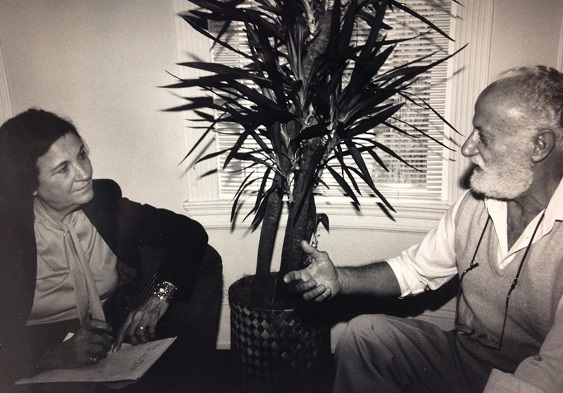
- Helen Khal with artist Wahbi al-Hariri-Rifai, Washington, D.C., 1984.
- Born: Feb 9, 1923; Allentown, Pennsylvania
- Died: 2009 (aged 85–86); Ajaltoun, Lebanon
- Known for: Painting
- Spouse: Yusuf al-Khal

Helen Khal (1923 – 2009) was an American artist and critic of Lebanese descent.

== Early life ==
Helen Khal was born on February 9, 1923, in Allentown, Pennsylvania to a Lebanese American family from Tripoli, Lebanon. She was the daughter of Thomas Joseph and Salma Sassine Chaiboub. She started her painting career at the age of 21; when illness forced house rest, she began to draw. On a visit to Lebanon in 1946, she met and married the young Syrian-Lebanese poet Yusuf al-Khal (they later divorced), and remained in the country to study art at ALBA from 1946 to 1948. She returned to the United States briefly but in 1973, after moving back to Lebanon, she established Lebanon's first permanent art gallery, Gallery One.

=== Career ===
With the encouragement of her colleagues, notably well-known Lebanese artist Aref Rayess, Khal pursued her art and she held her first individual exhibition in 1960 in Galerie Alecco Saab in Beirut. Her other one-woman shows took place at Galerie Trois Feuilles d'Or, Beirut (1965); Galerie Manoug, Beirut (1968); at the First National Bank, Allentown, Pennsylvania (1969); in Kaslik, Lebanon (1970); at the Contact Art Gallery, Beirut (1972, 1974 and 1975) and at the Bolivar Gallery in Kingston, Jamaica in 1975. Her work also appeared in the Biennales of Alexandria and São Paulo.

During the 1960s, Khal moved increasingly from portraiture and still life towards abstraction. She became particularly associated with atmospheric fields of colour. In the 1968 painting Untitled (Ochre over Brown), broad blocks of colour form a hazy, horizon-like space, an approach that has been compared with color field painting.

She also taught art at the American University of Beirut from 1967 to 1976 and at the Lebanese American University from 1997 to 1980. She inspired many other artists and her "background concerning art is fully enriched by the many wonders of the world of art."

Helen Khal was also recognized as an author and critic. "From 1966 to 1974, Helen Khal was Art Critic to two Lebanese periodicals, The Daily Star and Monday Morning. She also wrote a number of publications in the Middle East and the USA and frequently lectured on art."

A series of 22 lectures that she gave was collected and published as a book titled The Woman Artist in Lebanon.

=== Death ===
Khal died in 2009.

=== Legacy ===
Khal's work was included in the 1994 exhibition Forces of Change at the National Museum of Women in the Arts. Her work was included in the 2021 exhibition Women in Abstraction at the Centre Pompidou. In 2023 her work was included in the exhibition Action, Gesture, Paint: Women Artists and Global Abstraction 1940-1970 at the Whitechapel Gallery in London. Also in 2023, a book her, Helen Khal: Gallery One and Beirut in the 1960s, was published.
