= Aleppo College =

Coordinates: 36°11′59″N 37°07′33″E

Aleppo American College
- كلية حلب الأمريكية / معهد حلب العلمي

Location
- Taha Hussein Street; Aleppo; Syria

Information
- Type: Private school
- Established: 1876 (in Aintab) relocated to Aleppo in 1923
- Founder: American Board of Commissioners and Foreign Missions (ABCFM)
- President: Najib Bitar
- Principal: Reverend Ibrahim Nseir
- Grades: 1 - 12
- Athletics: football, basketball, tennis, athletics, swimming
- Affiliations: Union of the Armenian Evangelical Churches in the Near East, The National Evangelical Synod of Syria and Lebanon
- Languages: English, Arabic, French

Aleppo College (Arabic: كلية حلب الأمريكية / معهد حلب العلمي; also called American Aleppo College) is a junior college. It awards school leaving certificates at the age of 16. Until 1964, it taught first and second-year classes in the arts, engineering and medicine to students aged 16-18. It is based in the Syrian city of Aleppo since 1923. The roots of the college can be traced back to the Central Turkey College of Aintab, founded between 1874 and 1876 by the American Board of Commissioners and Foreign Missions in the Ottoman Empire to serve the sizeable Christian Armenian population in the region.

== History ==
The students of the Aintab College were largely Armenians - mainly Protestant Armenians - but non-Armenians also attended. As a result of the massacres of the Armenians during the 1915 Armenian genocide, the college was transferred to the Syrian city of Aleppo through the efforts of its director John E. Merrill (1898–1937) where it became known as Aleppo College or the Aleppo American College and functioned as a high school.

== School facilities ==
By 1930, with the efforts of the American benefactor James Lack, a large piece of land of 13 hectares was donated to erect the new buildings of the school in the south-western suburbs of Aleppo. However, the construction process was only launched in 1936 and completed in 1939. Due to the circumstances of the Second World War, the construction of the second building, named the American High School for Girls, started only in 1950 and was completed in 1952.

== Legacy ==
In its life of more than 150 years the college has helped prepare thousands of young men and women for service to society. In the secular field its graduates have distinguished themselves as teachers, school administrators, nurses, physicians, surgeons, pharmacists, dentists, writers, merchants, engineers, government officials and a cross-section of the occupations of its alumni.

== Alumni ==
Alumni of Aleppo College include:

- Nazim al-Kudsi, former president of Syria
- Fateh Moudarres, Syrian painter
- Moustapha Akkad, film producer and director
- Muhamad Aly Rifai, Syrian American Physician
