= Choux de Créteil =

Group of buildings in Paris, France

Coordinates: 48.78615°N 2.445563°E

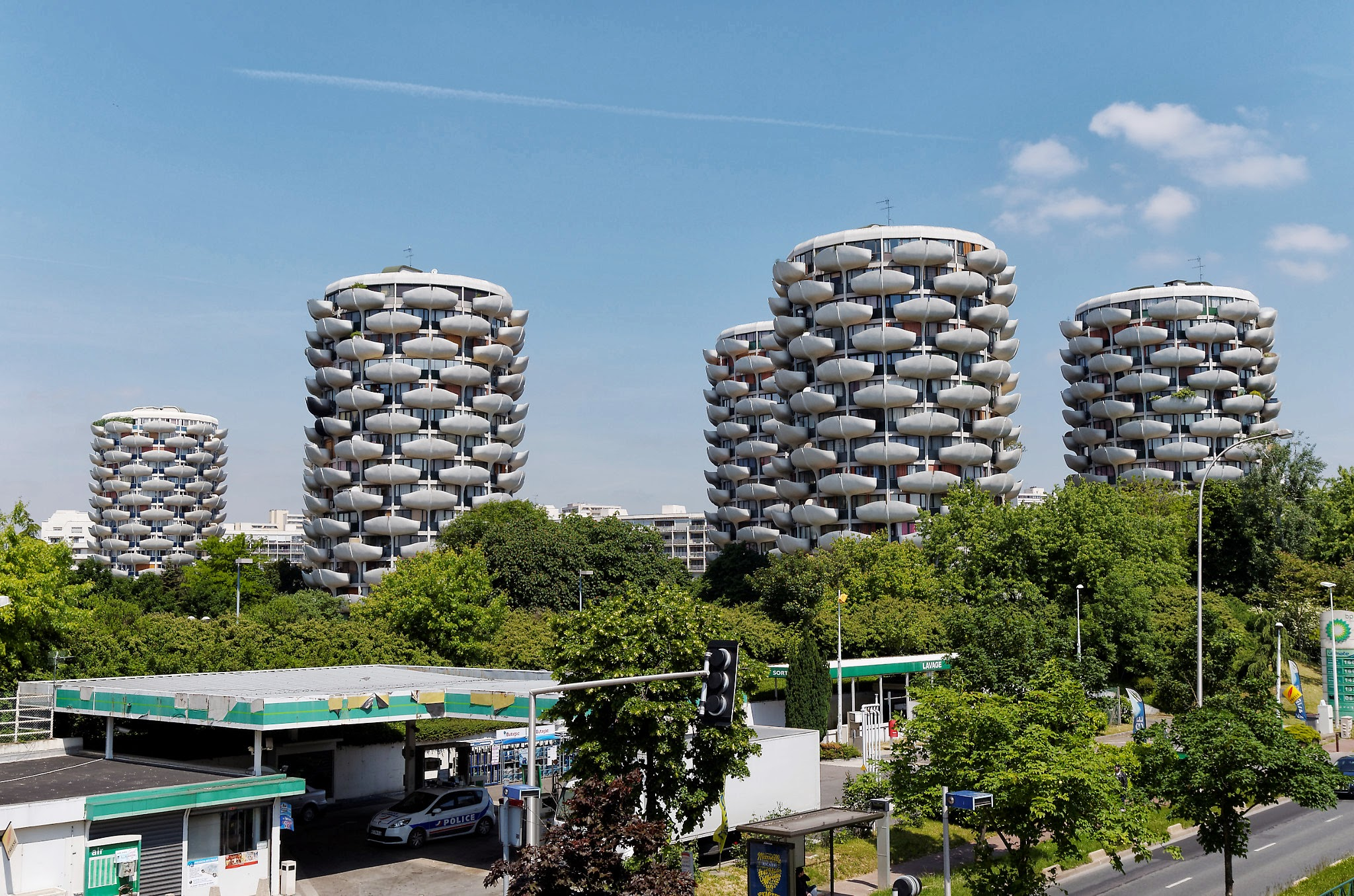
Five of the buildings

Les Choux de Créteil is a group of ten cylindrical buildings, each 15 stories in height, in the Paris suburb of Créteil. The project is known as Les Choux (the cabbages), due to the unusual shape of their balconies. The buildings were designed by architect Gérard Grandval, and were completed in 1974.

The project was recognized as a "Heritage of the 20th Century" by the French Ministry of Culture (16 December 2008); at the time the work was regarded as a symbol of 1970s French architecture.

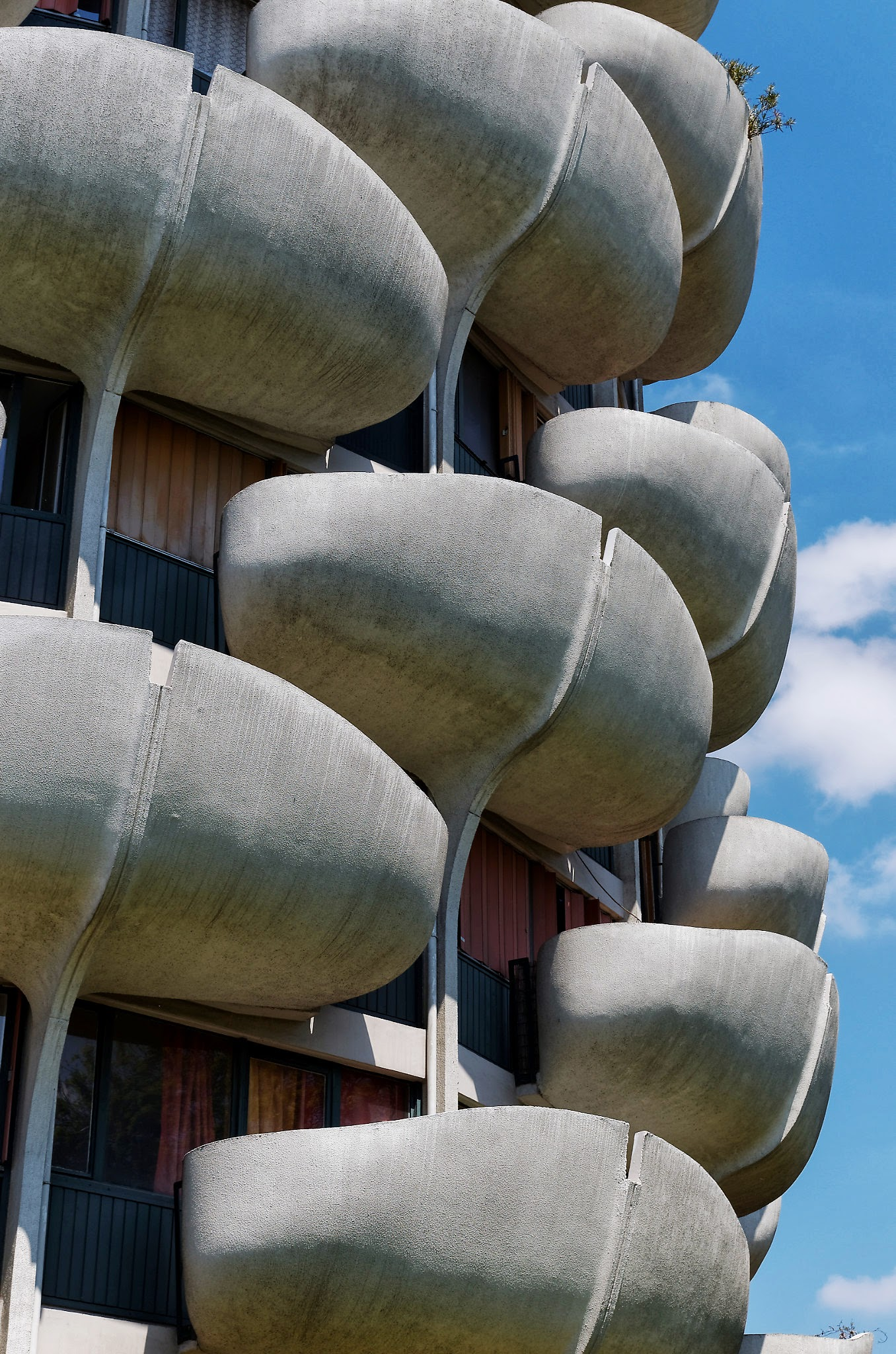
Close-up of the balconies

The buildings' unique shape is intended to be functional; the apartments' living spaces are closer to the windows, and the 2-meter-tall balconies provide outdoor access and privacy at the same time. The curved balconies were intended to be planted with all sorts of ornamental plants and small trees, thus causing the aspect of the buildings to change according to seasons, but that part of the project was never carried out.

The project was initiated in 1966, in an area which had been used for a century to produce much of the vegetables for Parisian tables. This fact was undoubtedly on the architect's mind as he envisioned his structures.

In 1998 the municipality opted to upgrade the area. The central sprout, largely dedicated to families of precarious means, was rebuilt. To encourage social intermixing, the leaders dedicated a fourth of the apartments to students.

== Popular culture ==
Les Choux de Créteil played an integral role in the 2009 French film Tellement proches (So Close).

== See also ==
- List of Brutalist structures

== Bibliography ==
- Alexis Vibert-Guigue, Au temps des chemins de grue - Chronique des années de béton, 1953-1993 (Paris 1993). Chapter: Un pavé dans la marre : Les choux de Créteil; pp. 147–156
