= Aziz Hadeed =

Antiguan businessman, politician and philanthropist (died 2026)

Sir Aziz Hadeed KCMG CBE
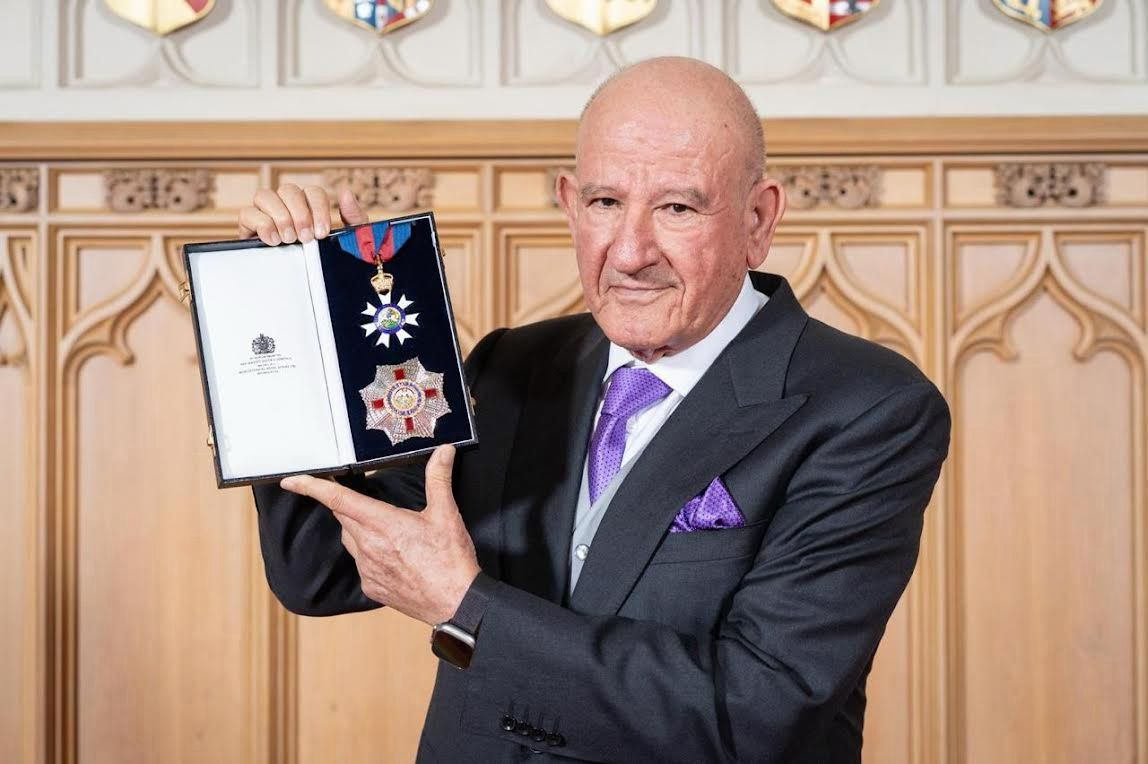
- A formal portrait taken at Windsor Castle following his KCMG investiture ceremony

Member of the Senate of Antigua and Barbuda
- In office 23 March 2004 – 9 February 2009

Government Senator
- In office 23 March 2004 – 9 February 2009

Minister without Portfolio
- In office 5 January 2005 – 31 December 2006

Minister of State within the Office of the Prime Minister
- In office 26 March 2004 – 4 January 2005

Independent Senator
- In office 1994–2004

Personal details
- Born: Aziz Fares Hadeed Amar al-Hosn, Syria
- Died: 23 May 2026 Chicago, Illinois, U.S.
- Citizenship: Antigua and Barbuda
- Spouse(s): Dr. Mahasen, Lady Hadeed
- Education: St. Joseph's Academy
- Occupation: Business executive, politician, philanthropist

Sir Aziz Fares Hadeed KCMG CBE (died 23 May 2026) was an Antiguan business executive, politician, diplomat and philanthropist. He served as the Executive Chairman of the Hadeed Group of Companies, one of the largest corporate conglomerates in the Eastern Caribbean. Beyond his commercial ventures, Hadeed had a distinguished career in public service, serving as an Independent Senator, a Cabinet Minister under the United Progressive Party administration, and Dean of the Diplomatic Corps.

In his later years, Hadeed became a central figure in regional higher education, serving as the inaugural Chairman of the University of the West Indies (UWI) Five Islands Campus Council from its inception in 2019 until his death. Recognized for his monumental contributions to national infrastructure, education, and community welfare, he was appointed a Commander of the Order of the British Empire (CBE) in 2016 and was knighted as a Knight Commander of the Order of St. Michael and St. George (KCMG) in 2025.

== Early life and education ==
Aziz Fares Hadeed was born to Fares and Ramza Hadeed in Amar al-Hosn, Syria. His father immigrated to the Caribbean in 1952, eventually establishing roots for the family. Hadeed arrived in Antigua in the early 1960s as a teenager and enrolled at St. Joseph's Academy in St. John's. Despite facing early language barriers, he demonstrated an exceptional aptitude for mathematics.

Upon completing his secondary education, Hadeed joined the family business in 1965. While working, he concurrently pursued specialized training and correspondence courses in accounting and corporate business administration to develop his commercial acumen.

== Business career ==
=== Hadeed Group of Companies ===
Hadeed is widely regarded as one of the chief architects of the Hadeed Group of Companies. Alongside his older brother, the late Sir Ramez Hadeed, he transformed the family enterprise, F.E. Hadeed and Sons, into a multi-million-dollar multi-sector conglomerate. In 1980, Hadeed ascended to the position of Executive Chairman of the Hadeed Group. Under his corporate stewardship, the company expanded operations internationally across the Americas and the Caribbean, establishing business interests in Trinidad and Tobago, Barbados, Jamaica, Guyana, and the United States.

He led the market expansion of Hadeed Motors Ltd., growing it into the premier motor vehicle dealership in Antigua and Barbuda, securing authorized dealerships for brands including Nissan, Suzuki, BMW, and MG Motors. He was also instrumental in the acquisition of Antigua Masonry Products (AMP), turning it into a primary operational asset during the country's construction developments.

=== Energy and aviation ===
In 1996, Hadeed negotiated a landmark power-purchasing agreement with the government through the Antigua Public Utilities Authority (APUA), creating the Antigua Power Company Ltd. (APCL). From an initial output of 15 megawatts in 1997, APCL expanded under his leadership to generate roughly 70 megawatts of power, supplying approximately 90 percent of the electrical energy utilized in Antigua and Barbuda. In his final years, Hadeed steered the company toward green transition initiatives, forming a joint-venture hybrid diesel-LNG facility at Crabbes with U.S.-based Eagle LNG to reduce the country's carbon footprint.

Hadeed also contributed significantly to regional aviation logistics, serving as the Chairman of the Board of directors for the regional carrier LIAT (1974) Limited from 1995 to 1998.

== Political and public career ==
Hadeed maintained a lengthy career in public policy and national development. In 1994, Prime Minister Lester Bird appointed him as an Independent Senator to the Senate of Antigua and Barbuda, where he served for two consecutive terms.

In March 2004, Hadeed was appointed a Government Senator under the United Progressive Party (UPP) administration led by Prime Minister Baldwin Spencer. From 2004 to 2006, he served as a member of the Cabinet, holding the portfolios of Minister of State within the Office of the Prime Minister from 26 March 2004 to 4 January 2005, and subsequently Minister without Portfolio from 5 January 2005 to 31 December 2006. He later transitioned to serve as an ambassador with ministerial rank from 1 January 2007 to 15 March 2009, leveraging his private-sector experience to guide national economic policies. He also served the state as the Dean of the Diplomatic Corps.

== Academic leadership and UWI Five Islands ==
In August 2019, the University of the West Indies appointed Hadeed as the inaugural Chairman of the Campus Council for the newly founded Five Islands Campus (UWI FIC) in Antigua and Barbuda. He was reappointed to a second five-year term in 2024.

During his tenure, Hadeed oversaw the expansion of the campus from an inaugural cohort of 173 students to more than 1,400 students by 2026. According to Professor C. Justin Robinson, Pro Vice-Chancellor and Campus Principal, Hadeed's leadership was "rooted in a genuine belief that access to higher education is the foundation upon which a just and thriving society is built."

=== Infrastructure and expansion ===
In 2023, Hadeed played a pivotal role in securing a historic US$80 million loan agreement from the Saudi Fund for Development to fund a massive physical expansion of the campus. The development strategy included new state-of-the-art classrooms, sports complexes, and dormitories equipped to house 500 regional students from the wider Organisation of Eastern Caribbean States (OECS). Furthermore, Hadeed championed modern curriculum adaptations, integrating specialized programs in Artificial Intelligence, Climate Change, and the Blue Economy.

== Philanthropy and community work ==
Hadeed's philanthropic footprint spanned regional education, healthcare, sports, and cultural arts, with much of his work funded privately.

- Educational Scholarships: He personally donated over EC$1.2 million to support the initial startup costs of UWI FIC and established a continuous scholarship fund, expanding his personal sponsorship to cover 24 students annually by 2025 to ensure tertiary education access for low-income students.
- Maritime and Sports: Hadeed was the primary financial benefactor for the "Team Antigua Island Girls" rowing team, donating EC$400,000 to facilitate their participation in the 2018 Atlantic Rowing Challenge and providing follow-up funding for the 2023 World's Toughest Row Pacific Challenge.
- Arts and Culture: He donated a substantial parcel of land to the Antigua and Barbuda Youth Symphony Orchestra (ABYSO) for the future construction of their permanent musical and operational headquarters.
- Social Welfare & COVID-19: During the COVID-19 pandemic, Hadeed designed and funded widespread food assistance initiatives and utility subsidies to cushion economically vulnerable households.

== Personal life and death ==
Hadeed was married to medical practitioner Dr. Mahasen, Lady Hadeed. He maintained close multigenerational ties with several prominent national figures, including Governor-General Sir Rodney Williams.

On 23 May 2026, Hadeed died suddenly while visiting Chicago, Illinois, in the United States. Following his death, the Cabinet of Antigua and Barbuda ordered that he be accorded an official funeral in recognition of his lifetime of national service, corporate leadership and patriotism.

== Honours and awards ==
- 1995: Named "Master of the Year for Barbados and the Eastern Caribbean" by the Ernst & Young Awards Scheme.
- 2016: Appointed a Commander of the Most Excellent Order of the British Empire (CBE) by Queen Elizabeth II for services to business and community development.
- 2025: Appointed an Ordinary Knight Commander of the Civil Division of the Most Distinguished Order of St Michael and St George (KCMG) by King Charles III. He was invested by Prince William at Windsor Castle for his services to philanthropy, education, and economic development.
