= Islamic Arts Museum Malaysia =

Museum in Kuala Lumpur, Malaysia

- Muzium Kesenian Islam Malaysia
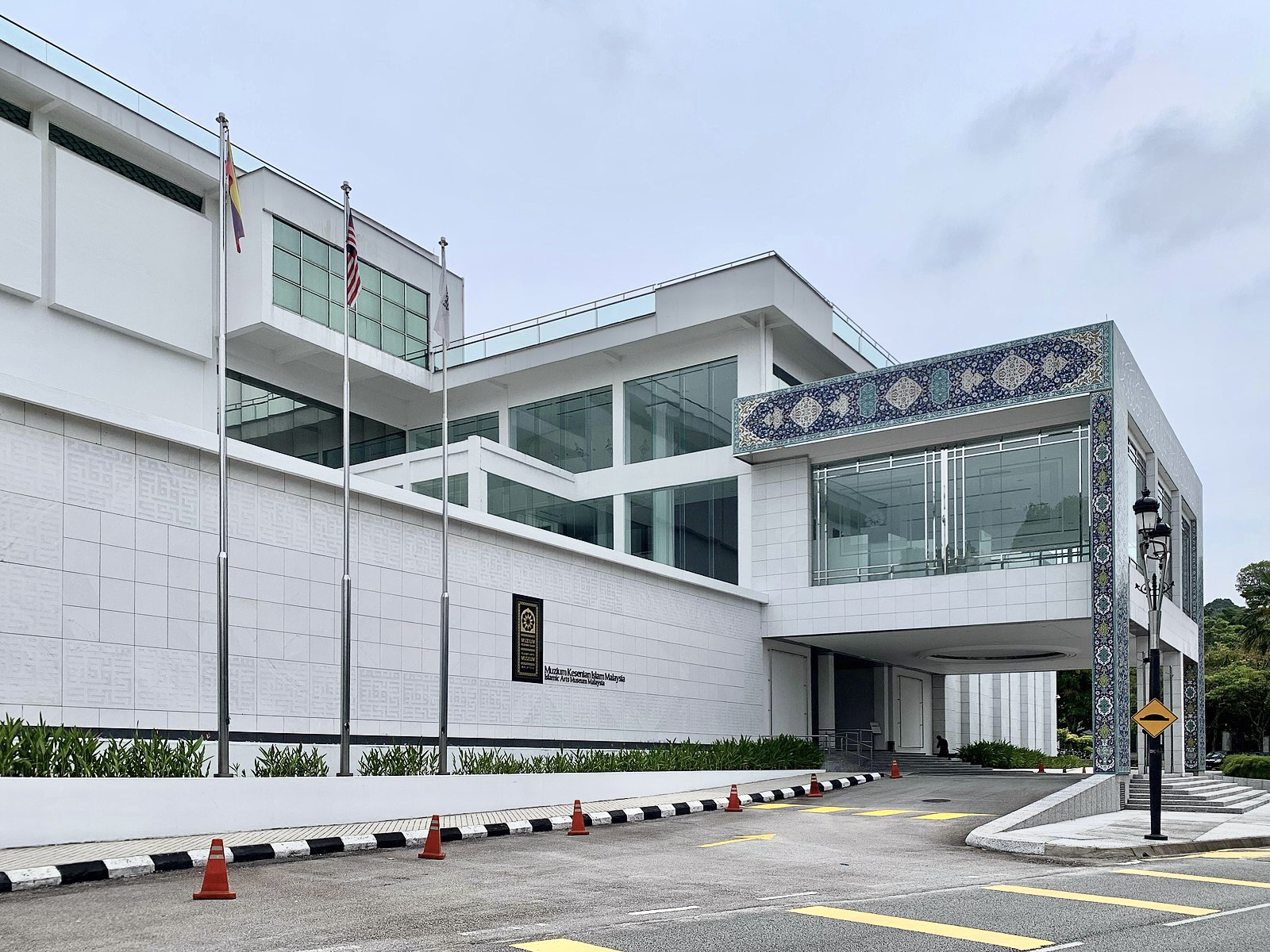
- Exterior of the museum in 2022

- Location within Kuala Lumpur
- Established: 1998
- Location: Jalan Lembah Perdana, Kuala Lumpur, Malaysia
- Coordinates: 3.1419°N 101.6898°E
- Type: Museum
- Director: Syed Mohamad Albukhary
- Public transit access: Kuala Lumpur Railway Station (KTM Komuter)
- Website: www.iamm.org.my

The Islamic Arts Museum Malaysia (Malay: Muzium Kesenian Islam Malaysia) is a museum in Kuala Lumpur, Malaysia. It was officially opened on 12 December 1998. The museum is the largest museum of Islamic arts in Southeast Asia with more than seven thousands artifacts from the Islamic world.

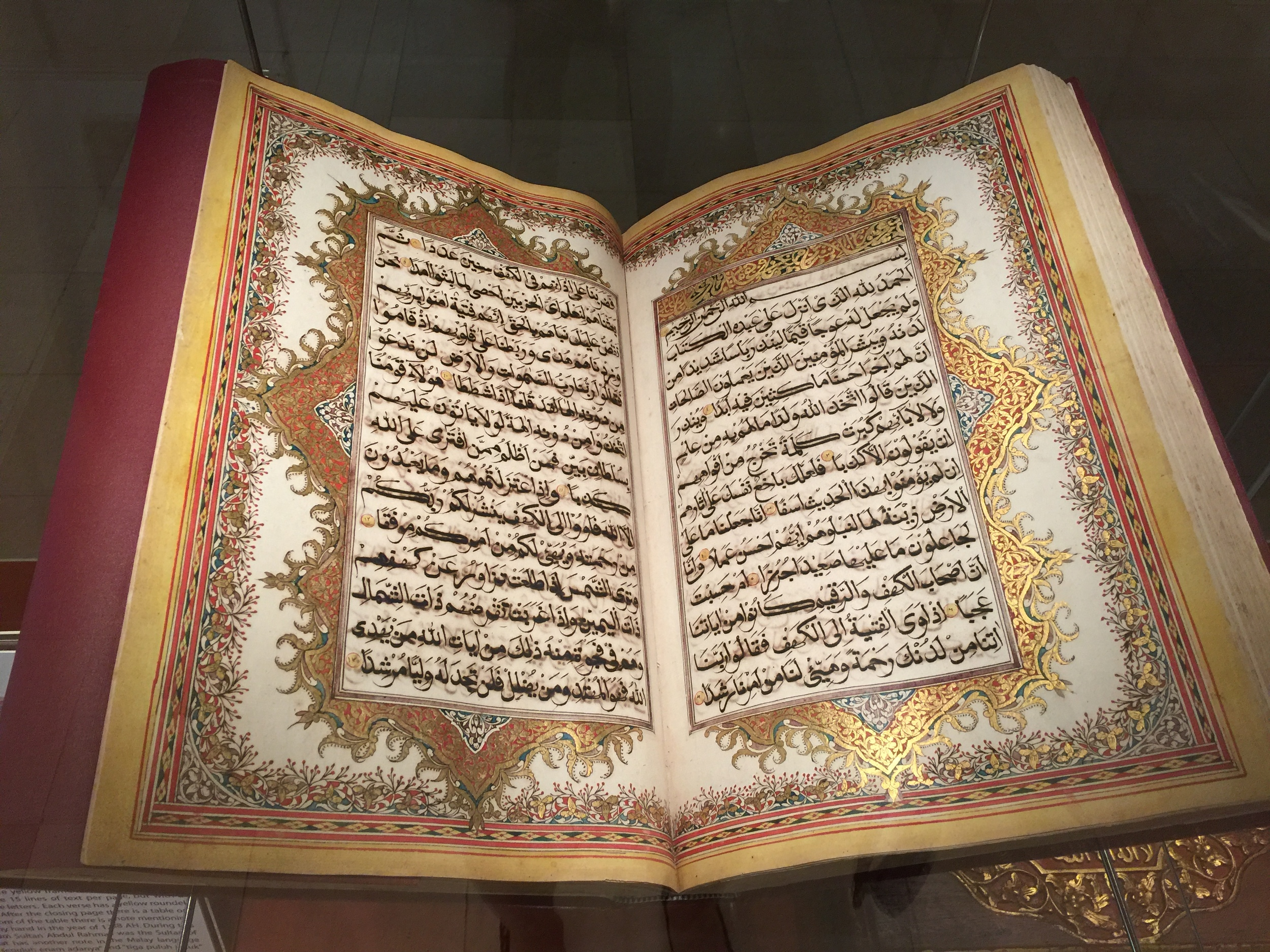
Central illumination of the Royal Terengganu Quran dated 1871

== Exhibits ==
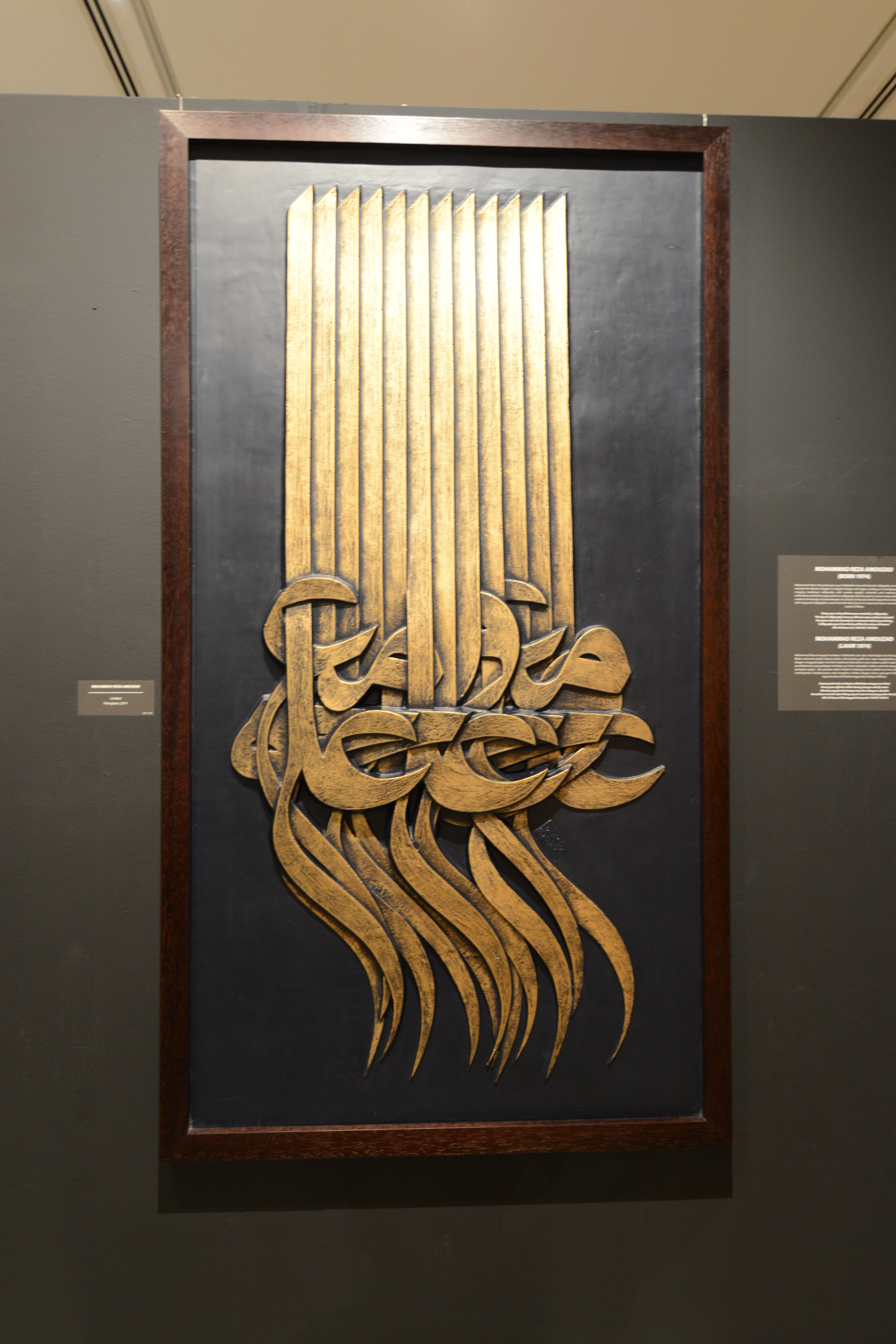
Art using calligraphy at the Islamic Arts Museum Malaysia

The museum consists of twelve gallery spaces, spread over two levels. Level one contains galleries devoted to Architecture, Qur’an and other Manuscripts, and one each for the art of India, China and the Malay Peninsula. Level two houses galleries devoted to Arms & Armor, Textiles, Jewelry and Coins, with the remaining three galleries consisting of art works categorized by their materials – Metal, Wood and Ceramics. The museum is also known for their collection of ancient Islamic glassware.

The museum also houses educational, research, and extensive conservation facilities. One of the most famous permanent exhibitions is a faithfully restored and complete early-nineteenth century "Ottoman Room" dating back to the 19th century. Conservators used data born out of the restoration of this room to collaborate frequently with international colleagues, add to the wider conversation about conserving Islamic vernacular architecture, and to draw attention to the effects on “painted woods in tropical climates such as Southeast Asia.”

== Architecture ==
The exterior of the 30,000 sq. meter building is defined by clean lines and 21st century construction techniques, yet includes some traditional Islamic architectural details that activate the surface. Such details include the ornate, turquoise-colored tiled domes that recall a textile aesthetic and have established the building as an iconic landmark on the Kuala Lumpur skyline. Likewise, an entrance reminiscent of an iwan, embellished by Iranian tile workers, continues the tapestry aesthetic.

== Awards and recognition ==
Awards and Recognition
Year	Awards/Recognition	Organization
2014	Platinum Award-Tourist Attraction (Culture, Arts and Heritage) Category	Kuala Lumpur Mayor's Tourism Award
2014	Top 10 Travellers’ Choice Museums (10th in Asia)	TripAdvisor
2015	Top 10 Travellers’ Choice Museums (10th in Asia)	TripAdvisor

== Transportation ==
The museum is accessible within walking distance west of Kuala Lumpur railway station.

== See also ==
- List of Islamic art museums
- List of museums in Malaysia

== Literature ==
- Curatorial Department (2002). Islamic Arts Museum Malaysia. Kuala Lumpur: Islamic Arts Museum Malaysia. pp. 280 pages. ISBN 978-9834084509.
- Lenzi, Iola (2004). Museums of Southeast Asia. Singapore: Archipelago Press. p. 200. ISBN 981-4068-96-9.

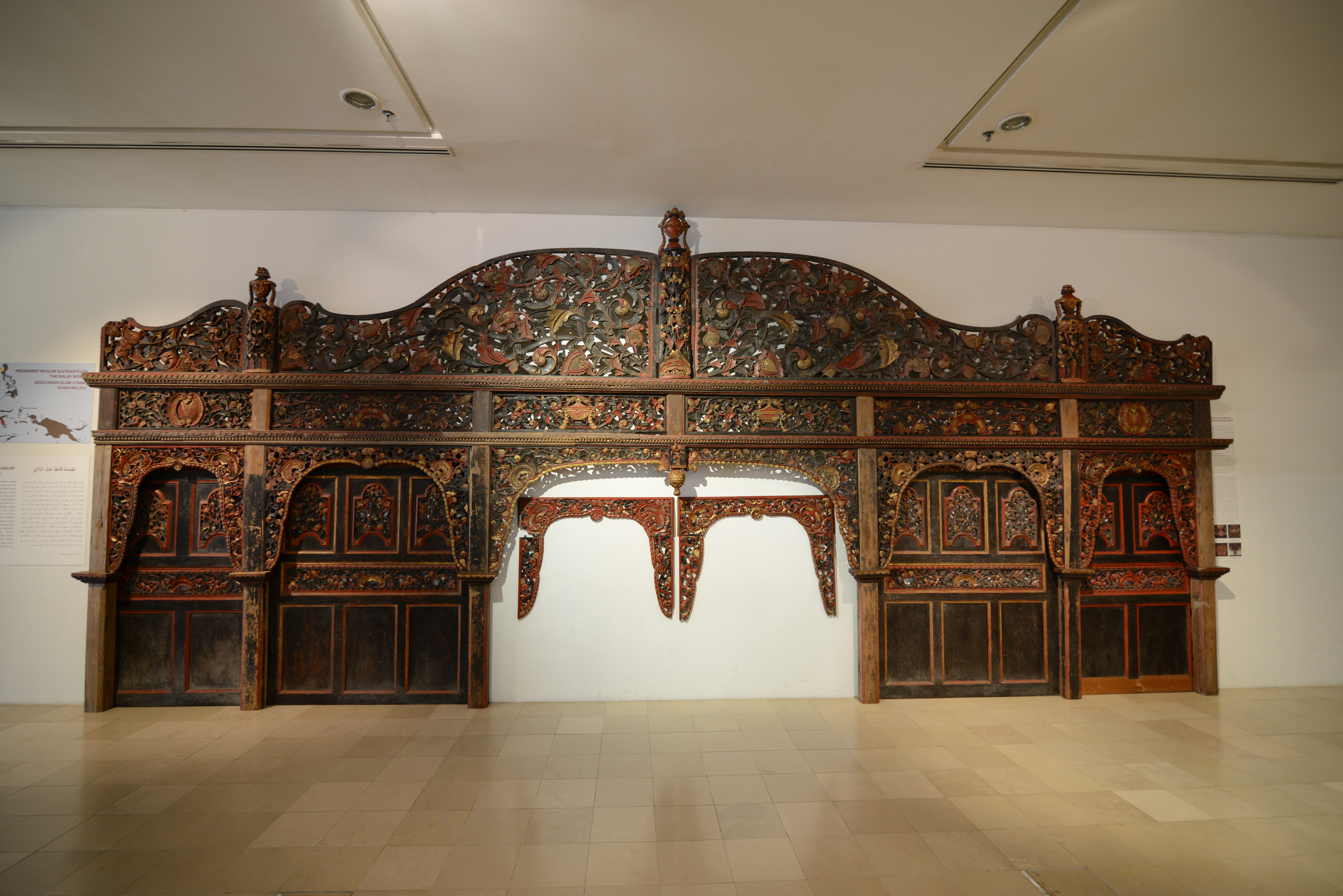
Islamic Arts Museum Malaysia
