= Tia Alkerdi =

Syrian model

- تيا الكردي
- Born: 1997 (age 28–29); Aleppo, Syria
- Citizenship: Syria
- Occupation: Model

Tia Alkerdi (born 1997) is a Syrian model and beauty pageant titleholder.

== Pageantry ==
She represented the first appearance of her country, Syria, at Miss Earth competition in 2020.

== Activism ==
Alkerdi joined the Ishtar feminist group and became involved in the issue of the Syrian woman, to provide aid and assistance to thousands of women affected by the Syrian war, and to polish the beauty of the figure with the beauty of thought.
