= Rizk =

Surname

Rizk is a surname. Notable people with the surname include:

- Amina Rizk (Arabic: أمينة رزق) (1910–2003), classic Egyptian actress
- Assad Rizk (1931–2020) (Arabic: أسعد رزق), (born 1931), Lebanese physician and politician
- Charles Rizk (Arabic: شارل رزق), (born 1935), Lebanese Maronite politician
- Dylan Rizk, American football player
- Elias Rizk (Arabic: الياس رزق), Lebanese actor
- Georgina Rizk (Arabic: جورجينا رزق), (born 1953), Lebanon's first and so far only Miss Universe
- Milad Rizk (Arabic: ميلاد رزق), (born 1972), Lebanese actor
- Sandra Rizk (Arabic: ساندرا رزق), (born 1982), Miss Lebanon 2000
