= Amar al-Husn =

Village in Syria

Amar al-Husn عمار الحصن
- Village
- 'Amar
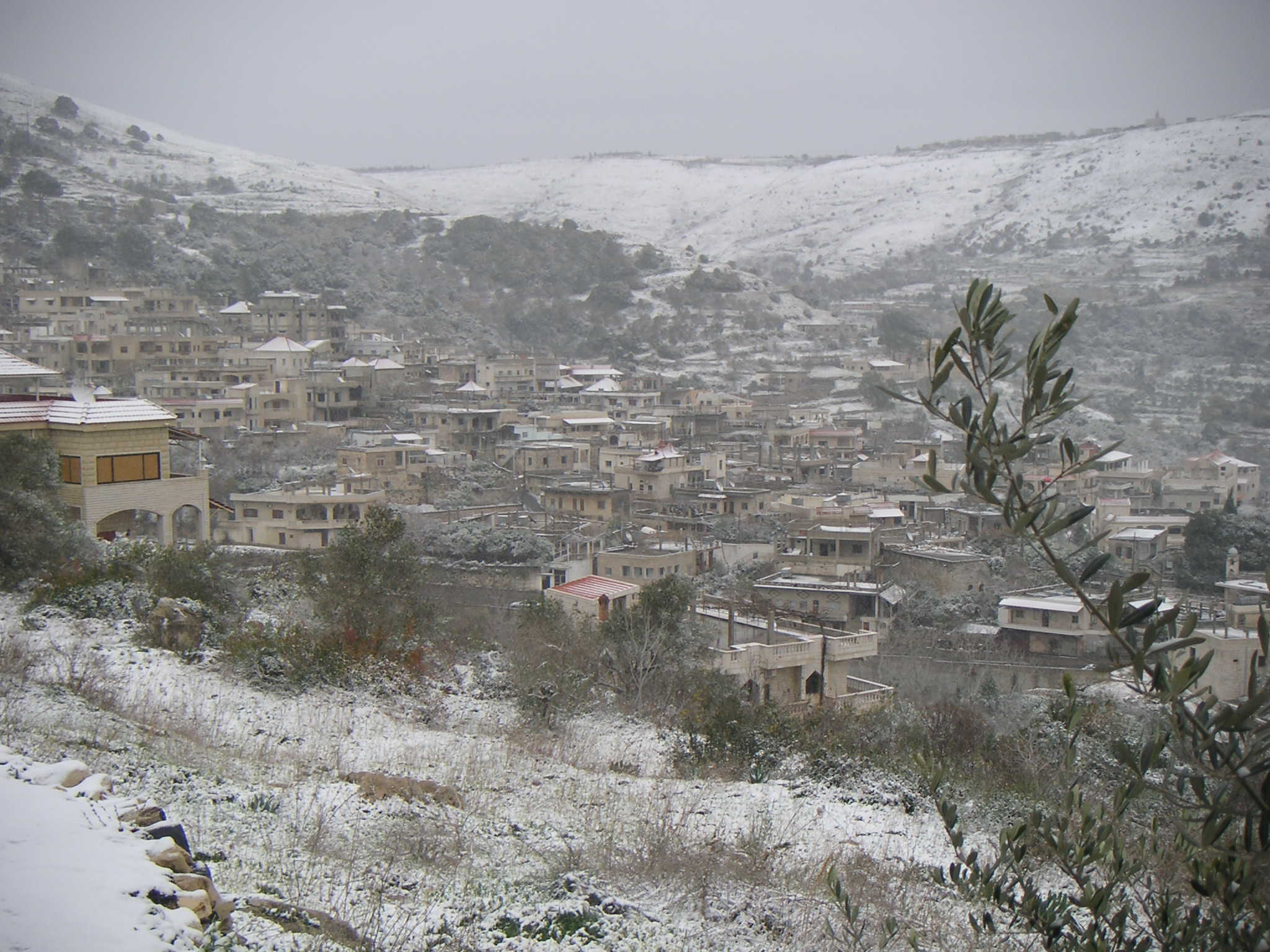
- View of Amar al-Husn, December 2008

- Location in Syria
- Coordinates: 34°45′18″N 36°15′53″E
- Country: Syria
- Governorate: Homs
- District: Talkalakh
- Subdistrict: Nasirah

Population (2004)
  - Total: 373
- Time zone: UTC+2 (EET)
  - Summer (DST): +3

Amar al-Husn (Arabic: عمار الحصن; also known simply as 'Amar) is a village in northern Syria located west of Homs in the Homs Governorate. According to the Syria Central Bureau of Statistics, Amar al-Husn had a population of 373 in the 2004 census. Its inhabitants are predominantly Christians. The village has an Antiochian Orthodox Church, a Greek Catholic Church and an Evangelical Presbyterian Church.

The First Syrian Olympic Medalist Joseph Atiyeh, in addition to the Antiguan politician and businessman Aziz Hadeed, were born in Amar al Husn

== Bibliography ==
- Robinson, E.; Smith, E. (1841). Biblical Researches in Palestine, Mount Sinai and Arabia Petraea: A Journal of Travels in the year 1838. Vol. 3. Boston: Crocker & Brewster.
