= Esin Atıl =

Turkish-American art historian and curator (1938–2020)

Esin Atıl (June 11, 1938 – February 20, 2020) was a Turkish-American historian of Islamic art and curator of Islamic art at the Freer Gallery of Art.

== Education ==
Esin Atıl graduated from the American College for Girls in Istanbul 1956 with BA degree. She received a second BA degree from the Western College for Women in 1958. She subsequently attended the Cranbrook Academy of Art where she studied painting and pottery. Atıl continued to graduate-level studies at the University of Michigan where she received her Ph.D. in 1969 with a thesis titled Surname-i Vehbi: An Eighteenth Century Ottoman Book of Festivals under the supervision of Oleg Grabar.

== Career ==
Subsequent to her graduation, Atıl was appointed in 1970 to the position of the curator of Near Eastern Art at the Freer Gallery of Art (Smithsonian Institution) in Washington, D.C., a position that she held until 1987. She continued working at the Freer Gallery in the position of Historian of Islamic Art until her retirement in 1993, following which she was appointed as a Research Associate. Her career is marked by a series of seminal and groundbreaking exhibitions of Islamic art, almost all of them accompanied by authoritative exhibition catalogues.

A specialist in the history of Ottoman art, Esin Atıl was the curator for the first major exhibition of the subject held at the National Gallery of Art in 1987. The exhibition was acclaimed as a milestone event, receiving both positive academic reviews and news coverage. The success of this exhibition especially led her to receive an honorary doctorate degree in 1987 from Boğaziçi University, citing her important contributions to the study of Turkish culture and history by means of seminal exhibitions and publications. In the same year, she also received the Grand Award for Culture and Art from the Ministry of Culture and Tourism in Turkey.
