= André Leconte =

French architect

Andre Leconte (1894–1966) was a French architect.

== Designs ==
The Lebanese government contracted with him to design Beirut International Airport at Khalde (1948–1954).

He also designed the Lazarieh office building (1953) in central Beirut, and Rizk hospital built in 1957 in Achrafieh.

Leconte also participated in the conception of Nouakchott, capital of then-French Mauritania, with the assistance of Robert Joly.

== Honours ==
Leconte received the "Prix de Rome" award.
