= Accademia di Belle Arti di Roma =

Art school in Rome, Italy

- Accademia di belle arti di Roma
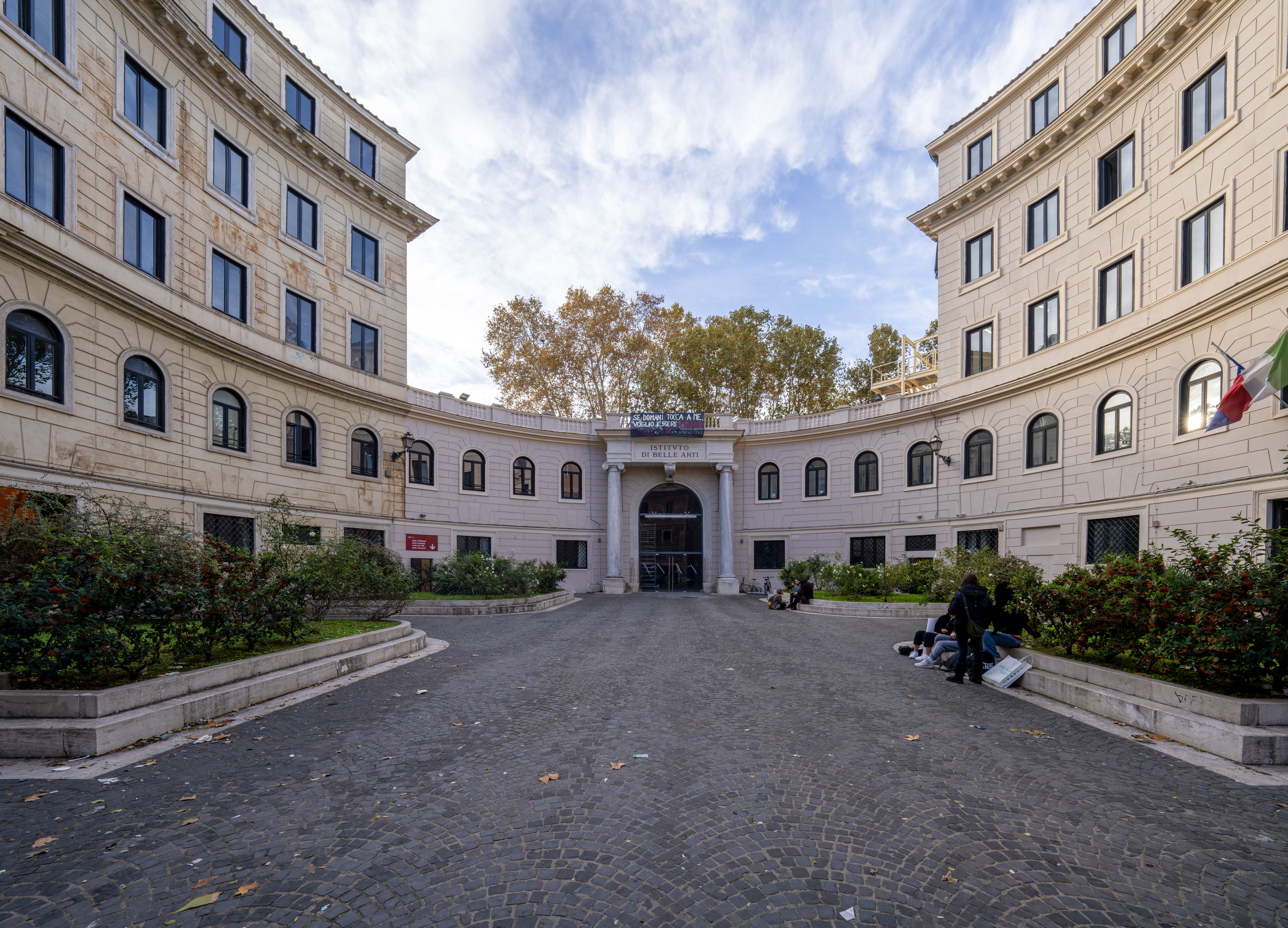
- The Accademia
- Type: Academy of art
- Established: Accademia di San Luca: 1577; Regio Istituto di Belle Arti di Roma: 1 January 1874
- Students: almost 2000
- Location: Rome, Lazio, Italy; 41.9075°N 12.4756°E
- Campus: Via di Ripetta 222, 00186 Roma
- Website: abaroma.it

The Accademia di Belle Arti di Roma is a public tertiary academy of art in Rome, Italy. It was founded in the sixteenth century, but the present institution dates from the time of the unification of Italy and the capture of Rome by the Kingdom of Italy in 1870.

== History ==
The Accademia di Belle Arti of Rome originates from the Accademia di San Luca ("academy of Saint Luke"), an association of painters, sculptors and architects founded in the latter part of the sixteenth century on the initiative of Girolamo Muziano and Federico Zuccari. The Scuola Libera del Nudo ("free school of the nude") for the teaching of life-drawing, was opened in 1754, and still exists; it offers free courses outside the academic framework of the academy.

The Accademia di Belle Arti di Roma was re-founded following the capture of Rome in 1870, after which Rome became the capital of Italy. After a petition from 50 artists requested a reform of the institution, which had previously been under Papal authority, all teaching staff were replaced and the academy was effectively nationalised. The name was at first Regia Accademia di Belle Arti denominata di San Luca, then Istituto di Belle Arti, and then was changed to Accademia di Belle Arti di Roma. Like other state art academies in Italy, it falls under the Ministero dell'Istruzione, dell'Universita e della Ricerca, the Italian ministry of education and research.
