= Rechter =

Rechter (Hebrew: רכטר) is a surname. Notable people with the surname include:

- Dafna Rechter (born 1965), Israeli actress and singer
- Yaakov Rechter (1924–2001), Israeli architect
- Yoni Rechter (born 1951), Israeli musician
- Zeev Rechter (1899–1960), Israeli architect
