= Inbal =

INBAL or Inbal may refer to:

== People ==
=== Given name ===
- Inbal Dror (born 1976), Israeli fashion designer
- Inbal Gavrieli (born 1975), former Israeli politician
- Inbal Perlmuter (1971–1997), Israeli composer
- Inbal Pezaro (born 1987), Israeli paralympic champion
- Inbal Rabin-Lieberman, (born 1998), Israeli security coordinator
- Inbal Schwarz (born 1984), Israeli paralympic swimmer
- Inbal Segev, cellist, who grew up in Israel

=== Surname ===
- Eliahu Inbal (born 1936), Israeli conductor

== Other uses ==
- Inbal Dance Theater, an Israeli dance company
- Inbal Jerusalem Hotel
- Instituto Nacional de Bellas Artes y Literatura (INBAL), the national Mexican institute of fine arts and literature
