= Aryeh Moskona =

Israeli actor and singer (1947–2025)

- אריה מוסקונה
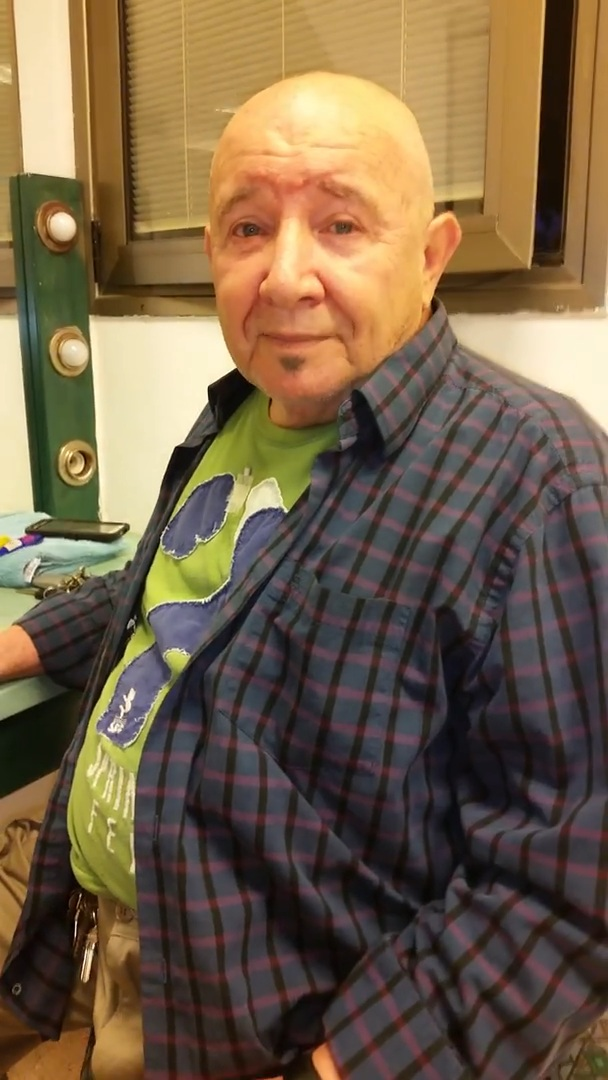
- Moskona in 2015
- Born: 29 July 1947; Sofia, Bulgaria
- Died: 20 September 2025 (aged 78); Tel Aviv, Israel
- Occupations: Actor; voice actor; singer
- Years active: 1971–2025
- Children: 4

Aryeh Moskona (Hebrew: אריה מוסקונה; 29 July 1947 – 20 September 2025) was an Israeli actor, voice actor and singer.

== Biography ==
Moskona was born in Bulgaria. His family moved to Israel when he was a year old, settling in HaKfar HaYarok. In 1967, he began his service with the IDF as a singer in the Northern Command Band. He performed with the Dizengoff Command Band alongside Moti Giladi. After his release from the IDF, he and Margalit Ankori performed a Hebrew cover version of the Pink Floyd song Another Brick in the Wall as part of a children's show. He continued to perform covers of rock and soul music in later years and frequently performed on stage.

On screen, Moskona appeared in more than 30 films, such as Kazablan, Operation Thunderbolt, Charlie and a Half and he also gained notability for his roles in Jacob Goldwasser’s 1991 film Beyond the Sea and in Julie Shles’s 1997 film Pick a Card. His television roles include a recurring role in the 1971 television series Hedva and Shlomik and another in the 2007 television series Arab Labor.

As a voice actor, Moskona voiced various characters in the plasticine animated show The Legends of King Solomon from 1992 to 1993. He also provided voice dubbings of characters into the Hebrew language. These include the voices of Mater in the Cars franchise, Colonel Hathi in The Jungle Book, Tito in Oliver & Company, Dandy Crow and Casey Junior in Dumbo and Duke Weaselton in Zootopia.

Moskona was a two-time recipient of the Ophir Award. In 1991, he won the Ophir Award for Best Leading Actor, then in 1997, he won the Ophir Award for Best Supporting Actor.

== Death ==
Moskona died in Tel Aviv on 20 September 2025, at the age of 78, due to complications of chronic obstructive pulmonary disease, after having previously battled cancer and multiple organ failure. He was survived by a wife, four daughters and ten grandchildren.

== Filmography ==
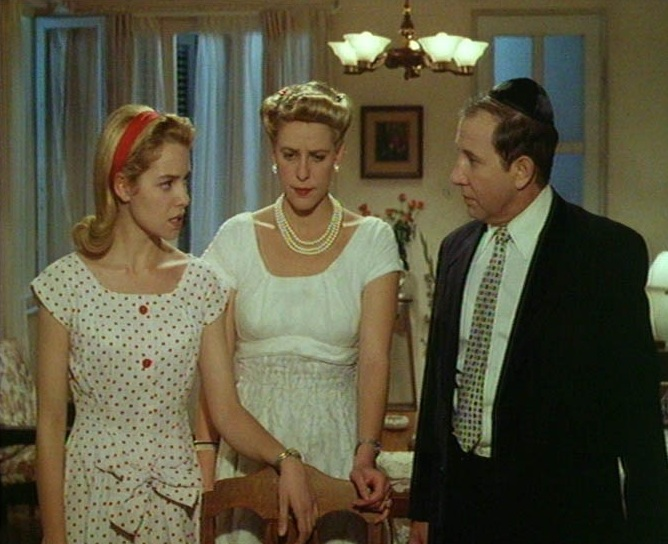
Moskona (right) with Mili Avital and Dafna Rechter in Beyond the Sea (1991)

=== Cinema ===
Year	Title	Role(s)	Notes
1973	Kazablan		
1974	Charlie and a Half	Neighbor	
1975	Diamonds	Avram	
1977	Operation Thunderbolt	Yitzchak Bloch	
1987	Red Riding Hood	Villager	
1991	Beyond the Sea	Menachem Goldfarb	
1992	American Samurai	Announcer	
1995	Passover Fever	Riki	
1997	As Tears Go By	Yaakov	
1997	Pick a Card	Shimon	
1999	Aaron Cohen's Debt	David	
2007	Love Life	Nathan	
