= Carlton Tel Aviv =

Hotel in Tel Aviv, Israel

Coordinates: 32.086517°N 34.769584°E

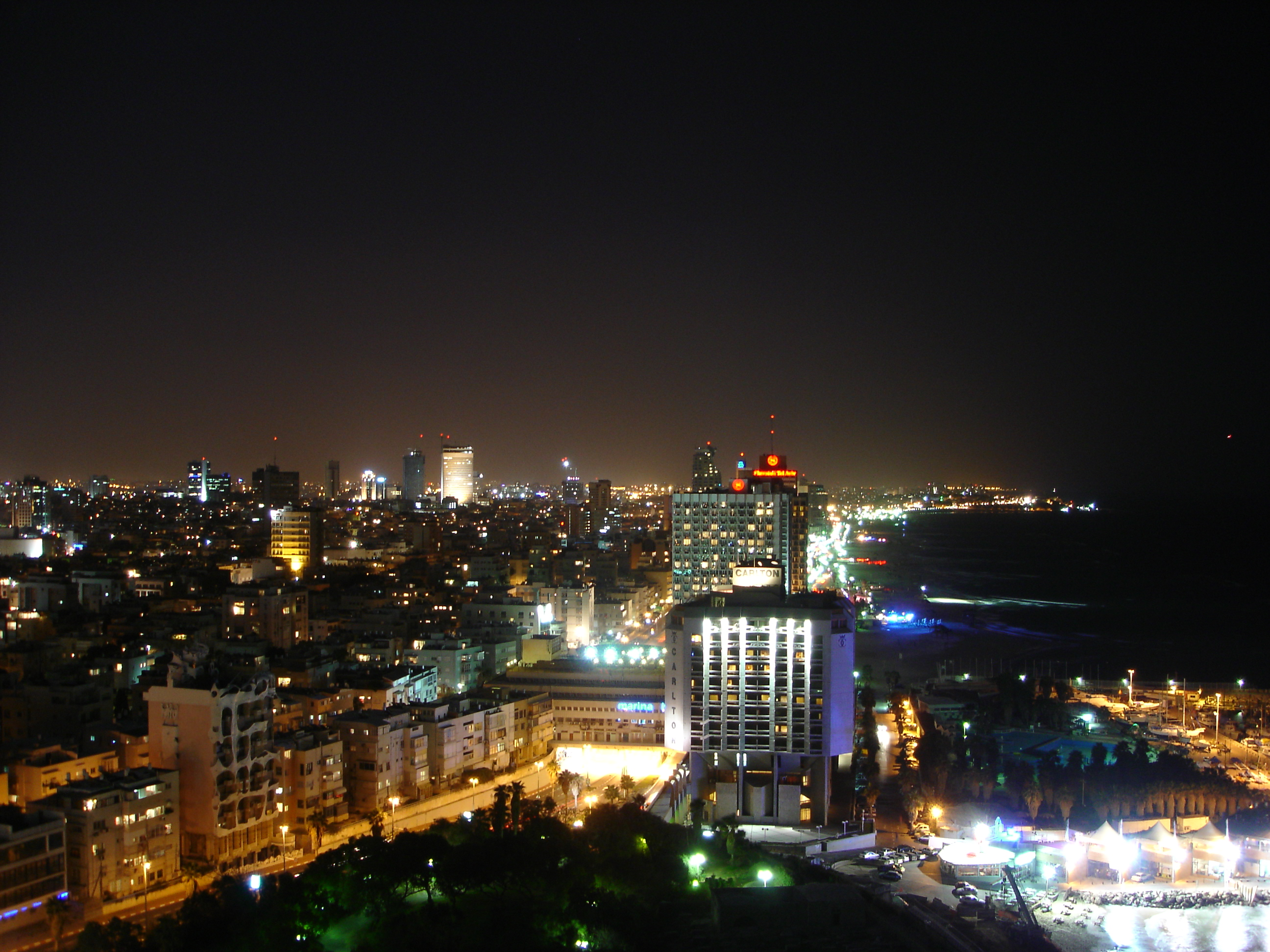
The Carlton Tel Aviv Hotel, seen from Hilton Tel Aviv

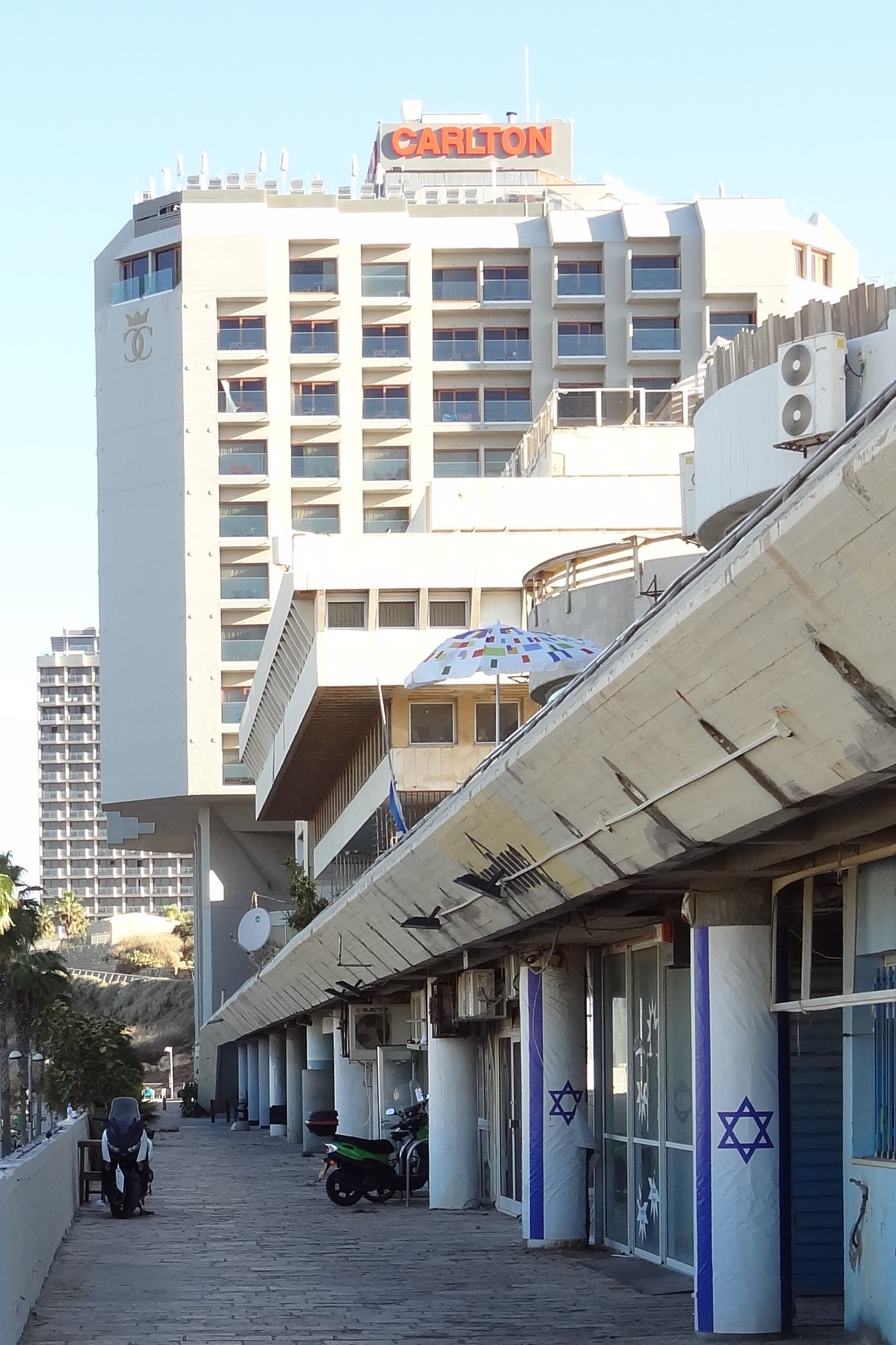
The Carlton Tel Aviv Hotel, seen from a lower level at Atarim Square

Carlton Tel Aviv is a five-star hotel in Tel Aviv, Israel, specialized in business travel. It is located near Atarim Square, in the immediate vicinity of Tel Aviv Port and the beach. It offers a view of the Mediterranean Sea.

== History and architecture ==
The hotel was built in 1977. In 2001 thorough renovation works were carried out, which cost $15 million. In 2017 it was renovated again for another $12 million.

The hotel is marked by an unusual shape: large floors relative to a narrow base. It is identified with brutalist architecture and was designed by Yaakov Rechter. The concrete building has 15 floors.

The hotel may be rebuilt as part of a redevelopment plan of Atarim Square.

== Facilities ==
The hotel has 268 hotel rooms and suites. There is a conference room with facilities for the support of organized groups. The hotel has two swimming pools, of which one on the roof. There is a synagogue on the second floor.

The hotel has three restaurants:

- Blue Sky
- Lumina
- Carlton on the Beach

The restaurants are led by chef Meir Adoni.
