= Beyond the Sea (1991 film) =

1991 Israeli drama film

- Directed by: Jacob Goldwasser
- Written by: Haim Marin
- Produced by: Ronni Akerman; Marek Rozenbaum
- Starring: Aryeh Moskona; Dafna Rechter; Moti Giladi; Mili Avital; Yair Lapid
- Cinematography: David Gurfinkel
- Edited by: Anat Lubarsky
- Music by: Shlomo Gronich
- Release date: 1991
- Running time: 91 minutes
- Country: Israel
- Language: Hebrew

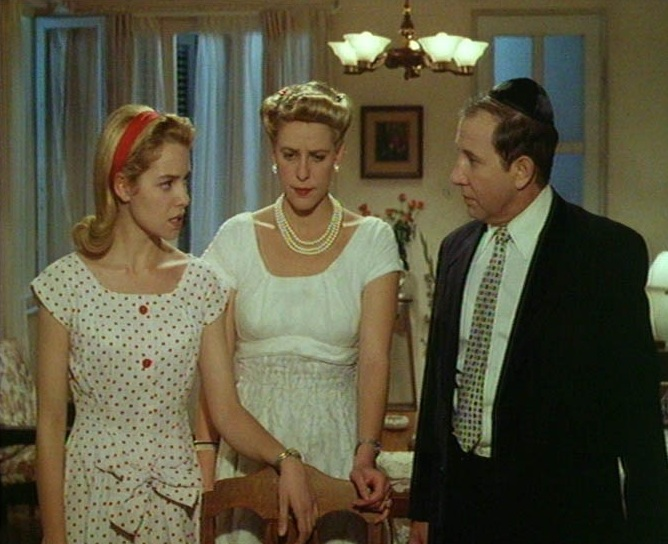
Mili Avital, Dafna Rechter, and Aryeh Moskona.

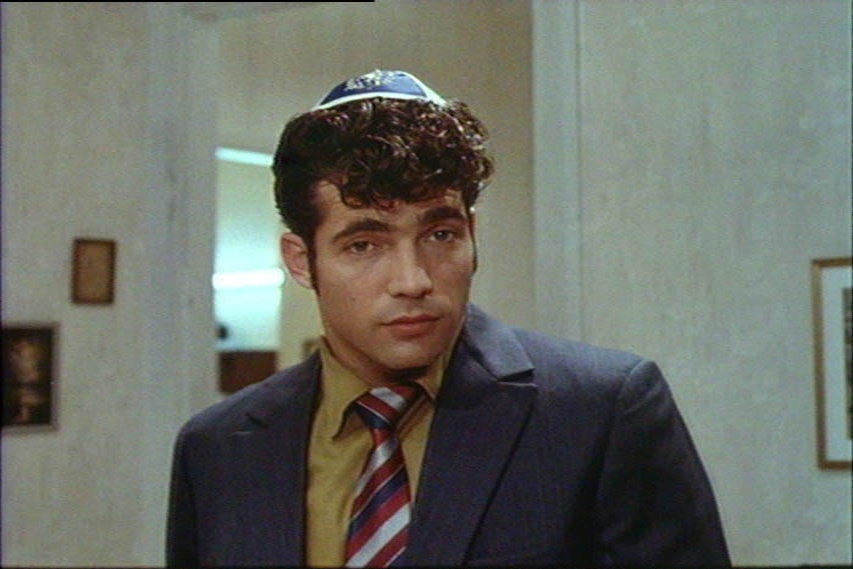
Yair Lapid in a scene from the film.

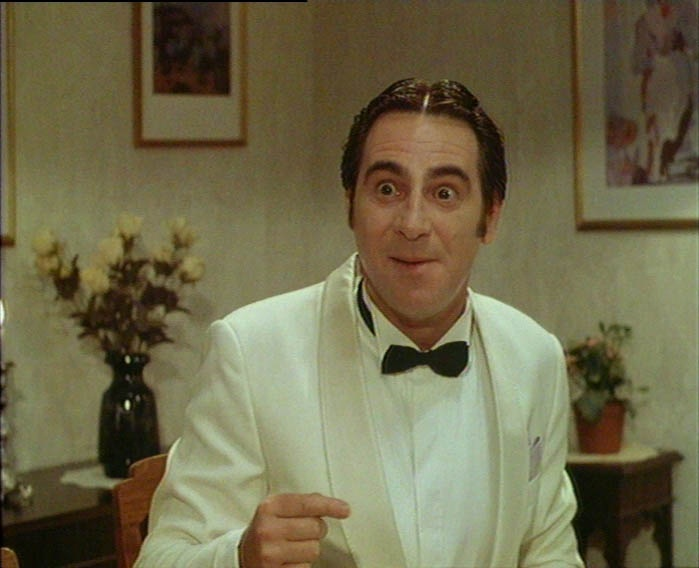
Moti Giladi in a scene from the film.

Beyond the Sea (Hebrew: מעבר לים, romanized: Me'ever Layam, also known as Over the Ocean) is a 1991 Israeli drama film directed by Jacob Goldwasser. It stars Aryeh Moskona, Dafna Rechter, Moti Giladi, and Mili Avital. Yair Lapid, who later became Prime Minister of Israel, was also in the cast.

The film, a family drama set in the 1960s, explores Holocaust survivors' relationship with Israel in its early years and their dilemma over whether to stay in the country or emigrate, as seen through the eyes of a child.

It was critically acclaimed and won the Ophir Award for Best Film. The film was selected as the Israeli entry for the Best Foreign Language Film at the 64th Academy Awards, but was not accepted as a nominee.

== Plot ==
In the film, Aryeh Moskona and Dafna Rechter play the role of Menachem and Rosa Greenberg, a couple of hard-pressed Holocaust survivors. Their friend, Maurice Greenspan (Motti Giladi), made his fortune in Canada in shady deals, and he is a stubborn type who implores the couple to emigrate from Israel to a better life in Canada. The Greenburgs' son, Haim "Haymon" Greenberg (Uri Alter), is aware of the growing conflicts in his parents' house due to the financial difficulties and the intervention of the mysterious friend, who secretly wooed his mother. His sister, Miri, (Milli Avital), a dull ten year old girl, that was captivated by Schultz "Haunterwaltnik" Pushtek's (Yair Lapid) charm. Additional participants in the film are Oshik Levy, as a taxi driver, a neighbor and friend of Menachem and Rosa Greenberg, Shai Adelson as Haymon's best friend and son of the taxi driver, Sinai Peter as Uncle Lazer from the kibbutz, who represents the Zionist antithesis to Morris' exile and slipperiness. In the end, after a crisis that threatens the world of one of the Greenberg's child, the family decides to stay in Israel.

== Production and distribution ==
The screenplay was written by Haim Marin, marking the third film directed by Jacob Goldwasser based on his script. Though the screenplay was completed in 1986, difficulties in securing investors delayed production for several years. The film was eventually produced with support from the Fund for Quality Film Promotion and additional funding from Israeli Television. The plot is loosely based on Goldwasser's biography, who immigrated with his parents to Australia at age 12, but returned after a year. The film was shot by cinematographer David Gurfinkel at Kibbutz Nir Eliahu.

The film won most of the 1991 Ophir Awards in the categories: Best Picture, Best Director (Jacob Goldwasser), Best Actor (Aryeh Moskona), Best Actress (Dafna Rechter), Best Supporting Actress (Mili Avital), Best Screenplay (Haim Marin), Best Editing (Anat Lubarsky), Best Art Direction (Emmanuel Amrami) and Best Composer (Shlomo Gronich). The film was also selected as Israel's submission for the Academy Award for Best Foreign Film.

== See also ==
- List of submissions to the 64th Academy Awards for Best Foreign Language Film
- List of Israeli submissions for the Academy Award for Best Foreign Language Film
