= After the Storm (2001 film) =

2001 film by Guy Ferland

- DVD cover
- Written by: Ernest Hemingway; A. E. Hotchner
- Directed by: Guy Ferland
- Starring: Benjamin Bratt; Mili Avital; Armand Assante; Simone-Élise Girard
- Music by: Bill Wandel
- Original language: English

Production
- Producers: Kenneth Teaton; Mike Elliot
- Running time: 99 minutes
- Production company: Trimark Pictures

Original release
- Network: USA Network
- Release: March 20, 2001

After the Storm is a 2001 American adventure film starring Benjamin Bratt, Mili Avital, Armand Assante, and Simone-Élise Girard. The story centers around the efforts of a group of people to salvage valuables from a sunken yacht in the Bahamas in 1933 and their schemes to betray and double-cross one another.

The film is based on the 1933 short story "After the Storm" by Ernest Hemingway with a screenplay by A. E. Hotchner. Originally intended for theatrical release, it instead was broadcast as a television film in the United States on the USA Network.

== Plot ==
Arno — a World War I veteran whose father followed Arno's advice to invest heavily in stocks and hanged himself after losing the family's money in the Wall Street Crash of 1929 — left everything behind after his mother also died soon afterward, taking with him only his father's expensive pocket watch. He lives alone in a beachfront shack in the Bahamas with only a pet parrot for company and ekes out a living as a beachcomber, travelling among the islands on his boat Caca de Toro and selling items he finds washed up on the beach.

While in town one day in 1933, Arno discovers that Coquina, a woman he is attracted to, has returned from a three-year stay with her uncle on another island. Coquina's grandmother dislikes Arno and wishes Coquina to marry Thomas, a shopkeeper with greater financial security than the indebted and impoverished Arno, but Arno makes romantic overtures to Coquina, and a romantic relationship soon develops between them. Arno visits Janine, a married woman with whom he has a sexual relationship, and announces that their relationship is over.

Arno also encounters Janine's husband Jean-Pierre, a Frenchman who operates a boat named La Chamade that he uses both for marine salvage work and to offer charter cruises as a gigolo for wealthy female tourists. Aboard the La Chamade is Ortega, a shady associate of Arno's for whom Jean-Pierre often works. Ortega needs Arno's boat and knowledge of Cuban waters for an illegal voyage to Cuba and offers Arno US$500 to work with him, but Arno dislikes Ortega and turns him down. Ortega approaches the corrupt local police chief, Sergeant Major Jim, and they concoct a plot to blackmail Arno into working for Ortega.

Aboard the Caca de Toro, Arno comes across a yacht, the Pride of Chicago, and is invited aboard. The yacht's owner, a rich American bootlegger, hires him to take a package to Bimini and the bootlegger's ailing wife asks him to pick up a package of medication for her as well while he is there. After Arno picks up her package on Bimini, one of Sergeant Major Jim's constables attempts to take it from him, but one of Arno's friends suddenly appears and assaults the constable, allowing Arno to escape just as a severe storm strikes. Arno seeks shelter in the bar and restaurant of a hotel. Sergeant Major Jim, Ortega, Janine, and Jean-Pierre all are there. Sergeant Major Jim seizes Arno's package, finds it contains heroin, and threatens Arno with arrest. Ortega intervenes, offering to pay Arno's bail if he will take the Cuba job Ortega is offering. A fight breaks out and Ortega pulls a knife, but Arno wrestles the knife away and stabs Ortega with it. Accused of killing Ortega, Arno escapes into the storm aboard the Caca de Toro. He and his boat survive the storm, but he discovers the next morning that his father's watch has broken during the ordeal.

Arno tries to find the Pride of Chicago to deliver the package he picked up on Bimini, but discovers that the yacht sank in the storm and lies upside down on the ocean bottom in shallow water. Through portholes, he sees the drowned bodies of women he had met aboard the yacht, still adorned with expensive jewelry. He lacks the diving and salvage equipment necessary to enter the wreck and retrieve the jewelry. Determined to salvage valuables from the wreck before anyone else can, he returns to town and finds Coquina. The two of them steal diving equipment from Thomas's family and return to the wreck of the Pride of Chicago, but the stolen equipment malfunctions and Arno almost drowns. Coquina saves him.

Ortega, it turns out, suffered only a minor stab wound in his fight with Arno. He hires Jean-Pierre to find Arno and bring him in for a reward. Jean-Pierre has heard about US$1 million in gold in a safe aboard the sunken Pride of Chicago and that a major search for her wreck has begun. Aboard the La Chamade, Jean-Pierre and Janine soon find the Caca de Toro. Arno and Jean-Pierre make a deal: Jean-Pierre — unable to dive due to eardrum damage — will not report the wanted Arno to the authorities or take him to Ortega and will provide diving and salvage equipment. In exchange, Arno will reveal the location of the Pride of Chicago, do the diving to bring up valuables from the wreck, and agree to split the profits. Jean-Pierre does not tell Arno about the gold aboard the yacht or that Ortega is alive.

Arno begins diving on the wreck and retrieving expensive jewelry from the bodies inside her hull, narrowly avoiding an attack by a shark swimming inside the wreck. Arno and Jean-Pierre divide up the day's salvaged valuables that evening, hiding their shares so that neither can steal from the other. Arno and Coquina have sex, and afterwards he gives her his father's watch to wear around her neck. On his next dive, he makes his first attempt to enter the wreck and nearly suffocates when his air hose snags on the wreck; Coquina saves him again.

Arno secretly keeps some of the salvaged jewelry for himself without letting Jean-Pierre know he had found it in the wreck, and he takes it to Sergeant Major Jim to bribe Jim to drop the murder charges he believes have been lodged against him. Jim accepts the bribe, then tells Arno that Ortega is alive and well. Arno returns to the La Chamade and accuses Jean-Pierre of lying to him about Ortega. A fight ensues, Arno throws Jean-Pierre overboard, and Arno pulls him back aboard only after Jean-Pierre informs him of the gold that is aboard the Pride of Chicago.

While Arno makes a night dive on the Pride of Chicago, Jean-Pierre suggests to Coquina that Arno might betray her, take all the gold, and run off with Janine. He suggests that they double-cross Arno and Janine and split the profits with one another, and even that they could kill Arno by shutting off the air compressor feeding him air during his dive. In the wreck, the shark attacks Arno; he escapes, but loses the diving helmet and diving suit. Arno and Jean-Pierre go ashore and procure explosives with which to blow the safe open and an open-bottomed diving bell that will make up for the loss of the diving helmet and suit by allowing Arno to catch breaths of air without having to come to the surface. While they are gone, Janine confides in Coquina, telling her that she plans to leave Jean-Pierre as soon as the salvage operation is over and that Coquina should be careful about Arno abandoning her, especially when she is older and less beautiful. When Arno and Jean-Pierre return, Coquina tells Arno that Jean-Pierre plans to steal his share, and Arno says that she should play along and that they will turn the tables on Jean-Pierre by stealing his share instead.

Janine accompanies Arno in the diving bell on his next dive, a night dive in which he detonates the explosives to open the safe aboard the Pride of Chicago. As he visits the diving bell to breathe, Janine proposes that they double-cross Coquina and Jean-Pierre, keep all the treasure for themselves, and run off together. Arno plays along and agrees with her. On the La Chamade, Jean-Pierre asks Coquina to join him in double-crossing Arno and Janine; Coquina agrees to the double-cross. At the wreck, Arno and Janine recover the gold, but the shark returns and attacks Janine through the open bottom of the diving bell, killing her and swimming off with her body.

Back aboard the La Chamade, Jean-Pierre blames Arno for Janine's death, and Coquina appears to take Jean-Pierre's side. Ortega and one of his henchmen suddenly storm aboard and try to take all the salvaged valuables for themselves at gunpoint. In an effort to appease Ortega, Arno and Jean-Pierre both reveal the hiding places for their shares of the treasure aboard the La Chamade, but a struggle ensues. Ortega stabs Arno in the shoulder but Jean-Pierre shoots Ortega and Arno picks up a fallen handgun and shoots his henchman, killing them.

Coquina tells Arno that she sided with Jean-Pierre in the argument over Janine's death merely to play along with Jean-Pierre in his scheme to double-cross Arno. With Arno's knowledge, Coquina drugs Jean-Pierre so that she and Arno can flee with all the salvaged gold and treasure, but Arno wakes up the next morning to find that Coquina also drugged him, and that she has disappeared in a skiff, taking all the gold and jewels for herself. He laughs ironically when Sergeant Major Jim arrives on another boat to arrest Jean-Pierre and him for possession of the gold.

Arno returns to his life as a beachcomber. One day he stops by the bar where he picks up his mail and receives a package. It contains his father's watch, which Coquina has had repaired and mailed back to him.

== Cast ==
- Benjamin Bratt as Arno
- Mili Avital as Coquina
- Armand Assante as Jean-Pierre
- Simone-Élise Girard as Janine
- Nestor Serrano as Ortega
- Stephen Lang as Sergeant Major Jim

== Screenplay ==
A. E. Hotchner, a playwright, novelist, and editor who was a friend and biographer of Ernest Hemingway and had previously adapted Hemingway's The Snows of Kilimanjaro, The Killers, and The Fifth Column for television, wrote the screenplay for After the Storm, basing it on a seven-page Hemingway short story of the same name published in the May 1932 issue of Cosmopolitan. Hemingway based the short story on a purportedly true story a charter-boat captain in Key West, Florida, told him in 1928 about a conch-fisherman's account of the sinking of the Spanish steamer Valbanera with the loss of all 488 people on board on September 9, 1919, during the 1919 Florida Keys hurricane. The short story's anonymous narrator gives a first-person account of escaping a bar fight by slashing his assailant with a knife and fleeing in a skiff to hide out in the belief that he had killed the man. The narrator comes across the wreck of an ocean liner in shallow water. He dives on the wreck and through a porthole sees a dead woman wearing jewelry, but he is unable to break the glass in the porthole to reach the jewelry. He returns to shore, discovers that the man he slashed did not die, and learns that the liner – reportedly carrying gold on board in a safe – had sunk when she sprang a leak during a storm and her boilers exploded, killing her entire crew and all 450 passengers aboard. He waits for a week for stormy weather to subside before returning to the wreck, then discovers that people he refers to as "the Greeks" had blown the wreck open with dynamite and taken all the gold and valuables aboard. He laments having made no money off his discovery of the sunken liner.

Although the location of Hemingway's story – apparently the Florida Keys – is ambiguous at best and it provides no dates for its events, Hotchner sets the film in the Bahamas in 1933. Like Hemingway's anonymous narrator, Hotchner's Arno character believes he stabbed a man to death in a bar fight, flees to avoid arrest, and discovers a sunken vessel containing the body of a woman (two women in the film version) wearing jewelry, although the unnamed ocean liner in Hemingway's story is replaced by the yacht Pride of Chicago in the film. Like the short story's narrator, the film's Arno character returns to shore, discovers that he did not kill his assailant in the bar fight, and returns to the wreck in the hope of salvaging valuables from it. Like the narrator, Arno ends up with nothing. Otherwise, the film adds a great deal of narrative that does not exist in the short story. Like the narrator's unnamed assailant, Ortega fights with Arno and is stabbed, but neither Ortega or any of the other characters in the film appear in the short story. The anonymous narrator has no equivalent to Arno's back story about his father and his father's watch or to his romance with Coquina, his relationship with Janine, or his associations with Jean-Pierre, Ortega, or Sergeant Major Jim, and the narrator deals with none of the schemes and double-crosses the film's characters do. Unlike Arno, the narrator encounters no shark while diving. While in the short story the narrator finds that someone else has dynamited the ocean liner's wreck and made off with the valuables, in the film Arno dynamites the sunken yacht himself and only loses the gold and jewelry he salvaged when Coquina steals it from him.

== Production ==
=== Location ===
After the Storm was filmed on Belize′s Ambergris Caye in the Caribbean Sea. Production began in March 2000.

=== Film format ===
After the Storm was filmed in Super 35 with a 2.35:1 aspect ratio. It was printed in anamorphic format.

== Broadcast ==
Originally intended for a theatrical release, After the Storm failed to secure one. Instead, it was licensed to the USA Network, on which it premiered as a television movie on March 20, 2001.

== Awards ==
After the Storm was named Best Feature Film at the 2000 New York International Independent Film and Video Festival and its director, Guy Ferland, was individually commended on the realism he brought to the film with underwater photography.

== Home media ==
With footage added to it that gave it an "R" rating, After the Storm was released as a Region 1 widescreen DVD on May 29, 2001.

== See also ==
- List of American films of 2001
