= Dafna Rechter =

Israeli actress and singer (born 1965)

- דפנה רכטר
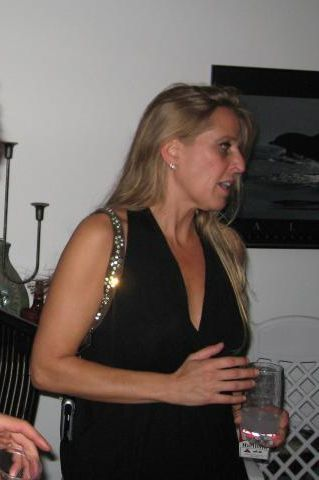
- Born: 15 July 1965 (age 60); Israel
- Occupation: Actress
- Years active: 1984–present
- Children: 1

Dafna Rechter (Hebrew: דפנה רכטר; born 15 July 1965) is an Israeli actress and singer. She is a two-time winner of the Ophir Award for Best Actress.

== Biography ==
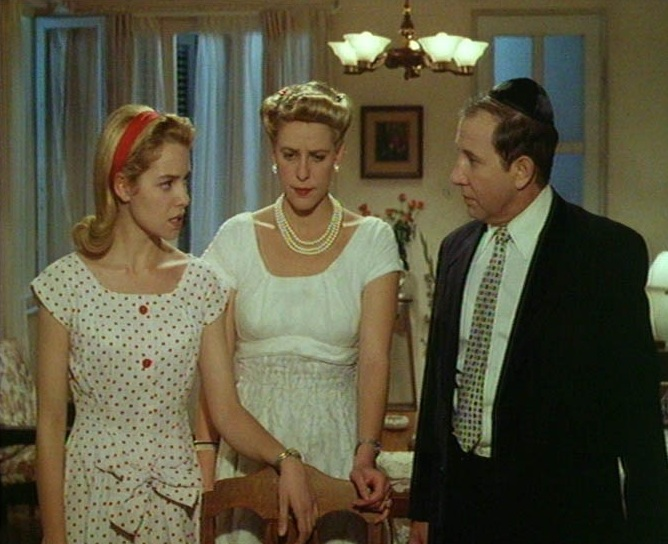
Mili Avital, Dafna Rechter, and Aryeh Moskona in Jacob Goldwasser's 1991 film Beyond the Sea

Dafna Rechter is the daughter of architect Yaakov Rechter and actress Hanna Meron. She is the sister of architect Amnon Rechter and logician Ofra Rechter, as well as the half-sister of musician Yoni Rechter and illustrator Michal Levit from her father's first marriage.

Rechter is a vegan and known for her contribution to the struggle for animal rights. She is divorced and has one child, born in 1996.

Rechter has spoken openly about her complex relationship with her mother.

== Filmography ==
- Beyond the Sea
- Urban Feel
