= Animals (1998 film) =

- Directed by: Michael Di Jiacomo
- Written by: Michael Di Jiacomo
- Produced by: Gabrielle Tana
- Starring: Tim Roth; Mili Avital; John Turturro
- Cinematography: Alik Sakharov
- Production companies: Pandora Cinema; Hollywood Partners
- Release date: 1998
- Running time: 103 minutes
- Country: United States
- Language: English

Animals is a 1998 American fantasy romance film written and directed by Michael Di Jiacomo in his directorial debut, and starring Tim Roth, Mili Avital and John Turturro.

== Cast ==
- Tim Roth as Henry
- Mili Avital as Fatima
- Rod Steiger as Fontina
- Barbara Bain as The Mother
- John Turturro as Tuxedo Man
- Mickey Rooney as Tollkeeper
- Lothaire Bluteau as Young Laurent
- Jacques Herlin as Laurent
- O-Lan Jones as Essie

== Production ==
Filming occurred in South Carolina in March 1997. The opening black-and-white 13-minute segment The Tollkeeper was shot in December 1996 in Utah.

== Reception ==
The Mail & Guardian gave the film a positive review: "Di Jiacomo’s screenplay for Animals blurs the levels of accepted reality and the magical, and while this may reveal a fascination with magical realism that is now becoming popular in films, its use here makes for an imaginatively coloured, whimsical story that even manages to pack a startling ending."

Kaori Shoji of The Japan Times awarded the film three stars.
