= Hanna Maron =

German-born Israeli actress (1923–2014)

- חנה מרון
- Maron during a rehearsal in 1957
- Born: Hanna Meierzak; 22 November 1923; Berlin, Germany
- Died: 30 May 2014 (aged 90); Tel Aviv, Israel
- Occupations: Actress and theater personality
- Years active: 1927–2014
- Spouse(s): 1. Yossi Yadin; 2. Itzhak Yashar; 3. Yaakov Rechter
- Children: Dafna Rechter, Amnon Rechter
- Awards: 1973 Israel Prize in theatre

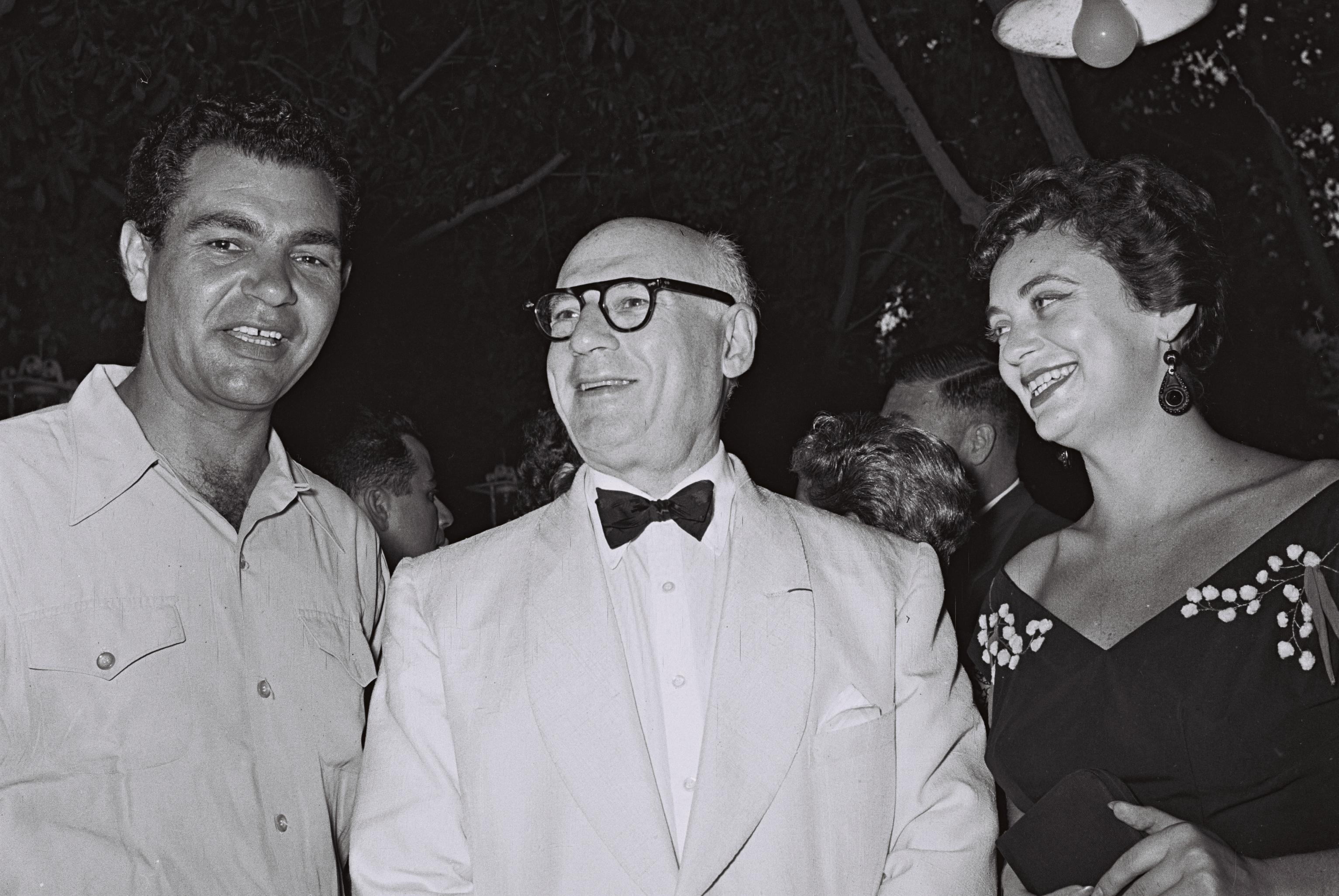
Hanna Maron (right) with Yossi Yadin (left) and Sol Hurok (middle), 1954

Hanna Maron (Hebrew: חנה מרון, romanized: Chana Maron; 22 November 1923 – 30 May 2014) was a German-born Israeli actress, comedian and theatre personality. She held the world record for the longest career in theater.

== Life and career ==
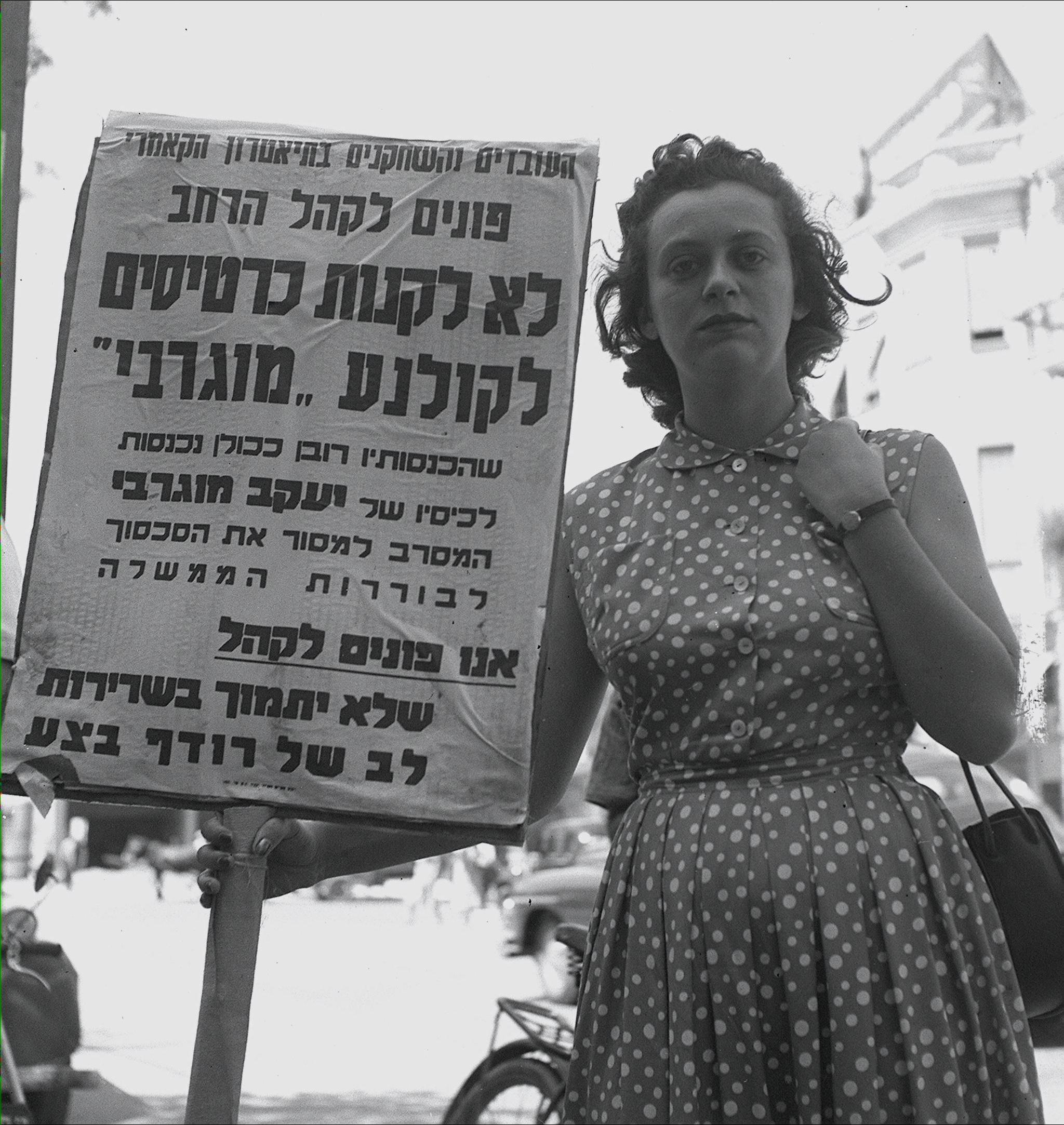
Hanna Meron demonstrates against the proprietors of the Mugrabi movie theater in Tel Aviv, 1950

Hanna Meierzak was born in Berlin, Germany on 22 November 1923. Her father, Isaac, was an electrician. As a child, her mother, Rosa, encouraged her acting career and enrolled her in a special school where she studied with the children of foreign diplomats. She appeared in stage productions, films, and radio plays. In 1931 she appeared uncredited in Fritz Lang's M. In 1932, she and her mother left Berlin for Paris. In 1933, she immigrated with her family to Mandate Palestine. The family settled in Tel Aviv and her father became the first immigrant to be hired by the Palestine Electric Company.

In 1940, Meron joined Habimah. During World War II, she volunteered for the Auxiliary Territorial Service of the British army, serving two years before joining the Jewish Brigade's entertainment troupe. In 1945 she joined the Cameri Theater in Tel Aviv. As a member of the repertory committee, she helped shape the company's repertoire, including new works by Israeli dramatists. Early on, she appeared in supporting roles, but after her success as Mika in He Walked in the Fields by Moshe Shamir, she became one of Israel's leading actresses.

She married a fellow actor, Yossi Yadin (son of the archaeologist Eleazar Sukenik and brother of the Israeli Chief of Staff Yigael Yadin). They were together for six years. Among her better known roles were in Pygmalion, The Glass Menagerie and Hello, Dolly!, as well as several plays by Nathan Alterman.

On 10 February 1970, the airport bus transport to her London-bound El Al flight at the Munich-Riem Airport was attacked by Palestinian terrorists. Sustaining serious injuries in a grenade attack, her leg had to be amputated, but she resumed her acting career a year later. She remained a peace activist.

She starred in the films Aunt Clara (1977), The Vulture (1981) and Dead End Street (1982). From 1983 to 1986 she starred in the Israeli sitcom Krovim, Krovim ("Near Ones, Dear Ones"). In 2000 she initiated and founded the Herzliya Theater Ensemble. She directed and participated in an evening of Alterman poems, and on an evening of Bertolt Brecht's works. In late 2003, she returned to the Cameri to play in a comedy. In 2004 she starred in a theater event that reenacted an IDF refuseniks' trial.

She was married to architect Yaakov Rechter, with whom she had three children: Amnon, an architect, Ofra, a philosopher, and Dafna, an actress.

Hanna Maron died in Tel-Aviv, Israel on 30 May 2014, aged 90.

== Legacy in popular culture ==
A new graphic novel biography is due to appear in German in September 2016: Barbara Yelin, Vor allem eins: Dir selbst sei treu. Die Schauspielerin Channa Maron, lit. First and foremost: be true to yourself. Actress Hanna Maron.

In 2017, an exhibition was created by Barbara Yelin and David Polonsky after Yelin's graphic novel. It was shown at German high schools (the Heinz Berggruen Gymnasium in Berlin and the Humboldt Gymnasium at Vaterstetten), the Berlin International Literature Festival, and the Goethe Institutes in Tel Aviv and Jerusalem.

== Awards and honours ==
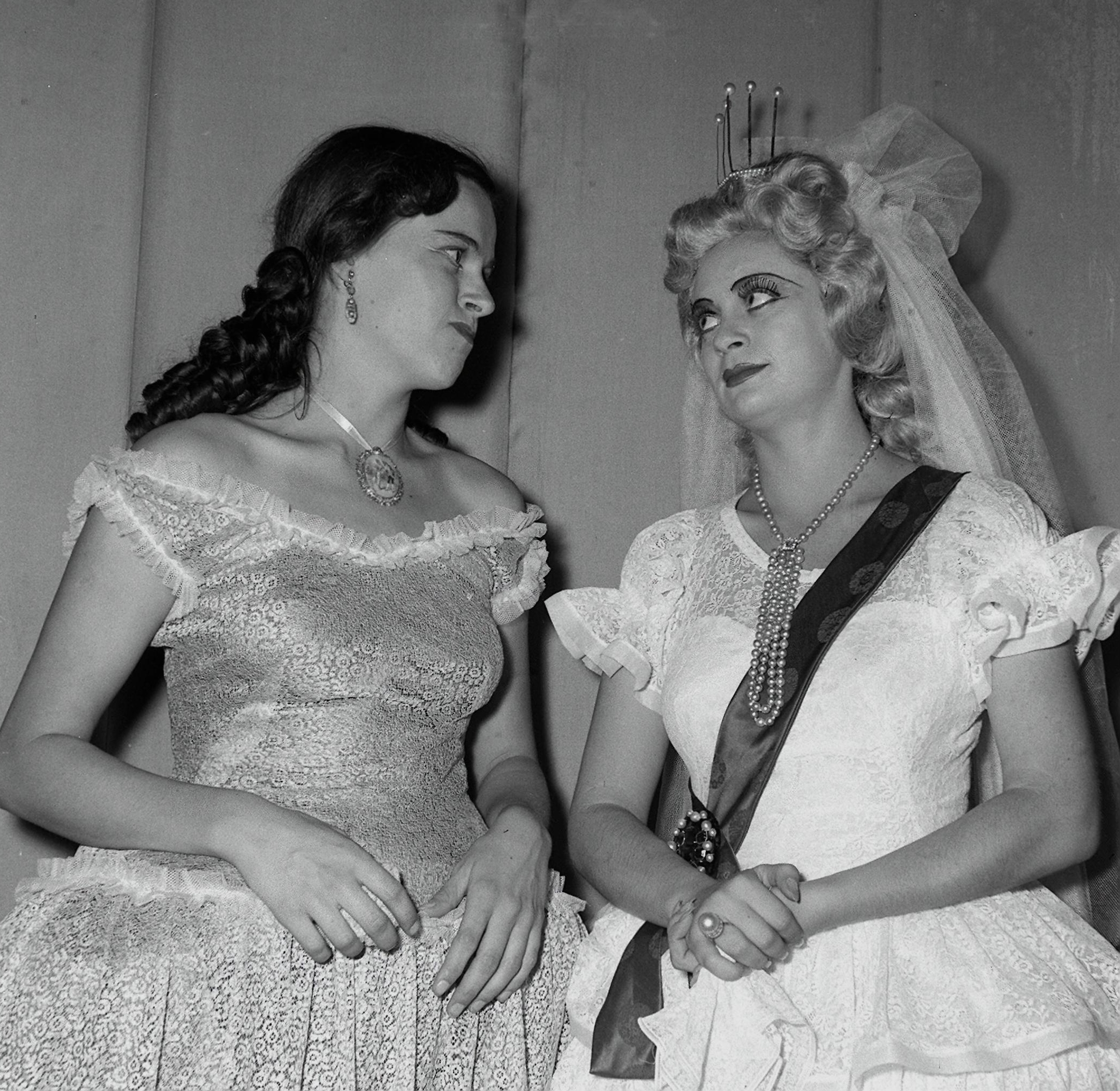
Hanna Maron and Orna Porat, 1949

- In 1971, she was awarded the Herzl Award for her work in arts.
- In 1973, Maron was awarded the Israel Prize in theatre.
- In 1994, she received an honorary doctorate from Tel Aviv University.
- In 2007, she received an honorary doctorate from Ben-Gurion University.
- Ynet dubbed her "The first lady of Israeli theater".
- She was cited as an inspiration by many Israeli actors, including Yehoram Gaon and Gila Almagor.

== See also ==
- List of Israel Prize recipients
