= Mivtachim Sanitarium =

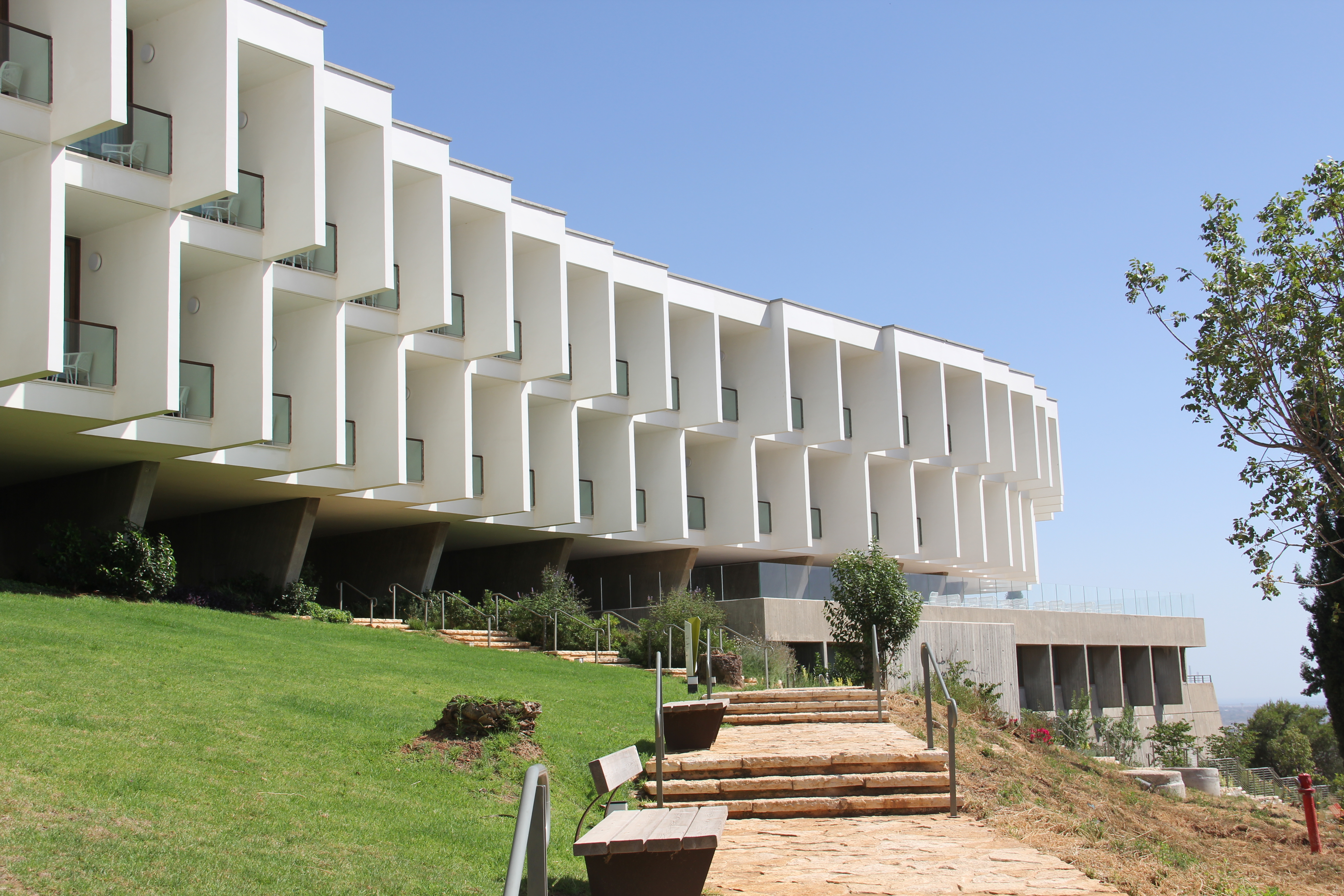

- Location within Haifa region of Israel

General information
- Location: Zikhron Ya'akov; Israel
- Coordinates: 32.57820°N 34.94528°E

Technical details
- Floor area: 7,750 sq meters

Design and construction
- Awards: Israel Award

Mivtachim Sanitarium or Worker's Convalescent Home (Hebrew: בית ההבראה של "מבטחים") is a Brutalist building in Zikhron Ya'akov, Israel designed by Israeli architect Yaakov Rechter in 1966.

== History ==
=== Early history ===
The Mivtachim Sanitarium was originally designed for the Israeli labor union Histadrut to serve as a retreat center for Israeli workers. The organization conceived of the center as a place where public-sector workers could rest and recuperate.

Mivtachim, a pension fund company associated with Histadrut, commissioned Israeli modernist architect Yaakov Rechter to design the building in the mid 1960s. Construction began on the project in 1966 was completed in 1969.

Rechter was widely recognized for his work on the project, receiving the Israel Prize in Architecture in 1973 for his projects including this building.

=== Later functions ===
The building's operations changed hands among a number of companies throughout the 1980s and 90s. As Eilat and Tiberias grew in popularity as vacation destinations, the hotel saw decreasing use.

In 2005, the building was placed on the market, and ultimately purchased by Lili Elstein. Despite originally expressing the intention to preserve the building, Elstein moved to demolish parts of the structure with the goal of expanding the structure's size sixfold. In 2009, following criticism from local residents and architectural preservationists, Elstein settled on a less extensive plan not entailing any additions to the original building. For her renovation of the building Elstein hired Amnon Rechter, son of Yaakov Rechter, and hotel architect Rani Ziss. Following the completion of renovations in 2015, the hotel reopened as the ELMA Hotel.

== Gallery ==
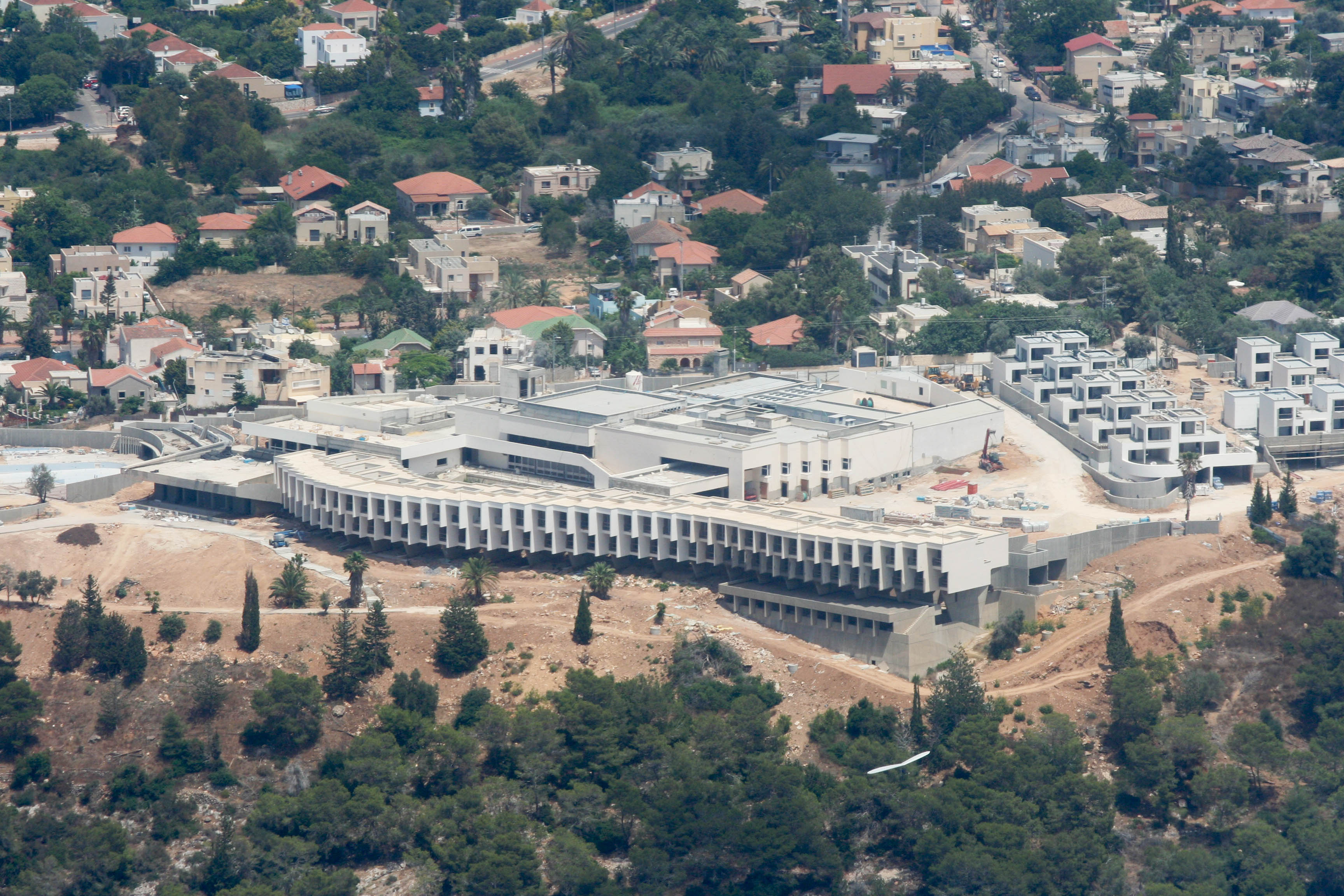
Aerial view

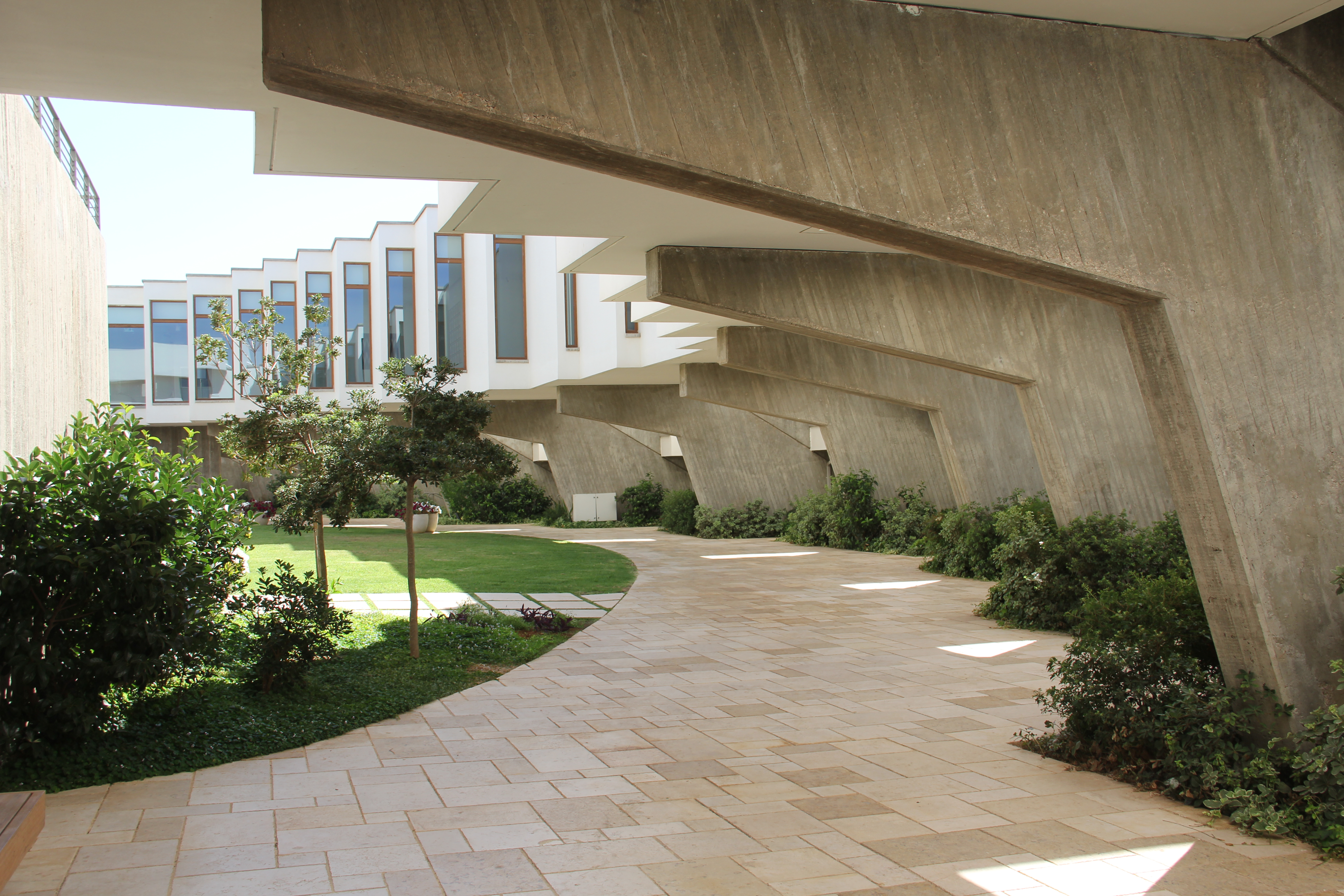
Walkway in Elma Hotel

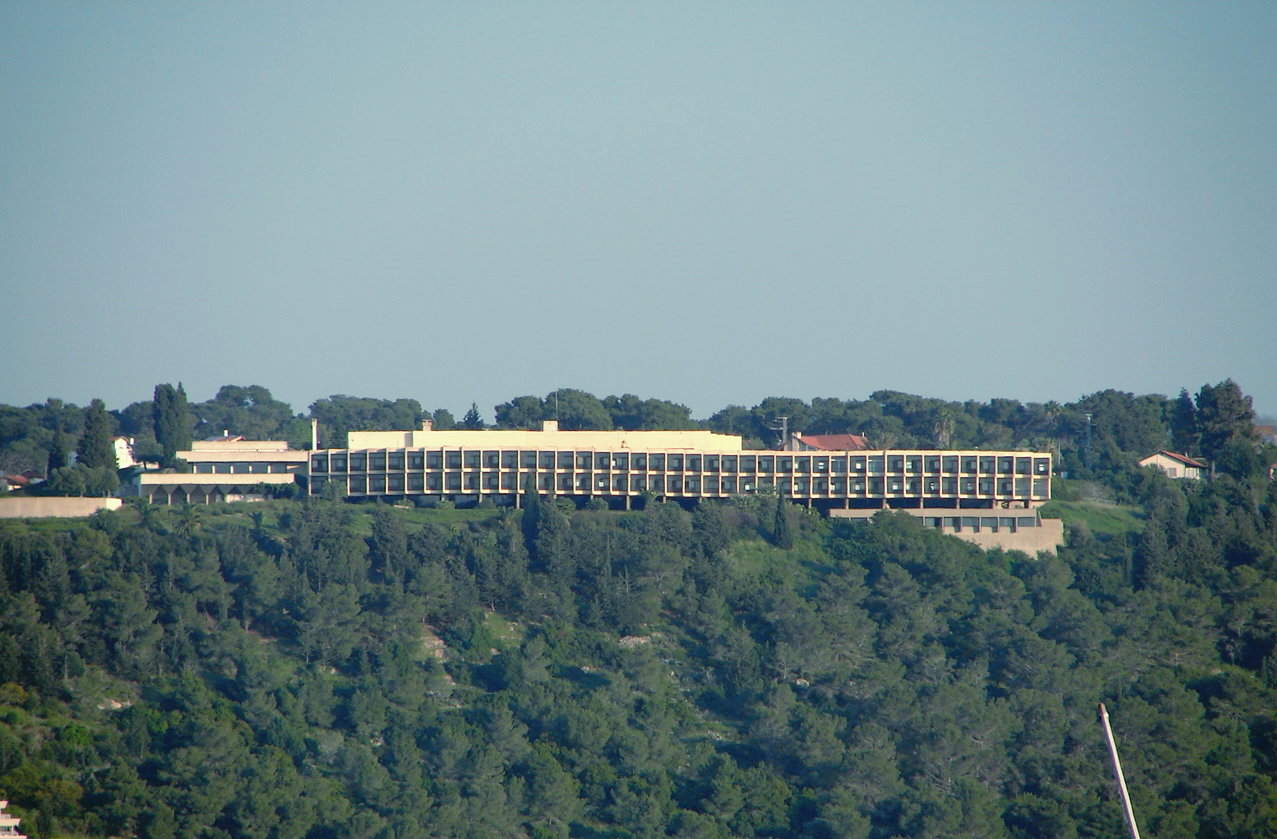
Exterior view
