= Inbal Jerusalem Hotel =

Hotel in Jerusalem

Inbal Jerusalem Hotel מלון ענבל
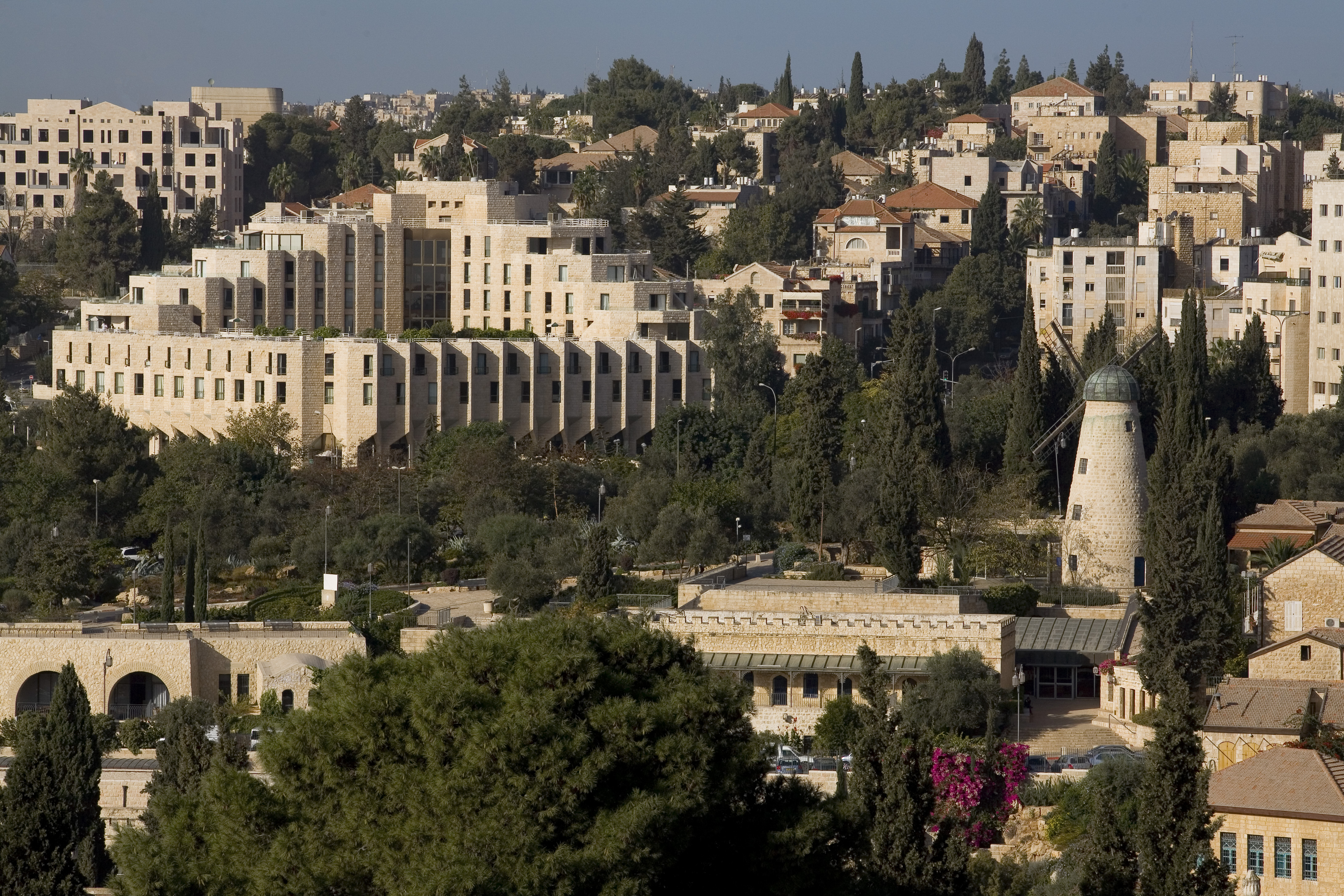
- View of Inbal Jerusalem
- Interactive map of the Inbal Jerusalem Hotel מלון ענבל area

General information
- Location: 3 Jabotinsky St. 92145 Jerusalem
- Coordinates: 31.550453°N 35.046387°E
- Opening: 1982

Design and construction
- Architect: Ya'acov Rechter

Other information
- Number of rooms: 335
- Number of restaurants: 3

Website
- https://www.inbalhotel.com/

The Inbal Jerusalem Hotel (Hebrew: מלון ענבל) is a luxury 5-star hotel in the Talbiya neighborhood of Jerusalem.

== History ==
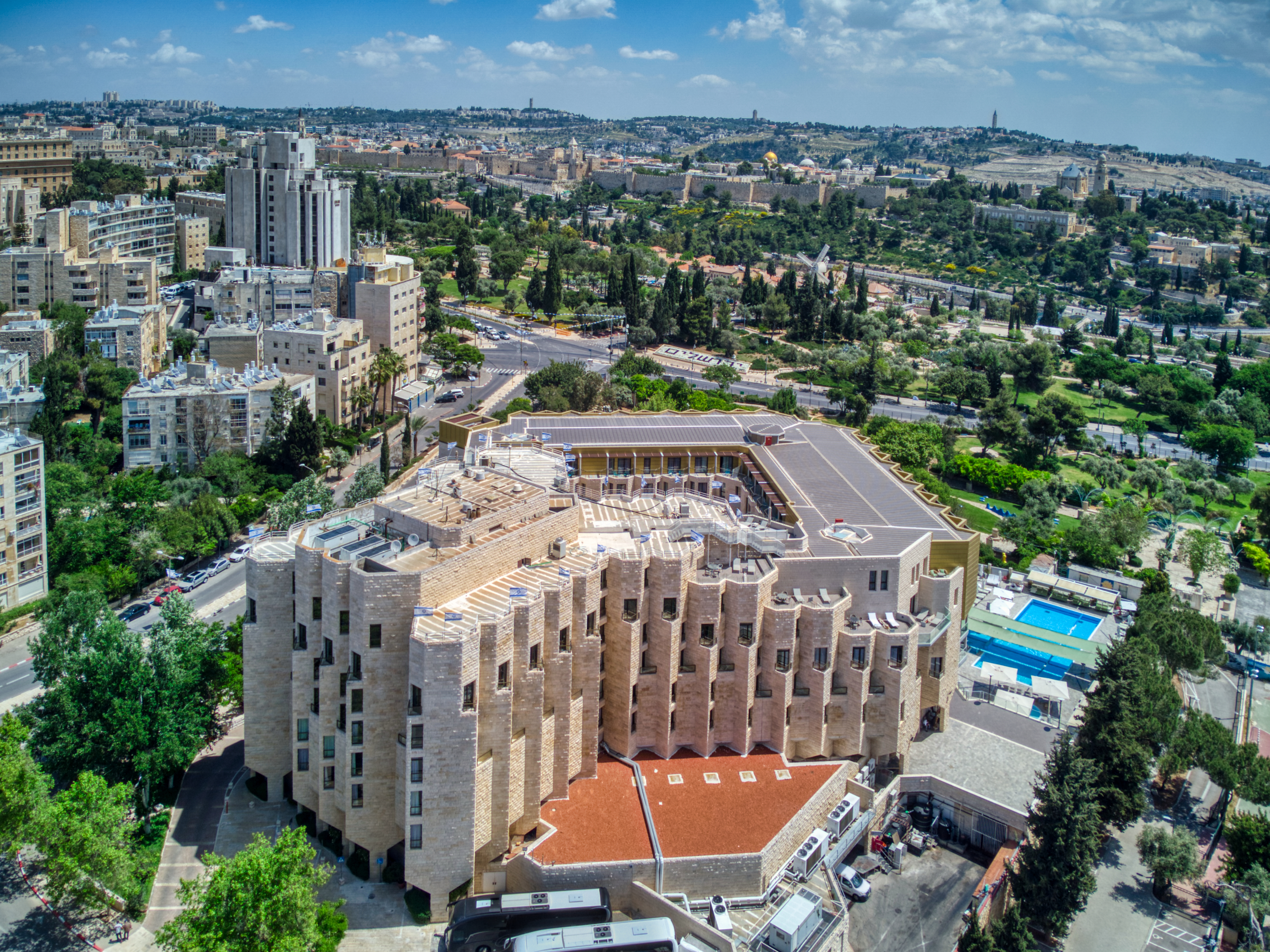
The hotel and the Old City of Jerusalem

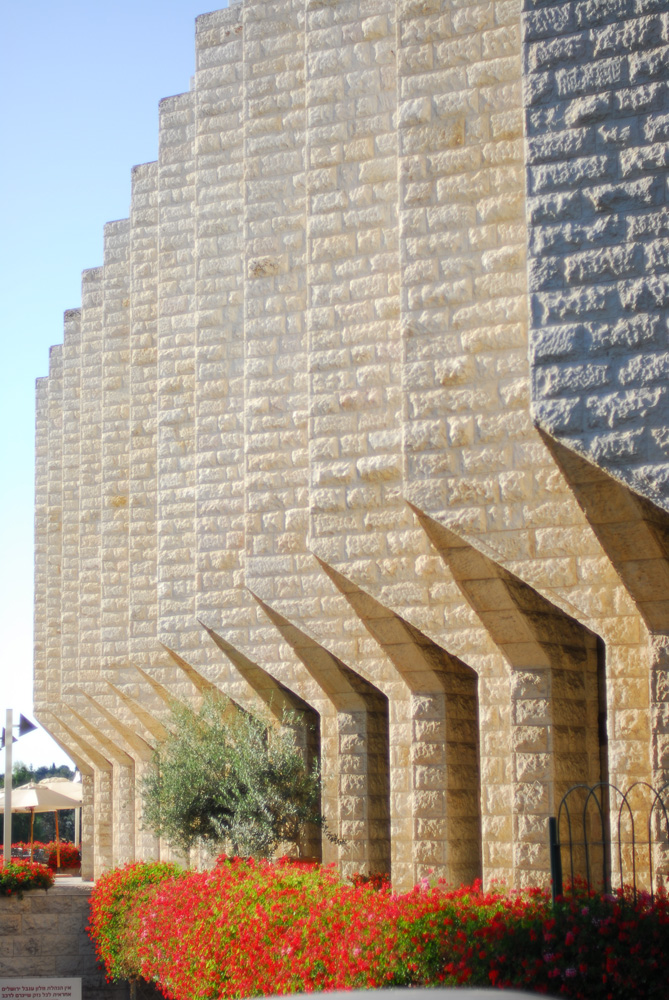
Hotel facade faced in Jerusalem stone

Originally known as the Laromme, the hotel was designed by architect Yaakov Rechter. It opened in 1982 on a tract of land adjacent to Liberty Bell Park owned by one of the churches in Jerusalem and leased by the Jerusalem Municipality. The original plan was to build a 20-story hotel, but neighborhood protests led to a low-rise design.

== Notable guests ==
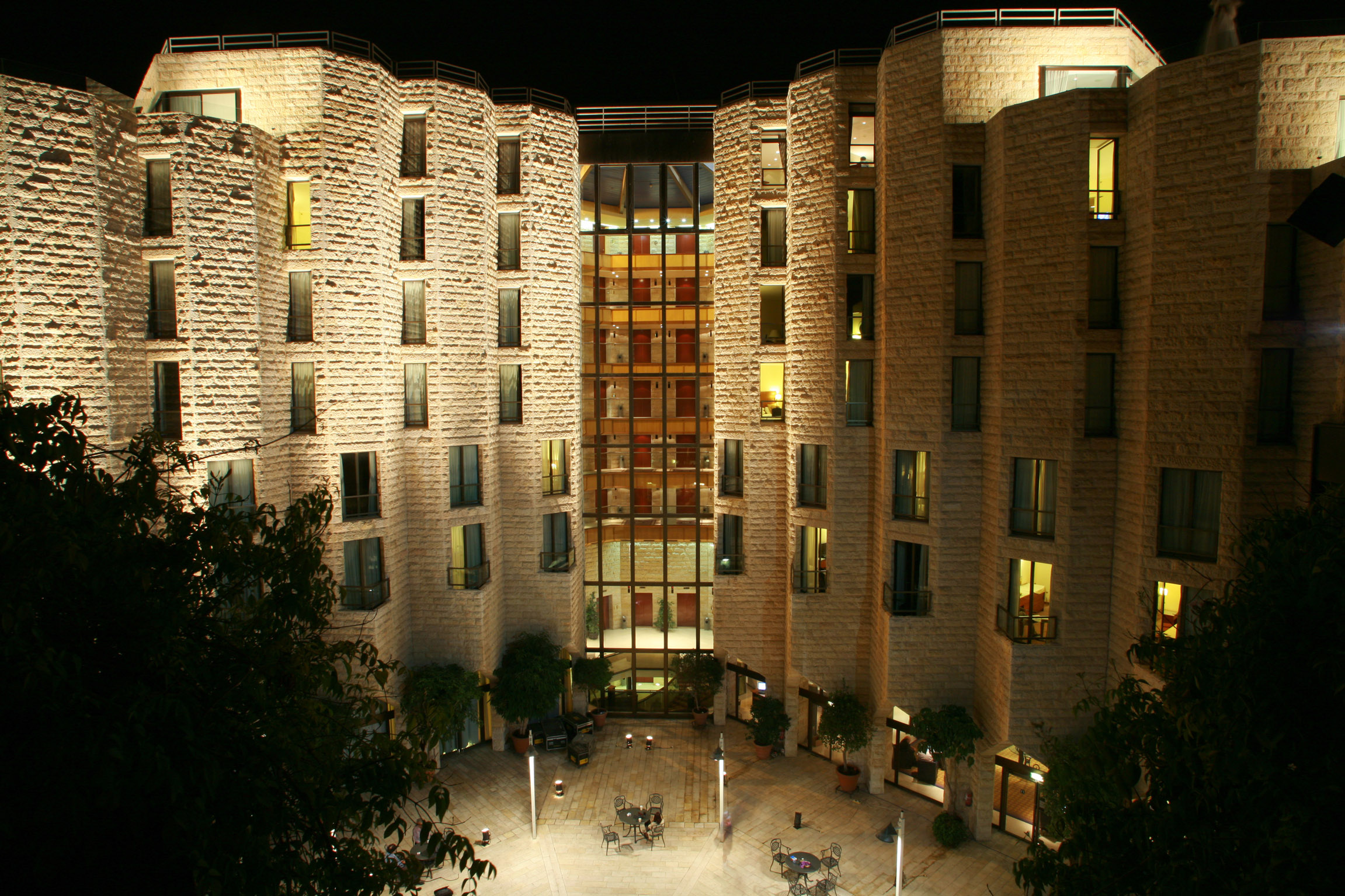
Inbal Courtyard

Notable guests have included Bill Clinton, Al Gore, Henry Kissinger, George Mitchell, Condoleezza Rice, Mikhail Gorbachev, Madeleine Albright and Dennis B. Ross.

== See also ==
- Architecture of Israel
