= Atarim Square =

Square in Tel Aviv, Israel

Coordinates: 32°05′8″N 34°46′10″E

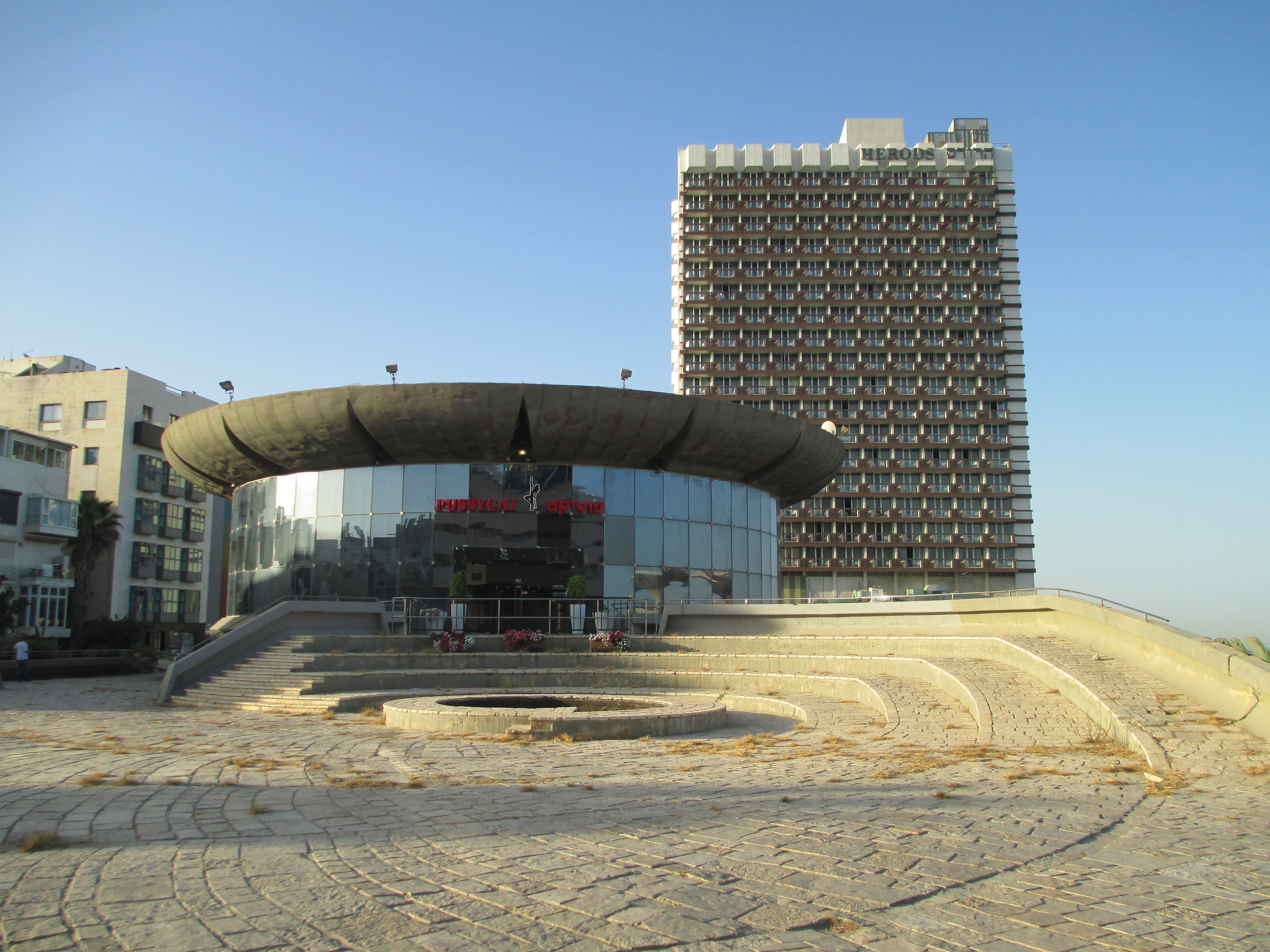
The "Colosseum Club" rotunda

Atarim Square (also Namir Square) is a complex of buildings and a public square in Tel Aviv, Israel, designed by architect Yaakov Rechter.

It is an example of Brutalist architecture in Israel. The complex is located near the beach in Tel Aviv over Eliezer Peri Street and is connected to the promenade, to Sderot Ben-Gurion and Hayarkon Street. West of the square is the Gordon Pool.

== History ==
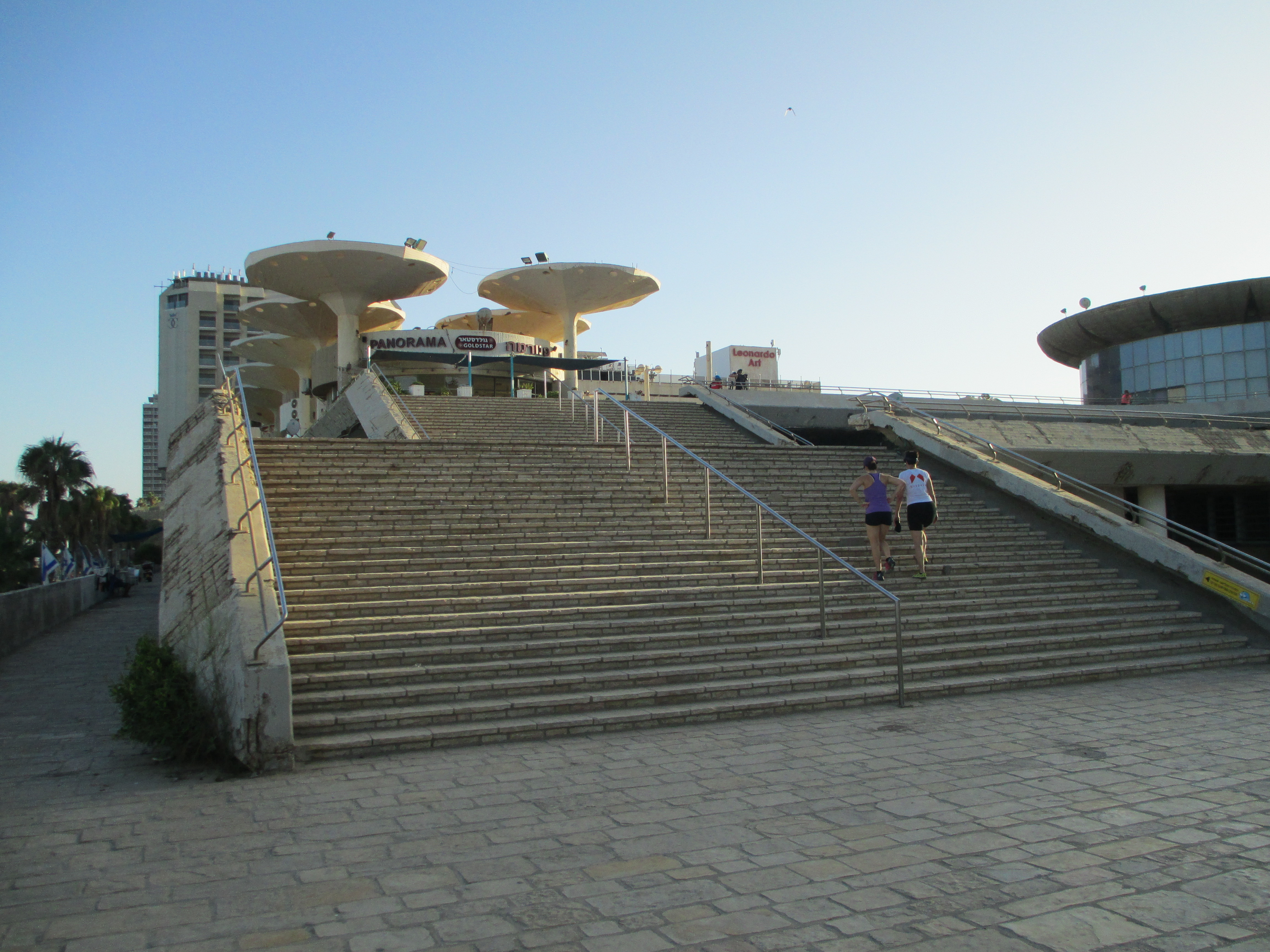
Atarim Square

Before the construction of the square, the neighborhood consisted of shacks and shanties. It was established as a temporary residence to Jewish refugees, forced to flee from Jaffa during the Jaffa riots of 1921 and for new immigrants. The beach neighborhood was subject to frequent winter flooding and high winds.

In the 1950s, evacuation of the neighborhood began. In the 1960s, the Tel Aviv municipality decided to develop the city's northern beaches, and to build modern hotels along the coast. It was decided to develop the square as a tourist center to connect the hotels, beaches and Sderot Ben-Gurion, and planned to include a main road parallel to the shore and parking lot. The center was planned by architect Yaakov Rechter.

Construction began in 1971. The multi-purpose structure was built on a number of levels which exploited the difference in elevations between the cliff where the beach was. The lower level includes a parking lot and gas station. The level above includes a covered highway (Eliezer Peri Street). Two levels above sea level consists of indoor shops and the top level (roof structure) forms a square, including a number of restaurants, an amphitheater and a rotunda coated with glass (formerly known as Colosseum Club). In the northern part of the square lies another building which includes the Marina Hotel and several floors of shops.

The square was inaugurated in June 1975. In the early years the square was lively, with two levels of shops and restaurants. The northern structure established duty-free stores for tourists. In the late 1970s, criminal elements took over the shops, and the square began to be neglected.

In 1982, the Colosseum nightclub, the largest club in Israel opened there, and operated until the late 1990s. However, the square continued to decline. During the Gulf War in 1991, Mayor Shlomo Lahat quipped that he hoped a Scud missile would destroy it. Although the square had originally been named Namir Square, named after Mordechai Namir, Namir's widow, Ora Namir, requested that her late husband's name be withdrawn from the square and for him to be honored some other way after the square's decline. The former Haifa Road is now named for Namir. Attempts to renovate the square have not succeeded
