= Yaakov Rechter =

Israeli architect and Israel Prize laureate (1924-2001)

Yaakov Rechter יעקב רכטר
- Born: 14 June 1924; Tel Aviv, Palestine
- Died: 26 February 2001 (aged 76); Shefayim, Israel
- Education: Technion – Israel Institute of Technology
- Occupation: Architect
- Spouse(s): Sara Shafir; Hana Maron
- Parent(s): Paula Singer and Ze'ev Rechter
- Relatives: 5 children: Yoni Rechter, Ophra Rechter, Michal Loit, Dafna Rechter, and Amnon Rechter
- Awards: Rokach Prize, 1965; Israel Prize, 1972; Arie El-Hanani Prize, 1983

Yaakov Rechter (Hebrew: יעקב רכטר; 14 June 1924 – 26 February 2001) was an Israeli architect and an Israel Prize recipient. Rechter was influenced by the works of Charles-Édouard Jeanneret, known as Le Corbusier, and one of several Israeli architects who designed Cubist buildings in Tel Aviv with flat roofs, taking their inspiration from architecture in North Africa.

== Biography ==
Yaakov Rechter was born on 14 June 1924 in Tel Aviv, in Mandatory Palestine. His parents were Paula Singer and the architect Ze'ev Rechter who arrived to Israel onboard the Ruslan along with other cultural pioneers such as painter Yitzhak Frenkel and historian Joseph Klausner. He grew up in his father's house, which was used as a culture center in Tel Aviv.

Rechter enlisted during World War II in the British Army's Royal Air Force. He was a guard stationed at the Stella Maris Base on Mount Carmel at night. He studied architecture during the day at the Technion – Israel Institute of Technology, in Haifa, Palestine, graduating in 1947.

In 1952 he joined his father's office of architects. Rechter was married twice, to elementary school teacher Sara Shafir, then to actress Hana Maron in 1957. He was the father of five children: musician and composer Yoni Rechter, philosopher Ophra Rechter, illustrator Michal Loit, actress and singer Dafna Rechter, and architect Amnon Rechter, with whom he worked, forming Rechter Architects.

He designed the Mivtachim Sanitarium in Zikhron Ya'akov, a brutalist architectural work that was dubbed a "masterpiece" by ArchDaily. Rechter sought to float the rooms in a serpentine manner alongside the hill's crown. The sanitarium was commissioned by the Histadrut, Israel's major labour organization. According to ArchDaily, Rechter's architecture sought to incorporate socialist ideals. After the sanitarium was shut down in the early 2000s it was renovated by Yaakov's son, Amnon Rechter, in 2010 and converted into a hotel.

Rechter is considered by ArchDaily as belonging to the 'second generation' of Israeli architecture. In contrast to the sleek white stucco of the international style of his father and his fellow architects, in his early career Yaakov Rechter designed with a brutalist pallet, exposing the raw concrete surface of his projects. He used concrete heavily, not only because it was cheap at the time but also because in his opinion "[it] is certainly not local, but it's authentic in every sense."

== In popular culture; Monument ==
Rechter was portrayed by Jon Voight in the 2026 historical drama movie Monument. The film also stars Joseph Mazzello as his son Amnon and Aviv Pinkas as his daughter-in-law Osnat, and is directed by Bryan Singer. Set in 1999 in Israel and south Lebanon, the narrative of the true story follows Yaakov and his son tasked by the Israeli government and the South Lebanon Army to build a controversial war memorial honoring fallen Lebanese soldiers. The concept for Monument originated after director Bryan Singer met Amnon Rechter in Israel.

== Notable buildings ==
=== Public buildings ===
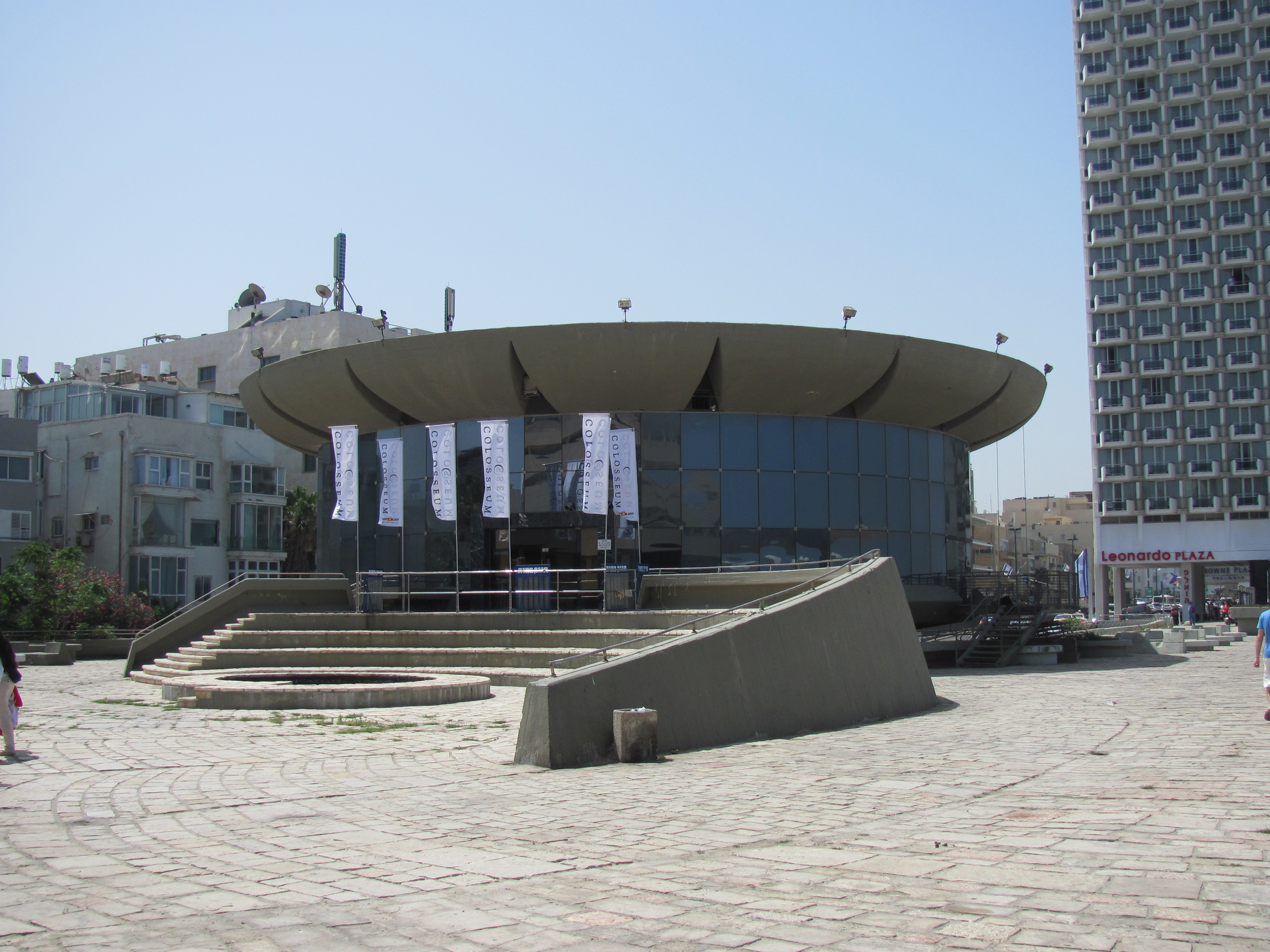
Atarim Square in Tel Aviv, designed by Rechter in 1975

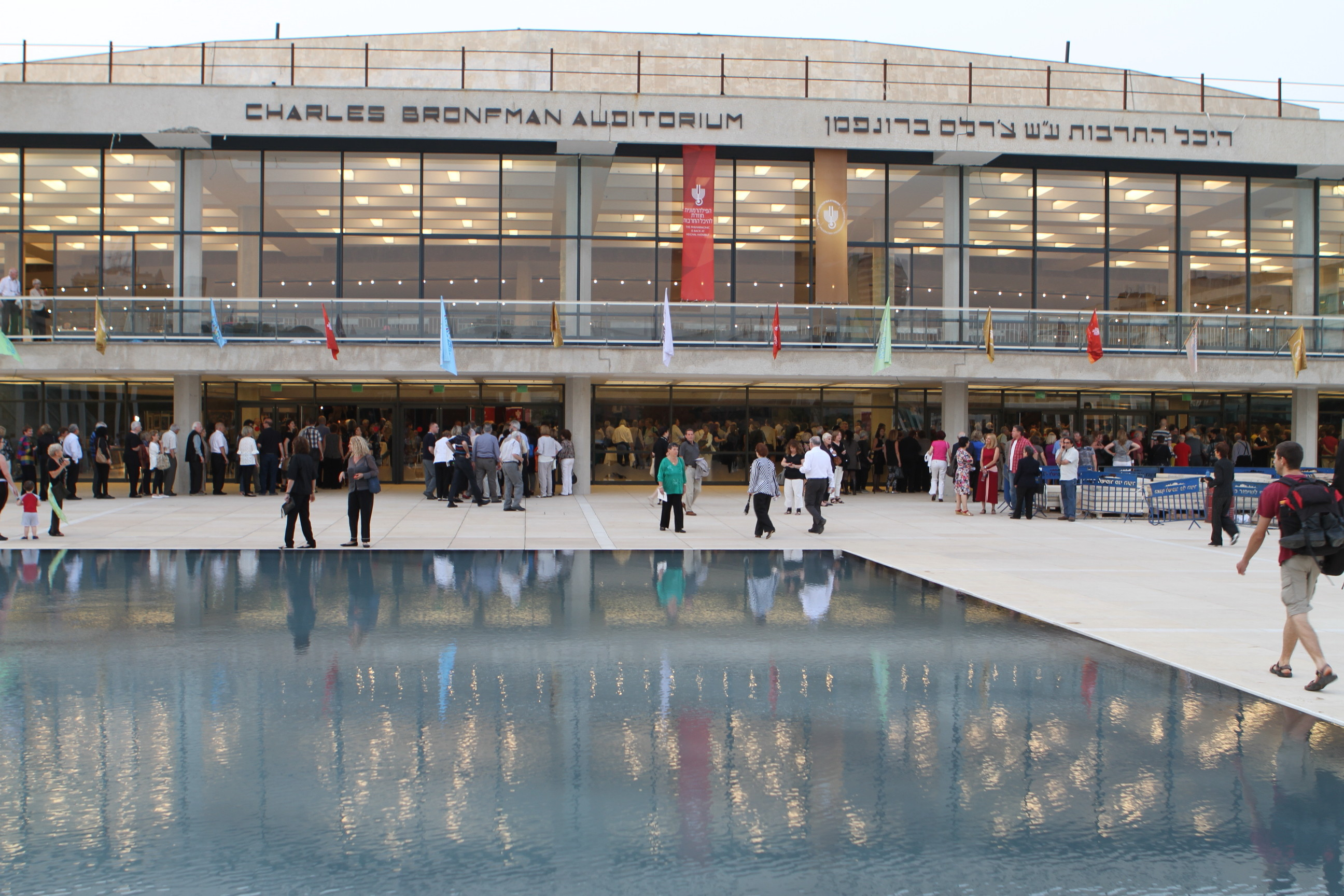
Charles Bronfman Auditorium, Tel Aviv

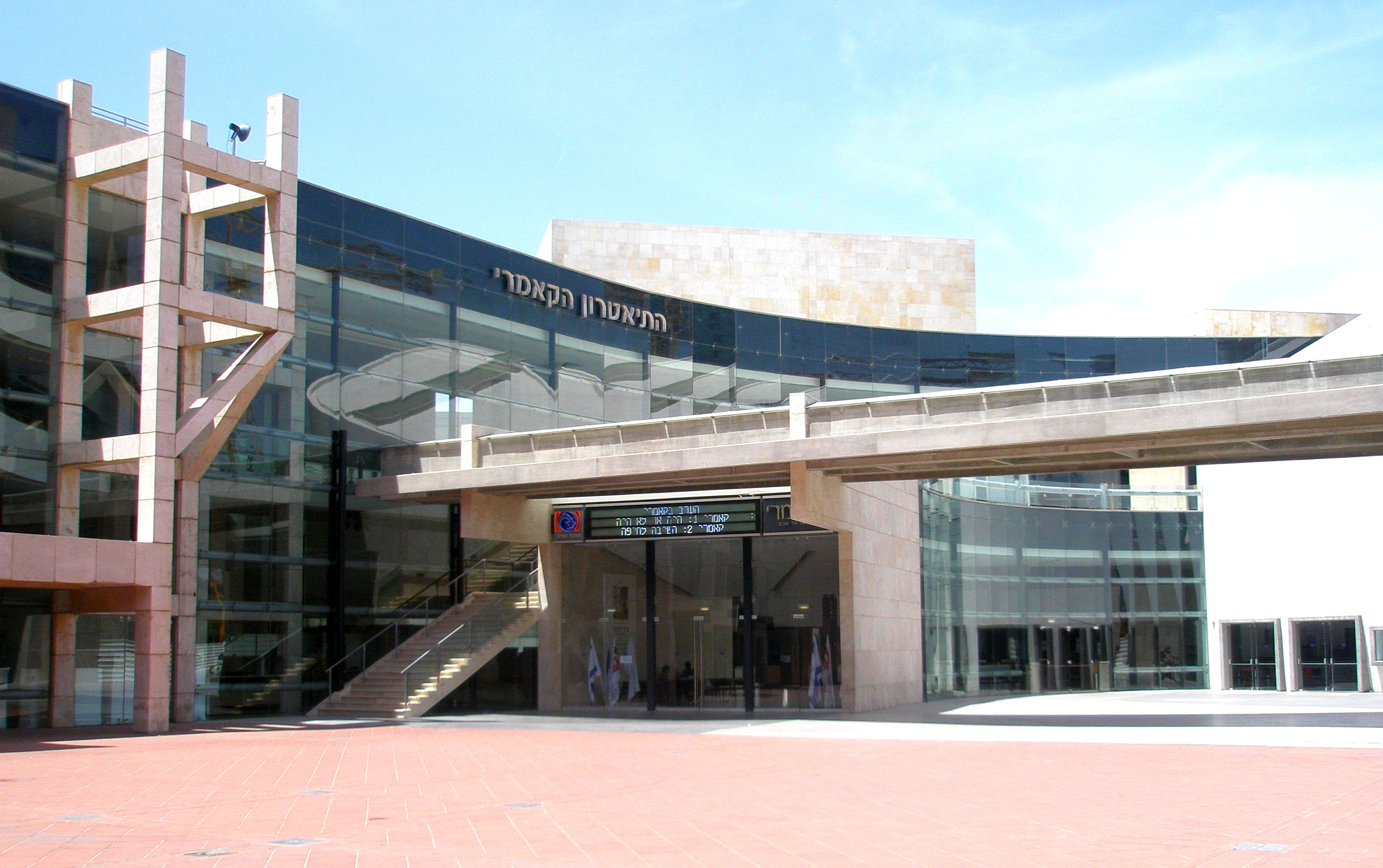
Cameri Theater, Tel Aviv

- Kaplan Medical Center in Rehovot, 1953
- Heichal HaTarbut, officially the Charles Bronfman Auditorium and formerly the Fredric R. Mann Auditorium, Tel Aviv, 1957
- Helena Rubinstein Pavilion for Contemporary Art, Tel Aviv Museum of Art, Tel Aviv, 1952-59 (renovated in 2023 as the Eyal Ofer Pavilion by third-generation Rechter architect, Amnon)
- Herzliya Museum of Contemporary Art, 1975
- Atarim Square, Tel Aviv, 1975
- National Jewish Center for Learning and Leadership, Tel Aviv, 1976
- Carmel Hospital (now Carmel Medical Center, Haifa, 1976
- Central Library, Mount Scopus Campus, Hebrew University of Jerusalem, 1981
- Tel Aviv Performing Arts Center, also known as the Golda Meir Center for the Performing Arts, 1994
- Cameri Theater, Tel Aviv, planned by Yaakov but finished in 2003 after his death by his son Amnon

=== Hotels ===
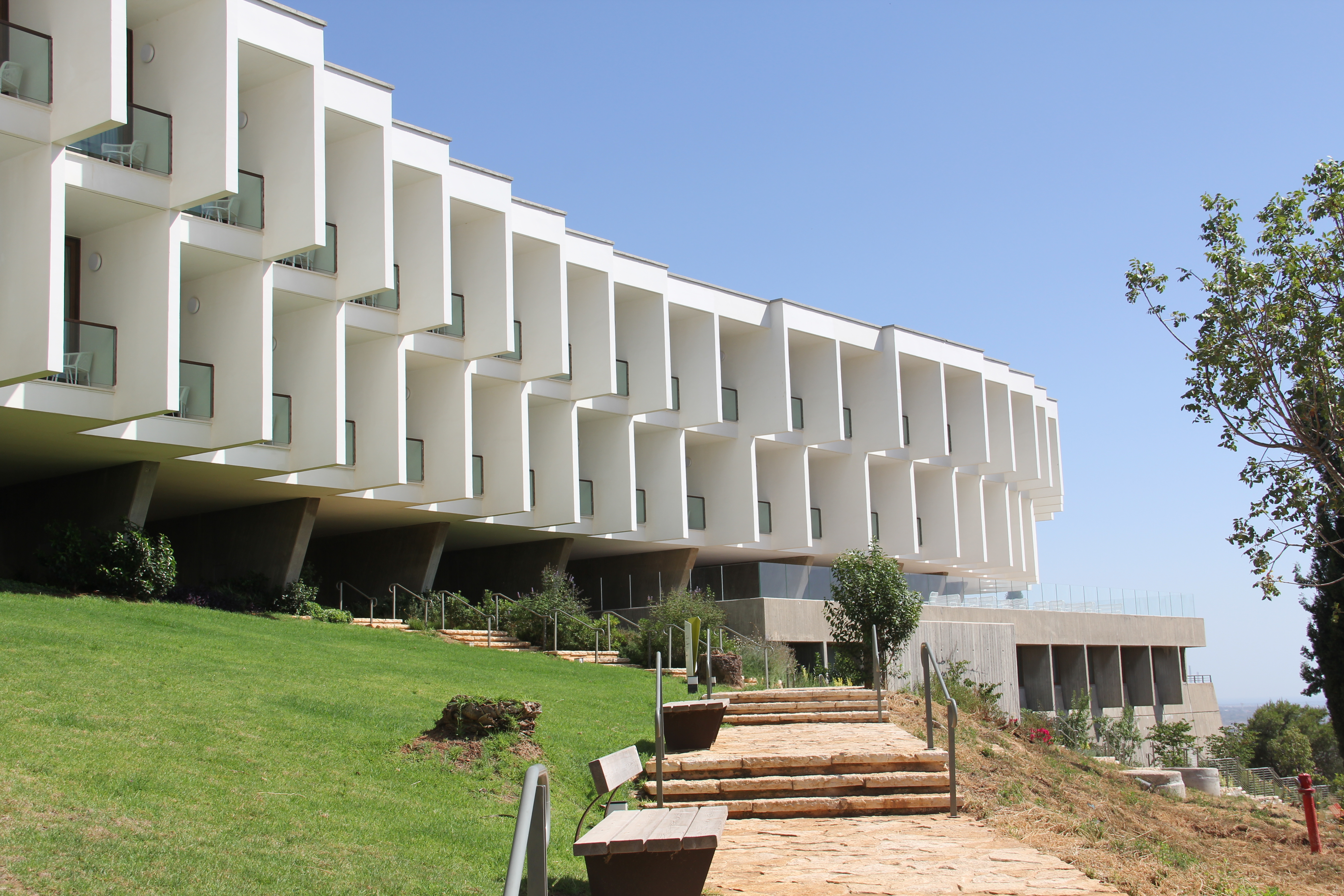
Mivtachim Sanitarium, Zikhron Ya'akov

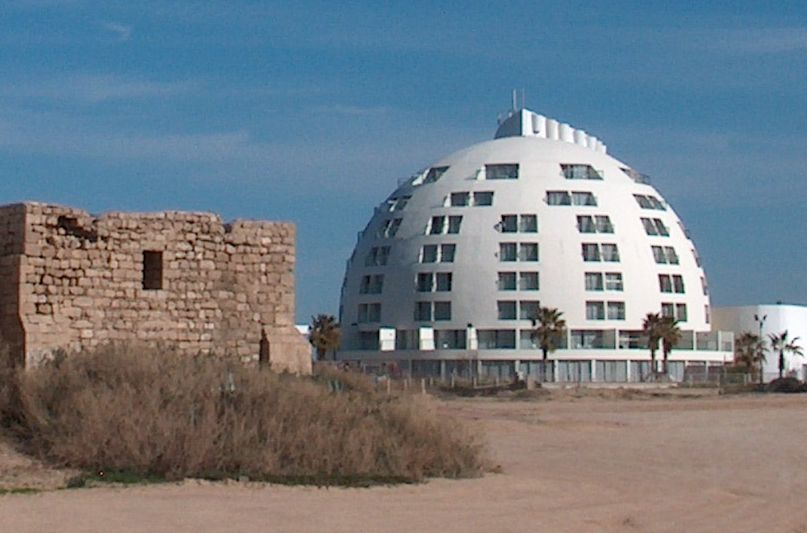
Harlington Hotel in Ashkelon, designed by Rechter in 1998.

- Hasharon, Herzliya Pituach, 1961
- Tel Aviv Hilton, 1965
- Mivtachim Sanitarium, Zikhron Ya'akov, 1966
- Herods Tel Aviv Hotel (formerly Sheraton), 1972
- Jerusalem Hilton (now VERT Jerusalem), Jerusalem, 1974
- Sheraton Tel Aviv Hotel, 1977
- Carlton Tel Aviv, 1980
- King Solomon Sheraton Hotel (now King Solomon Hotel), Jerusalem, 1981
- Laromme Hotel (now Inbal Jerusalem Hotel), Jerusalem, 1982
- Holiday Inn (now Harlington Hotel), Ashkelon, 1998

=== Urban planning ===
- Tel Aviv Promenade (Tayelet), Tel Aviv

== Awards ==
- Rokach Prize – given for "Gan Jacob", 1965.
- Israel Prize of Architecture – given for Rechter's design for the Mivtachim Sanitarium in Zikhron Ya'akov, 1972.
- The Arie El-Hanani Prize, Integration of Art and Architecture – given for the combination of art in construction, 1983.

== See also ==
- List of Israel Prize recipients
- Architecture of Israel
- Dov Karmi (1905–1962), his close collaborator and fellow Israel Prize-winning architect
- David Resnick (1924–2012), contemporary Brazilian-born Israeli modernist architect
