= Mili Avital =

Israeli actress (born 1972)

- מילי אביטל
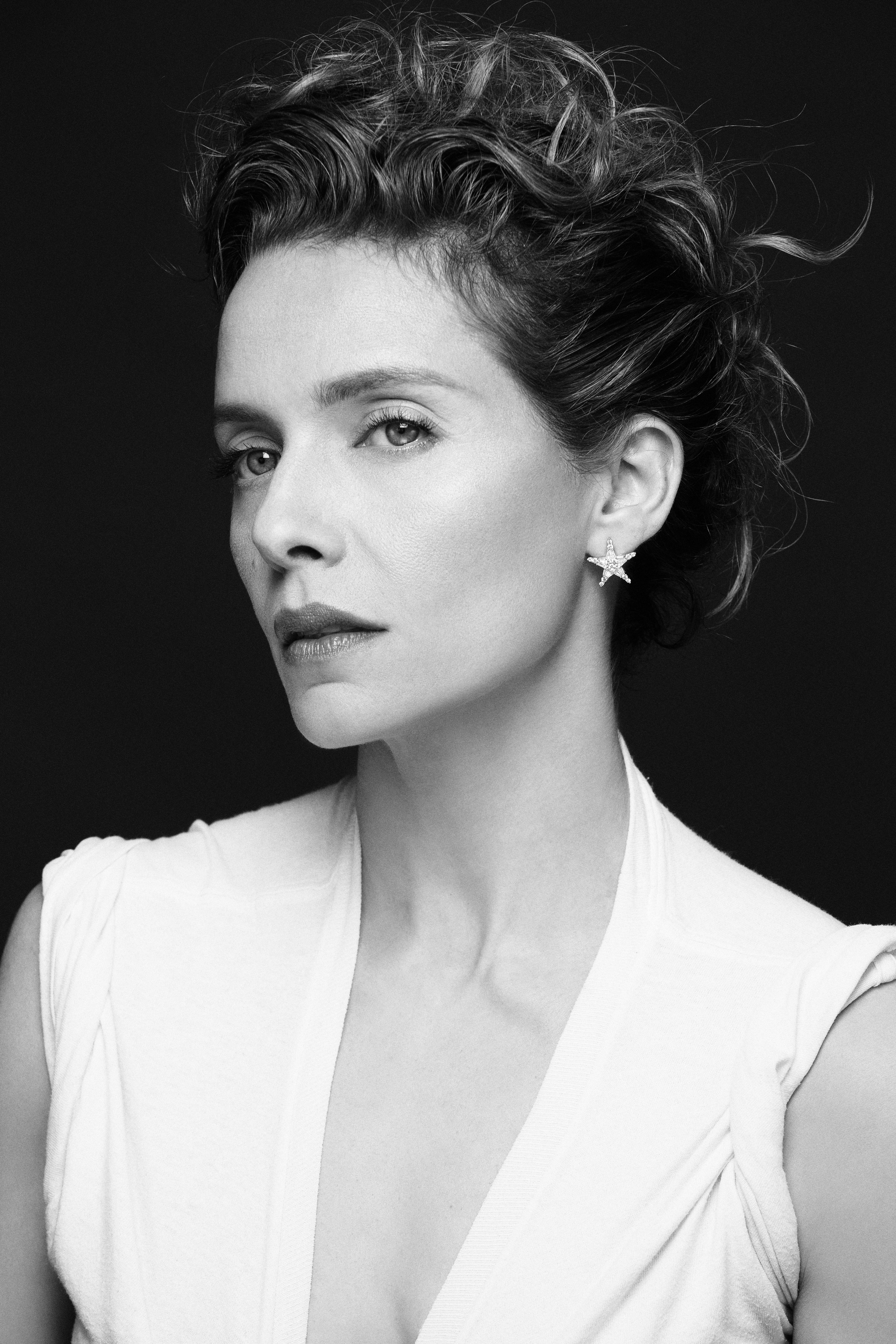
- Avital in 2018
- Born: 30 March 1972 (age 54); Jerusalem, Israel
- Occupation: Actress
- Years active: 1991–present
- Spouse: Charles Randolph (m. 2004)
- Children: 2

Mili Avital (Hebrew: מילי אביטל; born 30 March 1972) is an Israeli actress. Her career began in Israel, starring on stage, film and television. She won the Israeli Academy Award for Best Supporting Actress in 1991, moved to New York in 1993 to study theatre in English, was discovered by an agent while working in a restaurant, and started acting in Hollywood almost immediately. She has maintained her career in both countries since.

== Early life ==
Avital was born in Jerusalem while her parents, Iko and Noni Avital, attended Bezalel Academy of Art and Design. Avital's father was born in Morocco, whereas her mother was born in Egypt and of Turkish-Jewish descent. She was raised in Tel Aviv, Israel, and in Ra'anana, Israel. She attended the Thelma Yellin High School of Arts in Givatayim, Israel, majoring in Theater. During her senior year in High School she starred in Christopher Hampton's Dangerous Liaisons at The Cameri Theater of Tel-Aviv.

== International career ==
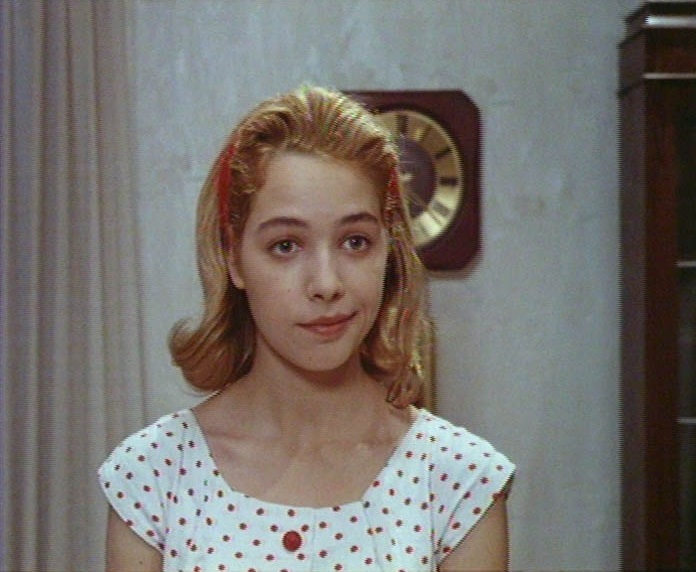
Mili Avital in Jacob Goldwasser's 1991 film Beyond the Sea

In 1993, Avital arrived in New York City to study acting at the Circle in the Square Theatre School. The following year, discovered by an agent while working as a waitress, she was immediately cast as the female lead in the 1994 science fiction film Stargate, for which she received a Sci-fi Universe award. She has appeared in films such as Jim Jarmusch's Dead Man opposite Johnny Depp, Doug Ellin's Kissing a Fool opposite David Schwimmer, Polish Wedding opposite Claire Danes, and Robert Benton's The Human Stain opposite Anthony Hopkins and Nicole Kidman. In 1999, she portrayed a Bosnian rape victim in the pilot episode of the long-running NBC legal drama, Law & Order: Special Victims Unit. Avital appeared in three other episodes of the series: "Parasites", "Manhattan Vigil", and "Depravity Standard". She also appeared in the Law & Order: Criminal Intent episode "Palimpsest". Her television work includes Scheherazade in the Emmy-nominated ABC miniseries Arabian Nights to rave reviews, Jon Avnet's Uprising, and After the Storm . In 2009–2010, Avital appeared in the FX TV show Damages, in a recurring role as the mistress to the husband of Patty Hewes (Glenn Close). She appeared in the 2012 ABC television series 666 Park Avenue.

She starred in the Israeli Cult film "Columbian Love" (2004), and in the Chinese-Israeli story "Noodle", for which she was nominated for the Israeli Academy Award for Best Actress, as well as "Person of the Year" (2008).

Avital has starred in Prisoners of War (aka Hatufim) (2009-2012) which The New York Times listed number one in its "Thirty Best International TV Shows of the Decade" (2019); it was later adapted to series Homeland (Showtime).

As a director, her short documentary film, I Think Myself I Am All the Time Younger, was part of the Tribeca Film Festival in 2004.

Avital directed, co-wrote, co-produced Next Stop - A Comedy of Misconnections, at the Broadway Comedy Club (2017-2018), showing briefly in Los Angeles and Palo-Alto, and in 2024 opening at the Habima National Theater in Israel, the only play to ever perform there in the English language.

In 2023 Avital co-wrote "I Hear You" with Shiri Artzi, which she co-produced with Association of Rape Crisis Centers in Israel, for the Theater for the Youth (Sami Levi's Artzi theater), which won Play of the Year, and Best Writers (2024).

For 2024, Avital has completed "Mary" opposite Anthony Hopkins, which will open on Netflix in December, "Kugel" opposite Sasson Gabai ("The Band's Visit), a spin off of the hit series Shtisel, as well as an Italian film based on Meir Shalev's award-winning novel, are both scheduled for release next year.

== Personal life ==
Avital is married to screenwriter Charles Randolph (The Big Short, Bombshell ); they have two children. They live in both London and New York.

== Filmography ==
=== Film ===
| Year | Title | Role | Notes |
|---|---|---|---|
| 1991 | Me'ever Layam | Miri Goldfarb | |
| 1993 | Groupie | | |
| 1994 | Stargate | Sha'uri | |
| 1995 | Dead Man | Thel Russell | |
| 1996 | Invasion of Privacy | Theresa Barnes | |
| 1997 | The End of Violence | Featured Performer | |
| 1998 | Polish Wedding | Sofie | |
| 1998 | Animals | Fatima | |
| 1998 | Kissing a Fool | Samantha Andrews | |
| 1999 | The Young Girl and the Monsoon | Erin | |
| 1999 | Minotaur | Thea | |
| 2000 | Preston Tylk | Emily Tylk | |
| 2003 | The Human Stain | Young Iris Silk | |
| 2004 | Ahava Colombianit | Tali Shalev | |
| 2005 | When Do We Eat? | Vanessa | |
| 2007 | Noodle | Miri Calderone | |
| 2024 | Mary | Mariamne I | |

=== Television ===
| Year | Title | Role | Notes |
|---|---|---|---|
| 1999 | Law & Order: Special Victims Unit | Marta Stevens | Episode: "Payback" |
| 2000 | Arabian Nights | Scheherezade | TV miniseries |
| 2001 | After the Storm | Coquina | TV film |
| 2001 | Law & Order: Special Victims Unit | Ava Parulis / Irina Parulis | Episode: "Parasites" |
| 2001 | Uprising | Deworah Baron | TV film |
| 2002 | Shabatot VeHagim | Noa | Episodes: "El Ha-Ma'ayan", "Air Guitar" |
| 2009–2010 | Damages | Anna Mercado | Episodes: "I Agree, It Wasn't Funny", "London. Of Course" & "The Dog Is Happier Without Her" |
| 2009–2012 | Prisoners of War | Nurit Halevi-Zach | Recurring role (11 episodes) |
| 2010 | Law & Order: Criminal Intent | Lenore Abrigaille | Episode: "Palimpsest" |
| 2012 | 666 Park Avenue | Danielle Tyler | Episode: "Murmurations" |
| 2012, 2015 | Law & Order: Special Victims Unit | Laurie Colfax | Episode: "Manhattan Vigil" & "Depravity Standard" |
| 2017 | Landing on Their Feet | Dana Berger Fine | Leading role |
| 2024 | Kugel | Yidis Shtisel | Series regular |
