= Sampson House =

Coordinates: 51.5075°N 0.1030°W

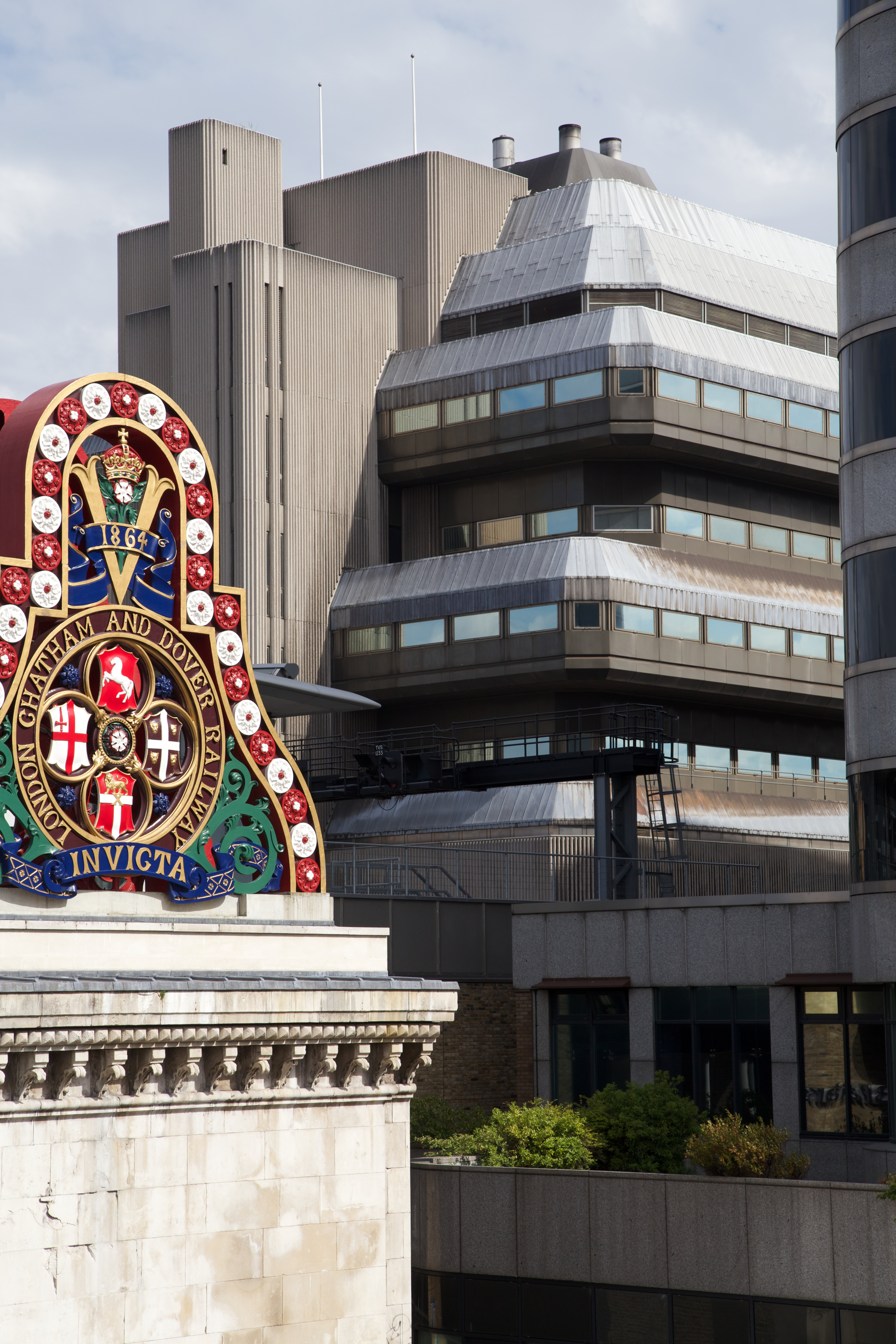
- Sampson House

- Location within Central London

General information
- Architectural style: Brutalist
- Location: adjacent to Blackfriars railway bridge, Hopton Street, Southwark, London, United Kingdom
- Current tenants: IBM
- Construction started: 1976
- Completed: 1979
- Demolished: 2018–2019
- Client: Lloyds Bank

Design and construction
- Architecture firm: Fitzroy Robinson & Partners

Sampson House was a commercial office building in Hopton Street, Southwark, London, United Kingdom. It was sited just west of the Tate Modern art gallery, by the railway lines running onto Blackfriars Bridge and filled a block between the Thames and Southwark Street.

== History ==
The building was designed in the Brutalist style, with heavy massing, extensive use of exposed concrete with minimal glazing at street level and horizontal mirror glazing in dark metal cladding in the projecting upper levels. It was built in 1976–1979 as a processing centre for Lloyds Bank and was designed by Fitzroy Robinson & Partners which was also architect for the construction (and refurbishment in 2004–2006) of 50 Queen Anne's Gate in Westminster.

Minerva plc announced in August 2005 that, in a linked transaction, it had completed the sale of Sampson House for £150.5 million and Ludgate House for £78.5 million to a private investor. The announcement also stated that "Sampson House comprises 386,288 sq.ft. of office space let to IBM UK Limited. The lease expires in December 2025 but, includes a mutual break clause in June 2018. The current rent is £8 million p.a. and will rise to £9.5 million p.a. in December this year". IBM utilised the building's extensive and deep basement levels to host data centres for the company's London based customers, with recovery facilities utilising the above-ground office space.

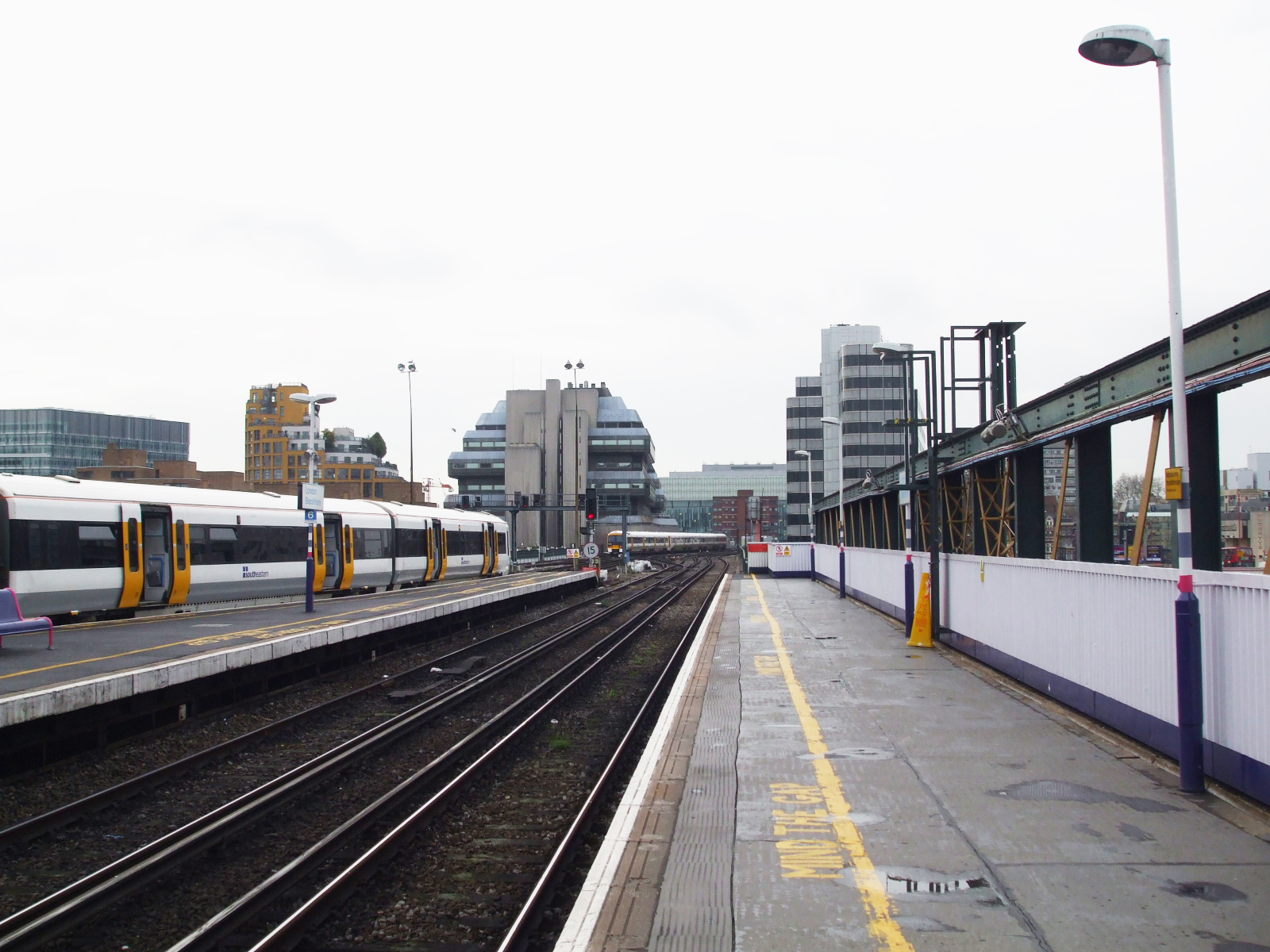
Sampson House as seen from Blackfriars railway station

The nearest Underground station to the site of Sampson House is Southwark on the Jubilee line.

On 8 October 2013, Southwark London Borough Council approved plans to build an apartment building complex, at the Sampson House and Ludgate House sites. The heights of the planned apartment blocks ranges from 5 to 49 storeys.

The demolition of Sampson House started in late 2018 and took a year to complete.

== See also ==
- List of Brutalist structures
