= Tate Modern =

Modern art gallery in London, England

Coordinates: 51°30′28″N 0°05′58″W

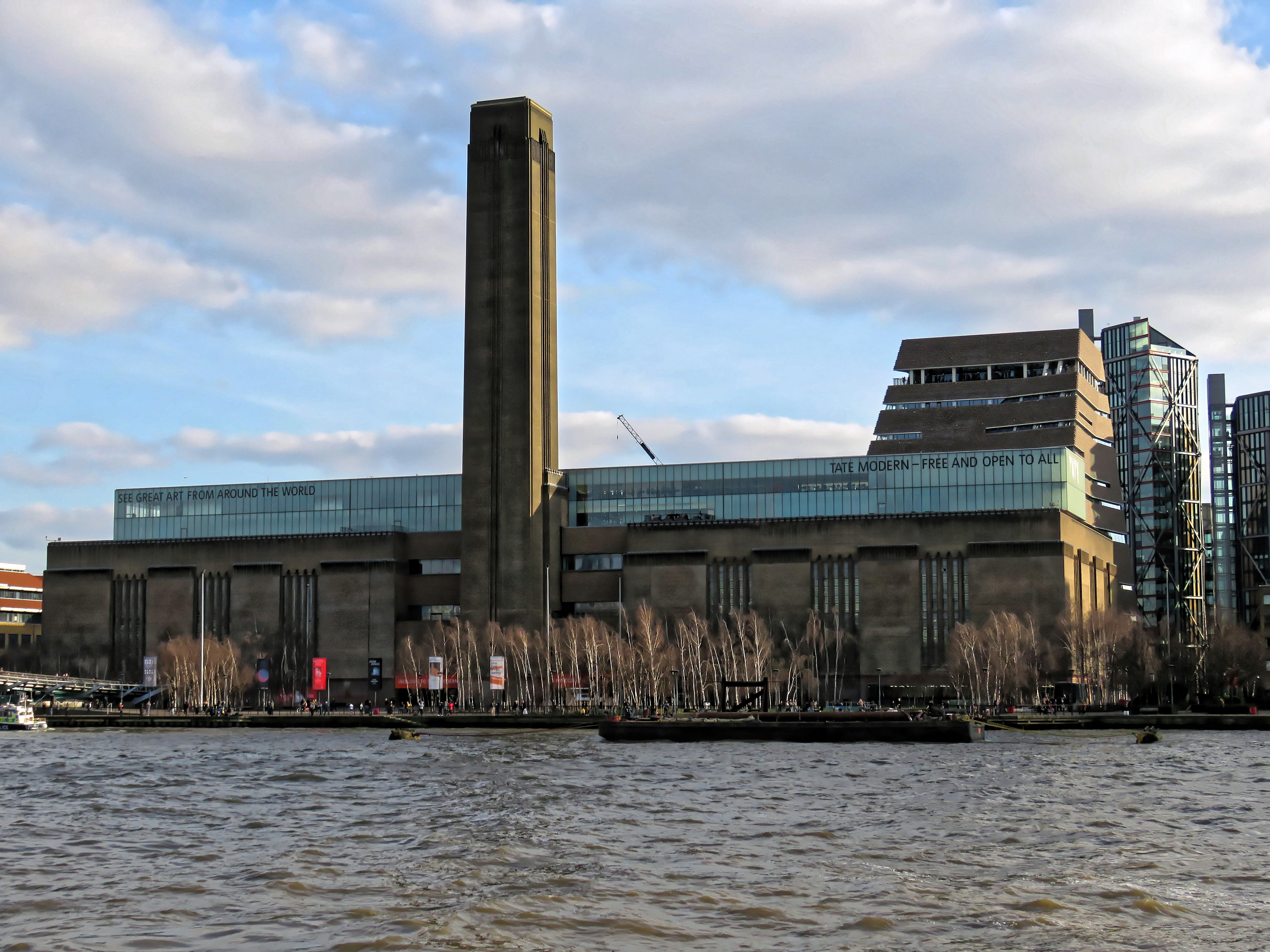
- Tate Modern in 2018

- Location within Central London
- Established: 2000; 26 years ago
- Location: Bankside; London, SE1; United Kingdom
- Visitors: 4,514,266 in 2025
- Director: Karin Hindsbo
- Public transit access: Blackfriars
- Website: tate.org.uk

Tate
- Tate Britain; Tate Liverpool; Tate Modern; Tate St Ives

Tate Modern is an art gallery in London, housing the United Kingdom's national collection of international modern and contemporary art (created from or after 1900). It forms part of the Tate group together with Tate Britain, Tate Liverpool and Tate St Ives. It is located in the former Bankside Power Station, in the Bankside area of the London Borough of Southwark.

Tate Modern is one of the largest museums of modern and contemporary art in the world. As with the UK's other national galleries and museums, there is no admission charge for access to the collection displays, which take up the majority of the gallery space, whereas tickets must be purchased for the major temporary exhibitions.

In 2025, it had 4,514,266 visitors, making it the fourth most popular attraction and the most popular art gallery in the United Kingdom.

The nearest railway and London Underground station is Blackfriars, which is 550 yards (0.5 km) from the gallery.

== History ==
=== Bankside Power Station ===
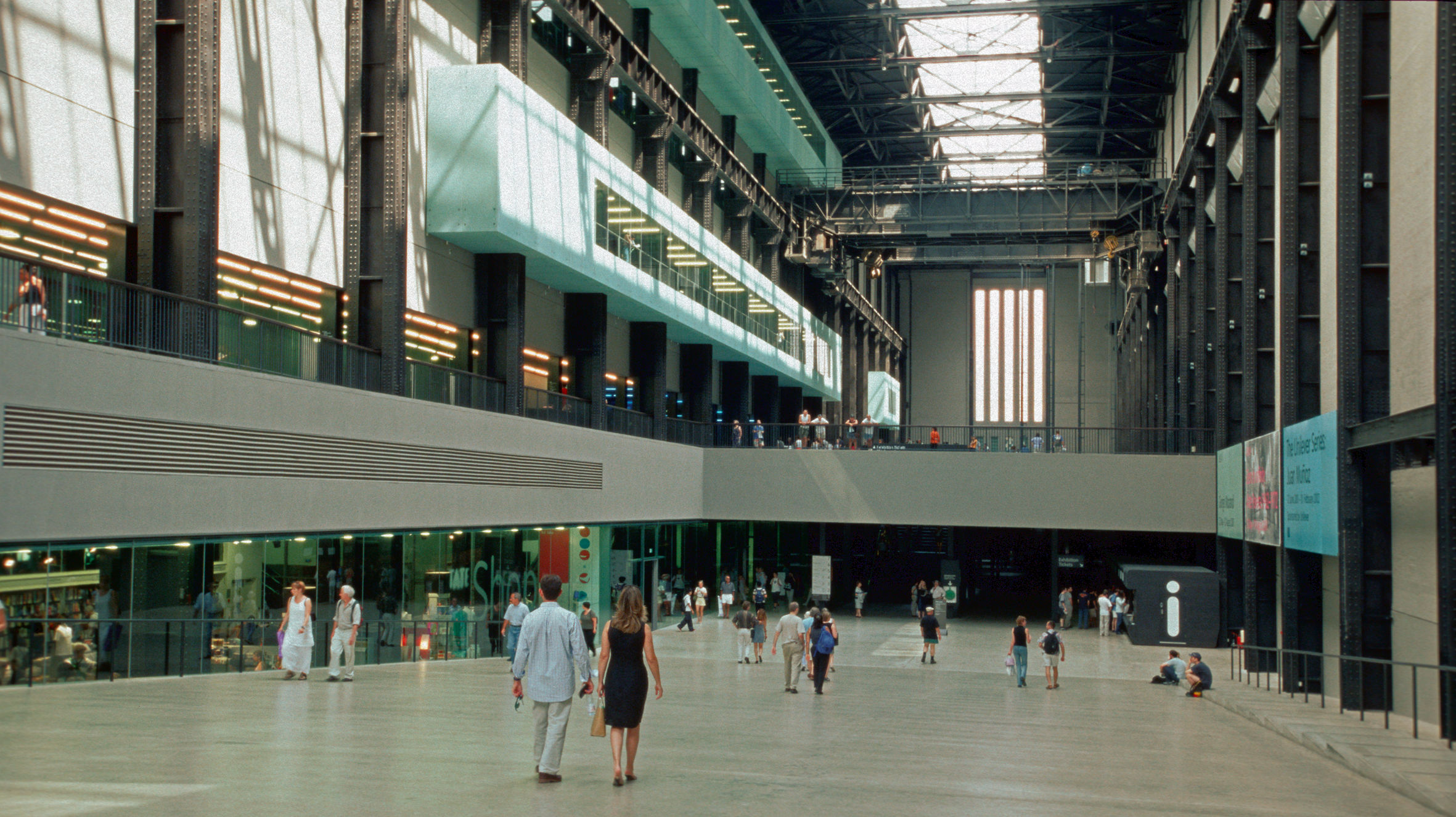
The Turbine Hall

After sharing the Millbank site with Tate Britain for many decades, since 2000 Tate Modern has occupied the converted former Bankside Power Station. This was originally designed by Sir Giles Gilbert Scott, the architect of Battersea Power Station, and built in two stages between 1947 and 1963. It is directly across the river from St Paul's Cathedral. The power station closed in 1981.

Prior to redevelopment, the power station was a 200 m (660 ft) long, steel framed, brick clad building with a substantial central chimney standing 99 m (325 ft). The structure was roughly divided into three main areas each running east–west – the huge main Turbine Hall in the centre, with the boiler house to the north and the switch house to the south.

=== Initial redevelopment ===
For many years after closure Bankside Power Station was at risk of being demolished by developers. Many people campaigned for the building to be saved and put forward suggestions for possible new uses. An application to list the building was refused. In April 1994 the Tate Gallery announced that Bankside would be the home for the new Tate Modern. In July of the same year, an international competition was launched to select an architect for the new gallery. Jacques Herzog and Pierre de Meuron of Herzog & de Meuron were announced as the winning architects in January 1995. The £134 million conversion to the Tate Modern started in June 1995 and was completed in January 2000.

The most obvious external change was the two-story glass extension on one half of the roof. Much of the original internal structure remained, including the cavernous main turbine hall, which retained the overhead travelling crane. An electrical substation, taking up the Switch House in the southern third of the building, remained on-site and owned by the French power company EDF Energy while Tate took over the northern Boiler House for Tate Modern's main exhibition spaces.

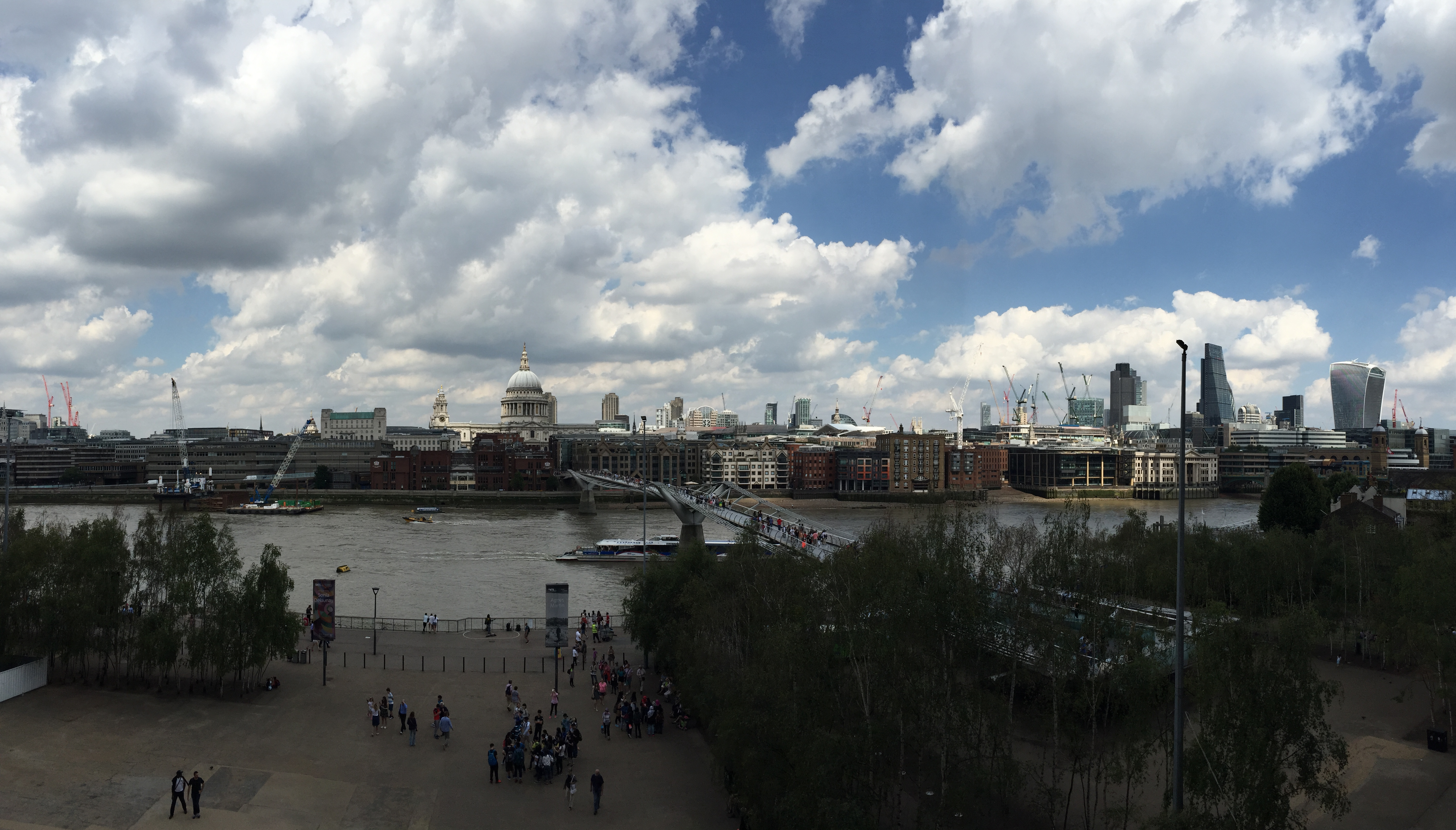
Panoramic view from Tate Modern balcony

The history of the site as well as information about the conversion was the basis for a 2008 documentary Architects Herzog and de Meuron: Alchemy of Building & Tate Modern. The conversion work was carried out by Carillion.

=== Opening and initial reception ===
Tate Modern was opened by the Queen on 11 May 2000.

Tate Modern received 5.25 million visitors in its first year. The previous year the three existing Tate galleries had received 2.5 million visitors combined.

=== Extension project ===
Tate Modern had attracted more visitors than originally expected and plans to expand it had been in preparation since 2004. These plans focused on the south west of the building with the intention of providing 5,000 m^{2} of new display space, almost doubling the amount of display space.

The southern third of the building was retained by the French State owned power company EDF Energy as an electrical substation. In 2006, the company released the western half of this holding and plans were made to replace the structure with a tower extension to the museum, initially planned to be completed in 2015. The tower was to be built over the old oil storage tanks, which would be converted to a performance art space. Structural, geotechnical, civil, and façade engineering and environmental consultancy was undertaken by Ramboll between 2008 and 2016.

This project was initially costed at £215 million. Of the money raised, £50 million came from the UK government; £7 million from the London Development Agency; £6 million from philanthropist John Studzinski; and donations from, among others, the Sultanate of Oman and Elisabeth Murdoch.

In June 2013, international shipping and property magnate Eyal Ofer pledged £10 million to the extension project, making it to 85% of the required funds. Eyal Ofer, chairman of London-based Zodiac Maritime Agencies, said the donation made through his family foundation would enable "an iconic institution to enhance the experience and accessibility of contemporary art". The Tate director, Nicholas Serota, praised the donation saying it would help to make Tate Modern a "truly twenty-first-century museum".

==== The Tanks ====
The first phase of the expansion involved the conversion of three large, circular, underground oil tanks originally used by the power station into accessible display spaces and facilities areas. These opened on 18 July 2012 and closed on 28 October 2012 as work on the tower building continued directly above. They reopened following the completion of the Switch House extension in June 2016.

Two of the Tanks are used to show live performance art and installations while the third provides utility space. Tate describes them as "the world's first museum galleries permanently dedicated to live art".

==== The Switch House ====
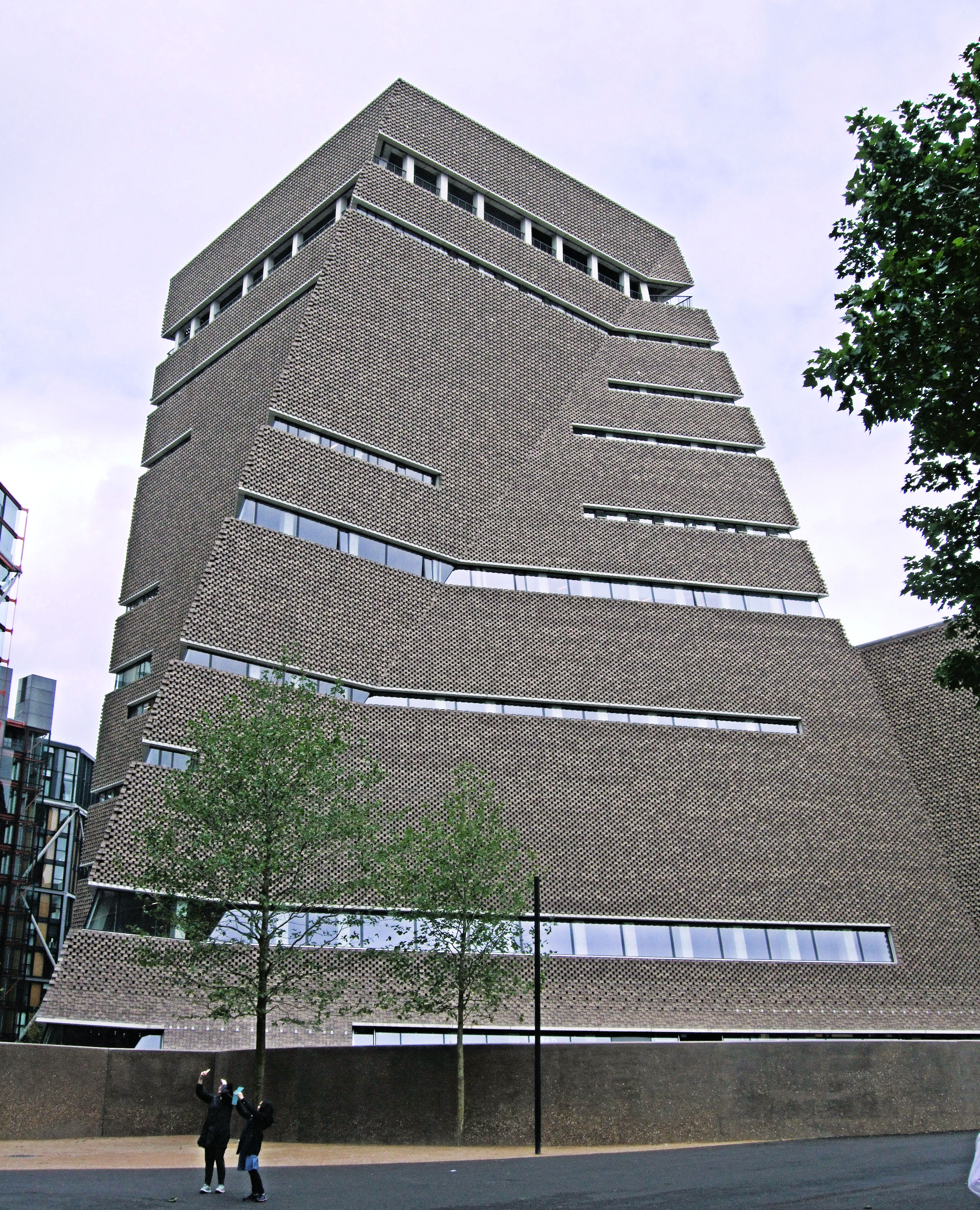
Exterior of the Switch House

A ten-storey tower, 65 m (213 ft) high from ground level, was built above the oil tanks.

The original western half of the Switch House was demolished to make room for the tower and then rebuilt around it with large gallery spaces and access routes between the main building and the new tower on level 1 (ground level) and level 4. The new galleries on level 4 have natural top lighting and are built in a modern style. A bridge built across the turbine hall on level 4 provides an upper access route.

The new building opened to the public on 17 June 2016.

The design, again by Herzog & de Meuron, has been controversial. It was originally designed with a glass stepped pyramid, but this was amended to incorporate a sloping façade in brick latticework (to match the original power-station building) despite planning consent for the original design having been granted.

The extension provides 22,492 m^{2} (242,100 sq ft) of additional gross internal area for display and exhibition spaces, performance spaces, education facilities, offices, catering and retail facilities as well as a car parking and a new external public space.

In May 2017, the Switch House was formally renamed the Blavatnik Building, after Anglo-Ukrainian billionaire Sir Leonard Blavatnik, who contributed a "substantial" amount of the £260 million cost of the extension. Sir Nicholas Serota commented, "Len Blavatnik's enthusiastic support ensured the successful realisation of the project and I am delighted that the new building now bears his name".

== Galleries ==
The collections in Tate Modern consist of works of international modern and contemporary art dating from 1900 until today.

Levels 2, 3 and 4 contain gallery space. Each of those floors is split into a large east and west wing with at least 11 rooms in each. Space between these wings is also used for smaller galleries on levels 2 and 4. The Boiler House shows art from 1900 to the present day.

The Switch House has eleven floors, numbered 0 to 10. Levels 0, 2, 3 and 4 contain gallery space. Level 0 consists of the Tanks, spaces converted from the power station's original fuel oil tanks, while all other levels are housed in the tower extension building constructed above them. The Switch House shows art from 1960 to the present day.

The Turbine Hall is a single large space running the whole length of the building between the Boiler House and the Switch House. At six storeys tall it represents the full height of the original power station building. It is cut by bridges between the Boiler House and the Switch House on levels 1 and 4 but the space is otherwise undivided. The western end consists of a gentle ramp down from the entrance and provides access to both sides on level 0. The eastern end provides a very large space that can be used to show exceptionally large artworks due to its unusual height.

== Exhibitions ==
=== Collection exhibitions ===
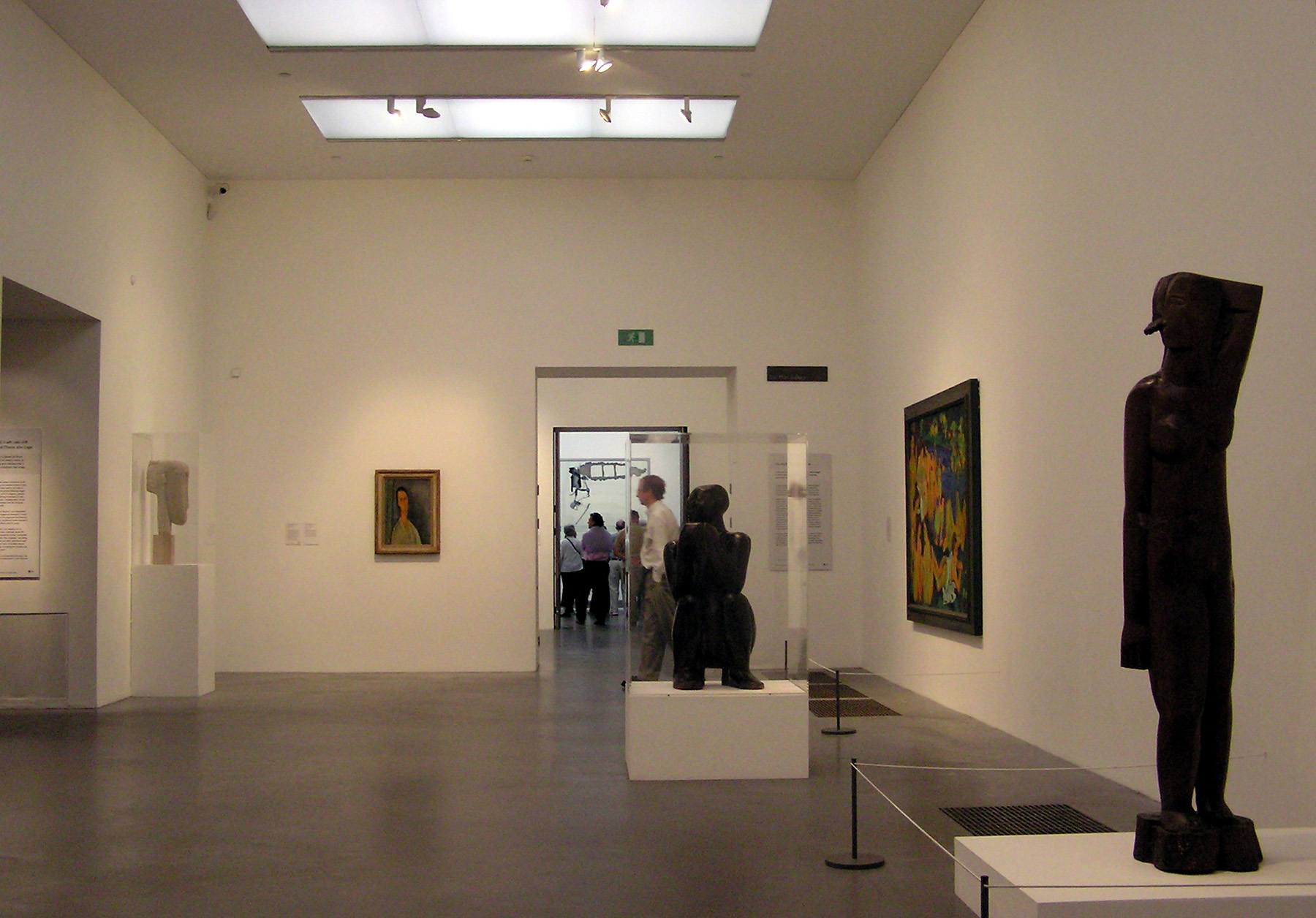
A gallery at Tate Modern

The main collection displays consist of 8 areas with a named theme or subject. Within each area there are some rooms that change periodically showing different works in keeping with the overall theme or subject. The themes are changed less frequently. There is no admission charge for these areas.

As of June 2016 the themed areas were:

- Start Display: A three-room display of works by major artists to introduce the basic ideas of modern art.
- Artist and Society
- In The Studio
- Materials and Objects
- Media Networks
- Between Object and Architecture
- Performer and Participant
- Living Cities

There is also an area dedicated to displaying works from the Artist Rooms collection.

==== History of the collection exhibitions ====
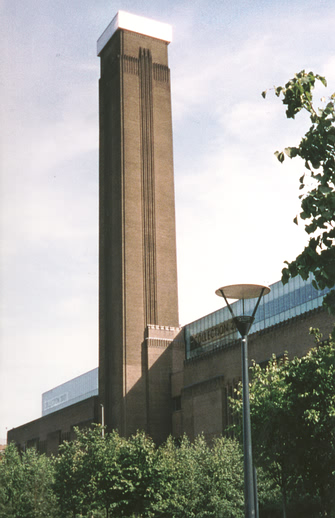
Chimney of Tate Modern. The Swiss Light at its top was designed by Michael Craig-Martin and the architects Herzog & de Meuron and was sponsored by the Swiss government. It was dismantled in May 2008.

Since the Tate Modern first opened in 2000, the collections have not been displayed in chronological order but have been arranged thematically into broad groups. Prior to the opening of the Switch House there were four of these groupings at a time, each allocated a wing on levels 3 and 5 (now levels 2 and 4).

The initial hanging from 2000 to 2006:

- History/Memory/Society
- Nude/Action/Body
- Landscape/Matter/Environment
- Still Life/Object/Real Life

The first rehang at Tate Modern opened in May 2006. It eschewed the thematic groupings in favour of focusing on pivotal moments of twentieth-century art. It also introduced spaces for shorter exhibitions in between the wings. The layout was:

- Material Gestures
- Poetry and Dream
- Energy and Process
- States of Flux

In 2012, there was a partial third rehang. The arrangement was:

- Poetry and Dream
- Structure and Clarity
- Transformed Visions
- Energy and Process
- Setting the Scene – A smaller section, located between wings, covering installations with theatrical or fictional themes.

=== Temporary exhibitions ===
==== The Turbine Hall ====
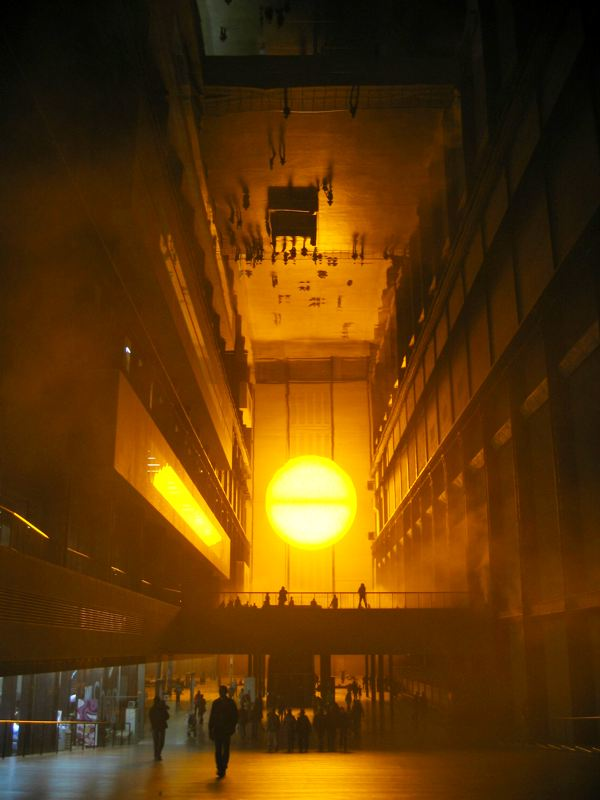
Ólafur Elíasson, The Weather Project (2004)

The Turbine Hall, which once housed the electricity generators of the old power station, is five storeys tall with 3,400 square metres of floorspace. It is used to display large specially-commissioned works by contemporary artists, between October and March each year.

From 2000 until 2012, the series was named after its corporate sponsor, Unilever. In this time the company provided £4.4m sponsorship in total including a renewal deal of £2.2m for a period of five years agreed in 2008. This series was planned to last the gallery's first five years, but the popularity of the series led to its extension until 2012.

The artists who have exhibited commissioned work in the Turbine Hall as part of The Unilever Series are:

Date	Artist	Work(s)	Details
May 2000 – November 2000	Louise Bourgeois	I Do, I Undo, I Redo	About
June 2001 – March 2002	Juan Muñoz	Double Bind	About
October 2002 – April 2003	Anish Kapoor	Marsyas	About
October 2003 – March 2004	Olafur Eliasson	The Weather Project	About
October 2004 – May 2005	Bruce Nauman	Raw Materials	About
October 2005 – May 2006	Rachel Whiteread	EMBANKMENT	About
October 2006 – April 2007	Carsten Höller	Test Site	About
October 2007 – April 2008	Doris Salcedo	Shibboleth	About
October 2008 – April 2009	Dominique Gonzalez-Foerster	TH.2058	About
October 2009 – April 2010	Miroslaw Balka	How It Is	About
October 2010 – April 2011	Ai Weiwei	Sunflower Seeds	About
October 2011 – March 2012	Tacita Dean	Film	About
July 2012 – October 2012	Tino Sehgal	These associations	About

In 2013, Tate Modern signed a sponsorship deal worth around £5 million with Hyundai to cover a ten-year program of commissions, then considered the largest amount of money ever provided to an individual gallery or museum in the United Kingdom. The first commission for the Hyundai series is Mexican artist, Abraham Cruzvillegas.

The artists who have exhibited commissioned work in the Turbine Hall as part of the Hyundai series thus far are:

Date	Artist	Work(s)	Details
13 October 2015 – 3 April 2016	Abraham Cruzvillegas	Empty Lot	About
4 October 2016 – 2 April 2017	Philippe Parreno	ANYWHEN	About
3 October 2017 – 2 April 2018	Superflex	One Two Three Swing!	About
2 October 2018 – 24 February 2019	Tania Bruguera	10,148,451	About
2 October 2019 – 5 April 2020	Kara Walker	Fons Americanus	About
12 October 2021 – 16 January 2022	Anicka Yi	In Love With The World	About
11 October 2022 – 16 April 2023	Cecilia Vicuña	Brain Forest Quipu	About
10 October 2023 – 14 April 2024	El Anatsui	Behind the Red Moon	About
9 October 2024 – 16 March 2025	Mire Lee	Open Wound	About
14 October 2025 – 12 April 2026	Máret Ánne Sara	Goavve-Geabbil	About
13 October 2026 – 11 March 2027	Tarek Atoui	Hold	About

When there is no series running, the Turbine Hall is used for occasional events and exhibitions. In 2011 it was used to display Damien Hirst's For The Love of God. A sell-out show by Kraftwerk in February 2013 crashed the ticket hotline and website, causing a backlash from the band's fans. In 2018 the Turbine Hall was used for two performances of Messiaen's Et exspecto resurrectionem mortuorum and Stockhausen's Gruppen.

==== Major temporary exhibitions ====
Two wings of the Boiler House are used to stage the major temporary exhibitions for which an entry fee is charged. These exhibitions normally run for three or four months. When they were located on a single floor, the two exhibition areas could be combined to host a single exhibition. This was done for the Gilbert and George retrospective due to the size and number of the works.

A 2014 show of Henri Matisse provided Tate Modern with London's best-attended charging exhibition, and with a record 562,622 visitors overall, helped by a nearly five-month-long run. In 2018, Joan Jonas had a retrospective exhibition.

A Year in Art: Australia 1992, featuring contemporary Indigenous Australian art of 1992, which opened in June 2021, was extended until September 2022 owing to its popularity.

In May 2025, Tate Modern celebrated its 25th anniversary with a free four-day "Birthday Weekender". Highlights include the return of Louise Bourgeois’s iconic spider sculpture Maman.

==== The Tanks ====
The Tanks, located on level 0, are three large underground oil tanks, connecting spaces and side rooms originally used by the power station and refurbished for use by the gallery. One tank is used to display installation and video art specially commissioned for the space while smaller areas are used to show installation and video art from the collection. The Tanks have also been used as a venue for live music.

==== Project Space ====
The Project Space (formerly known as the Level 2 Gallery) was a smaller gallery located on the north side of the Boiler House on level 1 which housed exhibitions of contemporary art in collaboration with other international art organisations. Its exhibitions typically ran for 2–3 months and then travelled to the collaborating institution for display there. The space was only accessible by leaving the building and re-entering using a dedicated entrance. It is no longer used as gallery space.

==== Other areas ====
Works are also sometimes shown in the restaurants and members' rooms. Other locations that have been used in the past include the mezzanine on Level 1 and the north facing exterior of the Boiler House building.

== Other facilities ==
In addition to exhibition space there are a number of other facilities:

- A large performance space in one of the tanks on level 0 used to show a changing programme of performance works for which there is sometimes an entrance charge.
- The Starr Auditorium and a seminar room on level 1 which are used to show films and host events for which there is usually an entrance charge.
- The Clore Education Centre, Clore Information Room and McAulay Studios on level 0 which are facilities for use by visiting educational institutions.
- One large and several small shops selling books, prints and merchandise.
- A cafe, an espresso bar, a restaurant and bar and a members' room.
- Tate Modern community garden, co-managed with Bankside Open Spaces Trust

== Access and environs ==
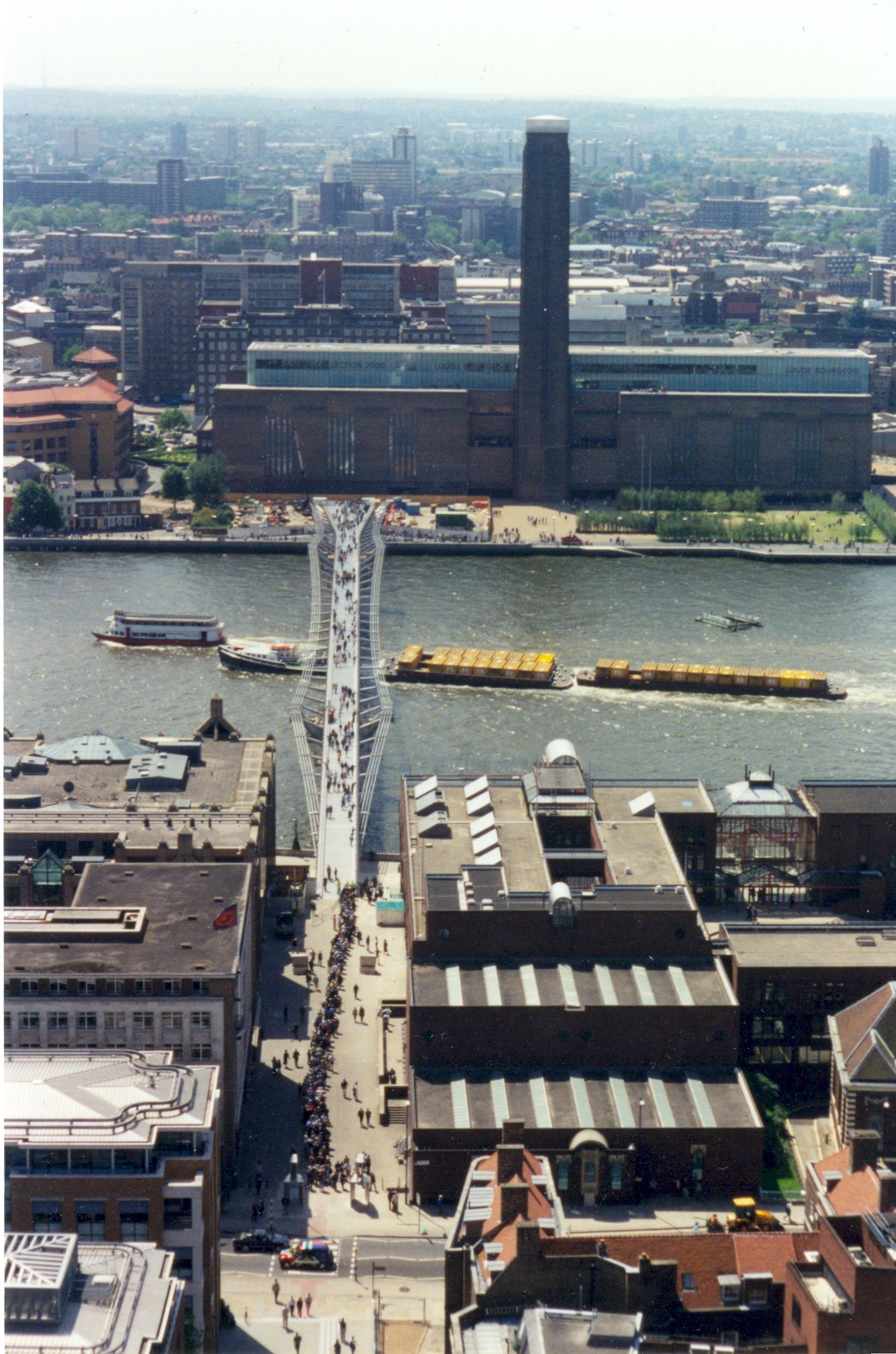
Tate Modern on the opening day of the Millennium Bridge in 2000, viewed from St Paul's Cathedral

The closest mainline station is Blackfriars via its new south entrance. Nearby underground stations include Southwark, as well as St Paul's and Mansion House north of the river which can be reached via the Millennium Bridge. The lampposts along the route between Southwark tube station and Tate Modern are painted orange.

There is also a riverboat pier just outside the gallery called Bankside Pier, with connections to the Docklands and Greenwich via regular passenger boat services (commuter service) and the Tate to Tate service, which connects Tate Modern with Tate Britain.

To the west of Tate Modern is an area currently under redevelopment following the demolitions of Ludgate House, the former headquarters of Express Newspapers and Sampson House, a massive late Brutalist office building.

=== Transport connections ===
Service	Station/Stop	Lines/Routes served	Distance from Tate Modern
London Buses	Blackfriars Bridge	381, N343, N381	0.2-mile walk
London Buses	Blackfriars Bridge / South Side	40, 63, N63, N89	0.2-mile walk
London Buses	Southwark Bridge / Bankside Pier	344	0.4-mile walk
London Underground	Southwark	Jubilee line	0.4-mile walk
National Rail	Blackfriars	Thameslink, Southeastern	0.5-mile walk
National Rail	London Bridge	Thameslink, Southern, Southeastern	0.7-mile walk
London River Services	Bankside Pier	Commuter Service; Tate to Tate; Westminster to St Katharine's Circular	

- At the exit of Southwark tube station, orange lamposts direct visitors to Tate Modern.

== Directors ==
The following have served as Director of the Tate Modern:

- Lars Nittve (1998–2001)
- Vicente Todolí (2003–2010)
- Chris Dercon (2010–2016)
- Frances Morris (2016–2023)
- Karin Hindsbo (2023–Present)

== Protests and stunts ==
Since 2010 there have been a series of protest art performances by the art collective Liberate Tate demanding the Tate to "disengage from BP as a sponsor, and stop allowing Tate to be used to deflect attention away from the devastating impacts that BP has around the world." BP is criticised for operations in relation with petroleum exploration in the Arctic, the Deepwater Horizon oil spill, oil sands and climate change. In June 2015 a group of artists occupied Tate Modern for 25 hours.

In July 2025, conceptual artist Elias Marrow placed a work in the Turbine Hall. The work, titled Load Baring Irony, was in situ for some time before being removed by staff.

== Incidents ==
In 2012 and 2024, two people fell to their deaths from the galleries' balconies. In 2019, a six-year old child from France was thrown off the 10th floor by a teenager with a history of violent conduct. The child survived but sustained life-changing injuries.

== Selections from the permanent collection of paintings ==
Georges Braque, 1909–10, La guitare (Mandora, La Mandore), oil on canvas, 71.1 x 55.9 cm

Pablo Picasso, 1909–10, Figure dans un Fauteuil (Seated Nude, Femme nue assise), oil on canvas, 92.1 x 73 cm. This painting from the collection of Wilhelm Uhde was confiscated by the French state and sold at the Hôtel Drouot in 1921.

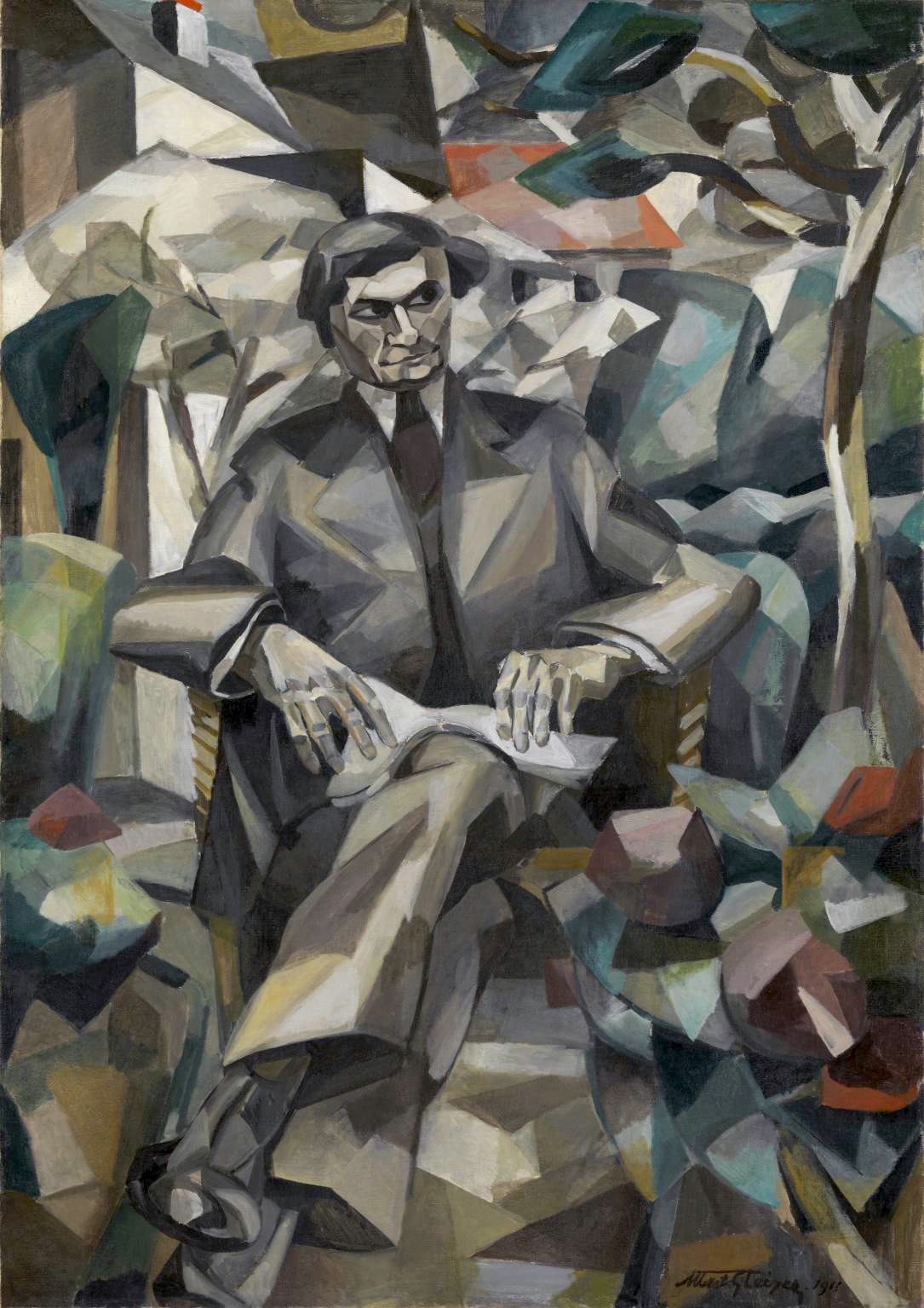
Albert Gleizes, 1911, Portrait de Jacques Nayral, oil on canvas, 161.9 x 114 cm. This painting was reproduced in Fantasio: published 15 October 1911, for the occasion of the Salon d'Automne where it was exhibited the same year.

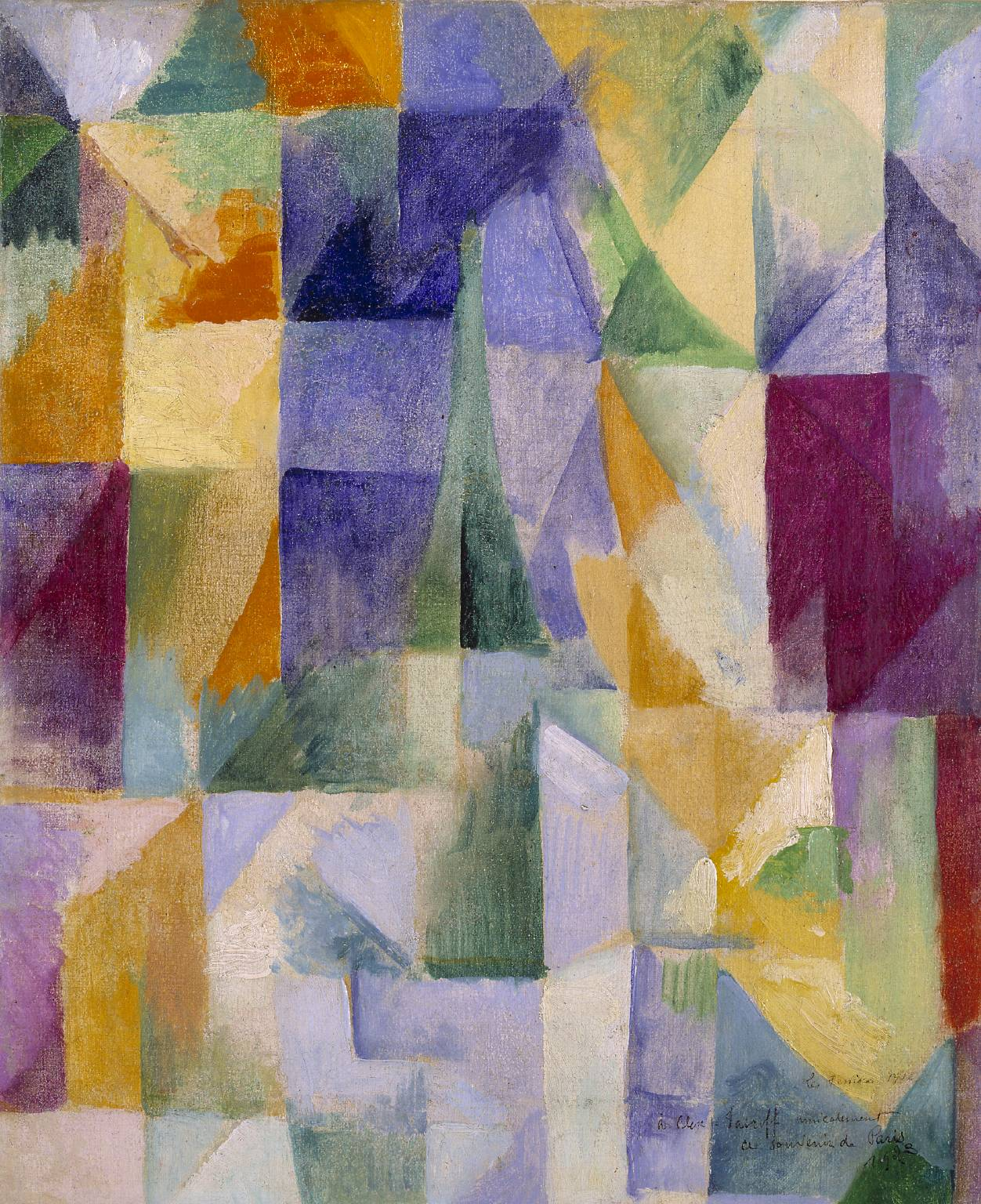
Robert Delaunay, 1912, Windows Open Simultaneously (First Part, Third Motif), oil on canvas, 45.7 x 37.5 cm

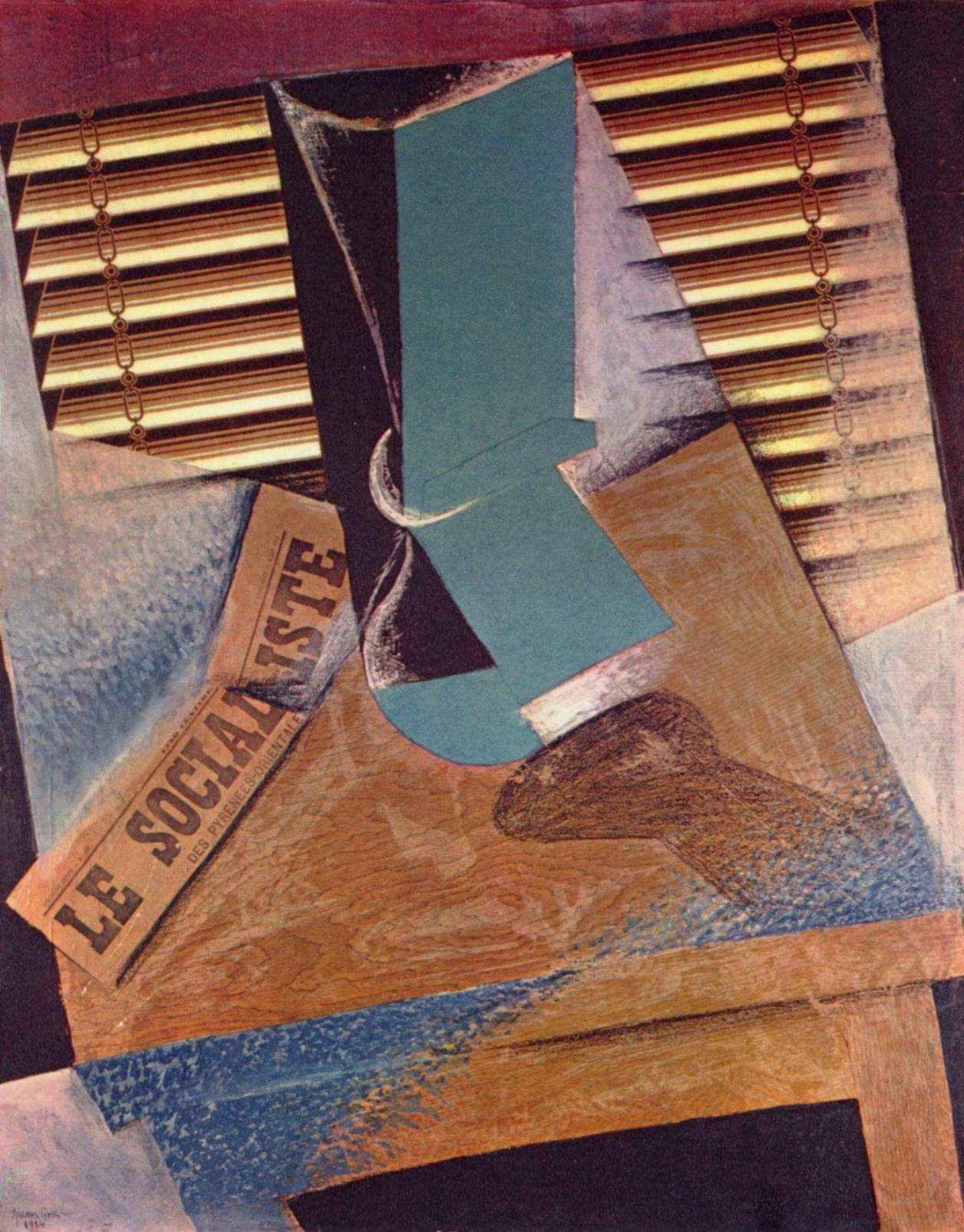
Juan Gris, 1914, The Sunblind, collage and oil on canvas, 92 × 72.5 cm

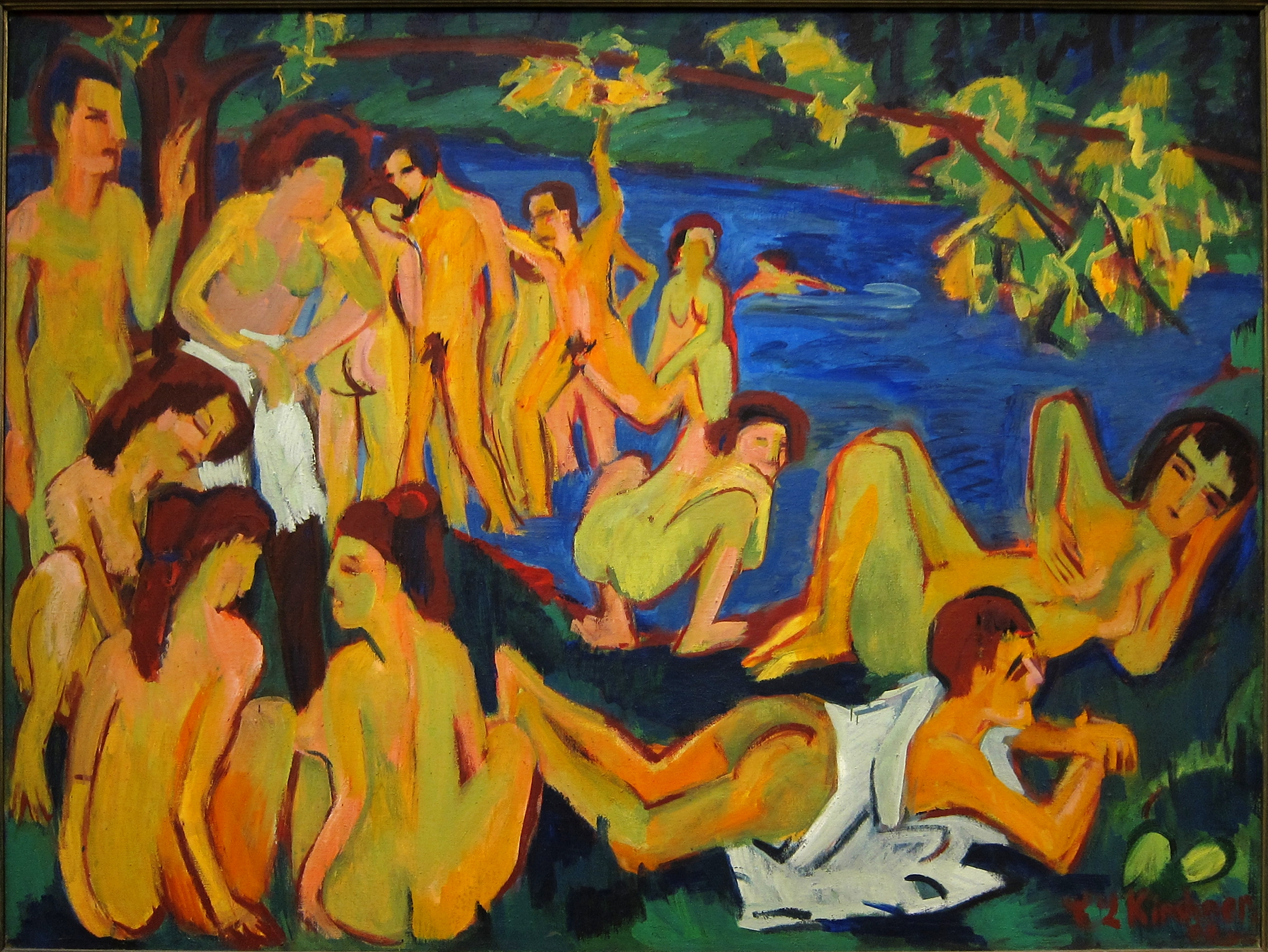
Ernst Ludwig Kirchner, 1909/1926, Badende bei Moritzburg (Bathers at Moritzburg)

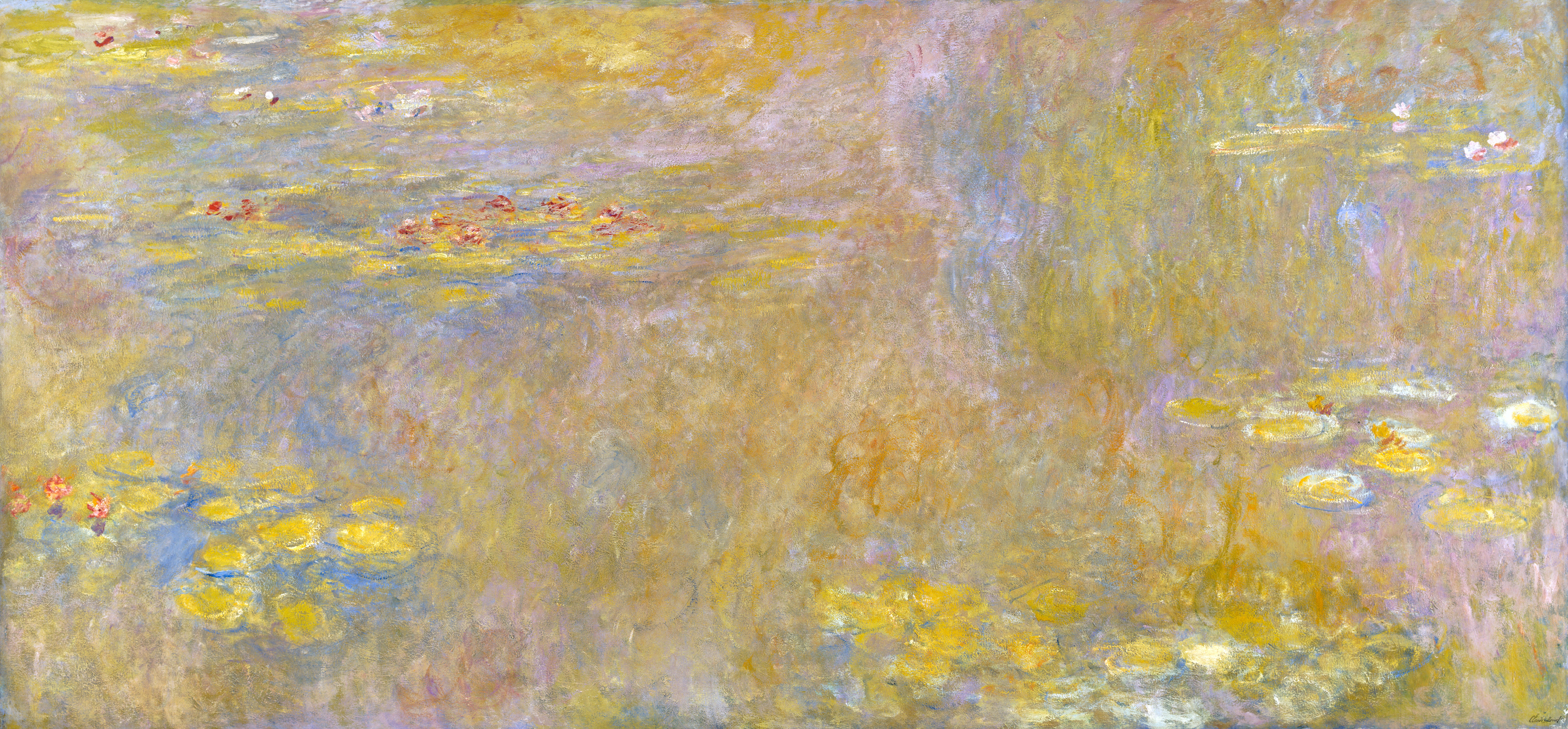
Claude Monet, 1916, Water-Lilies

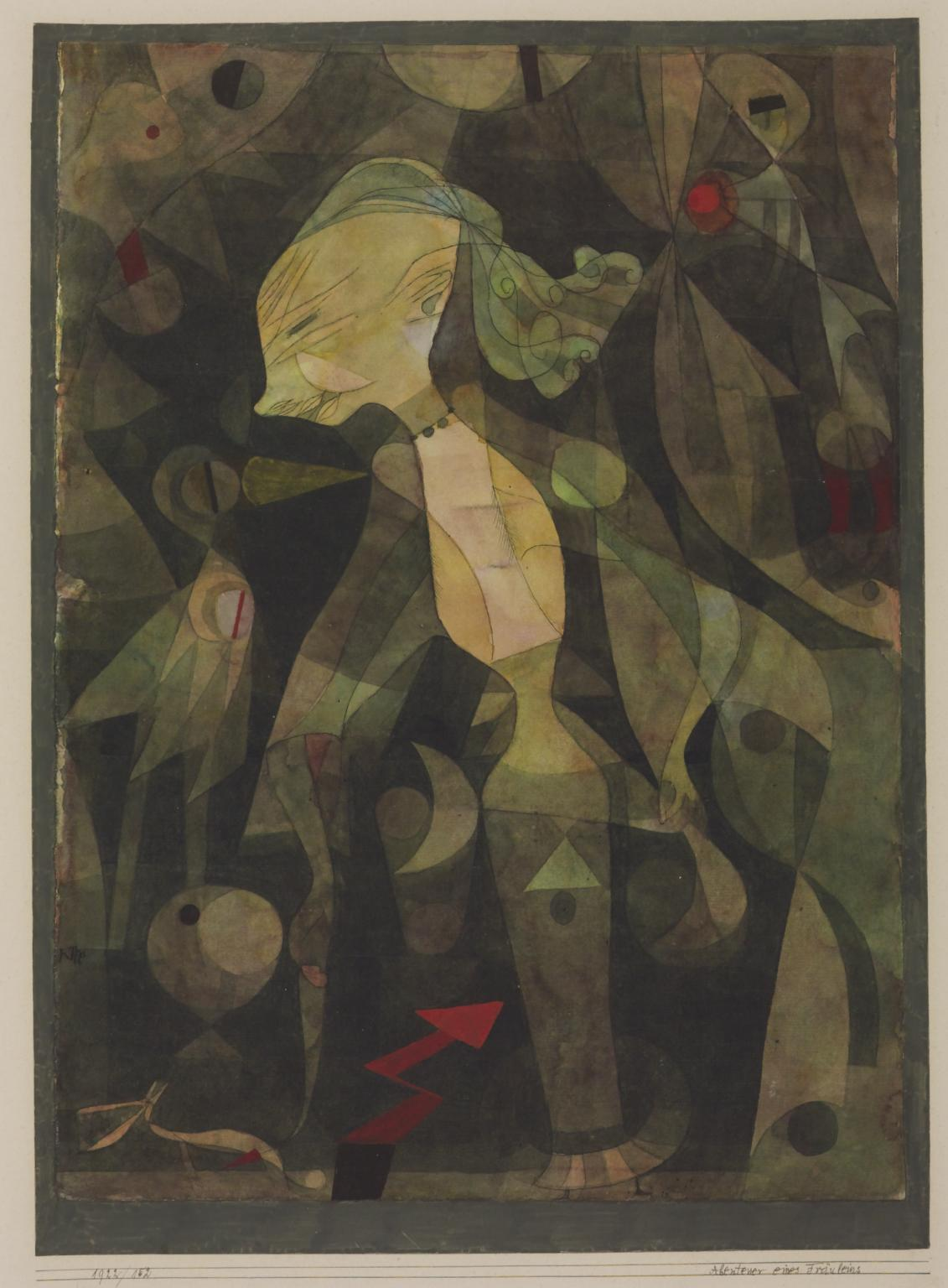
Paul Klee, 1921, Abenteuer eines Fräuleins (A Young Lady's Adventure), watercolor on paper, 43.8 × 30.8 cm

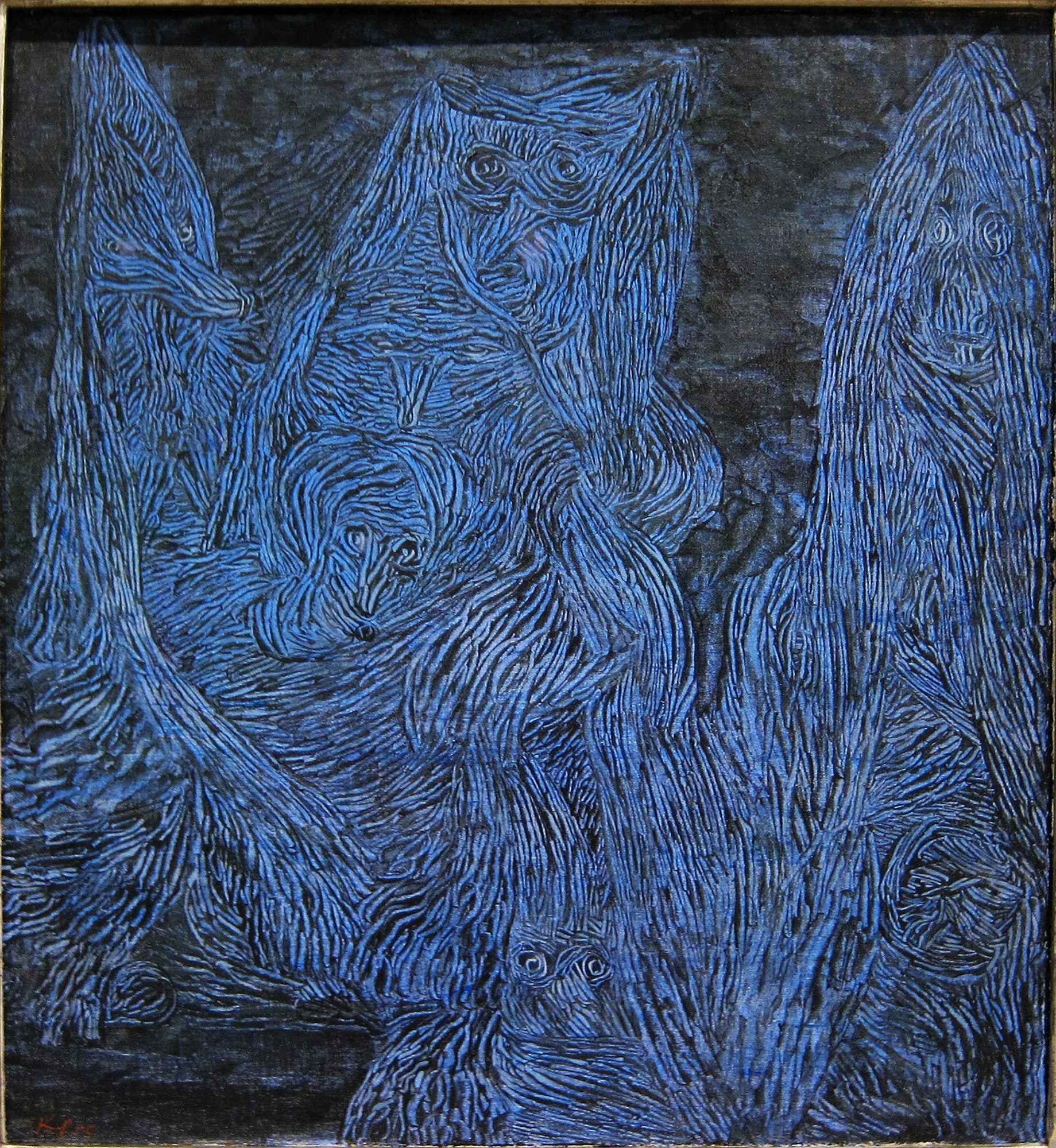
Paul Klee, 1935, Walpurgisnacht (Walpurgian Night)

== See also ==
- List of most visited museums in the United Kingdom
- List of most visited art museums
- List of largest art museums
- List of museums in London
