= 102 Petty France =

Office building in London, England

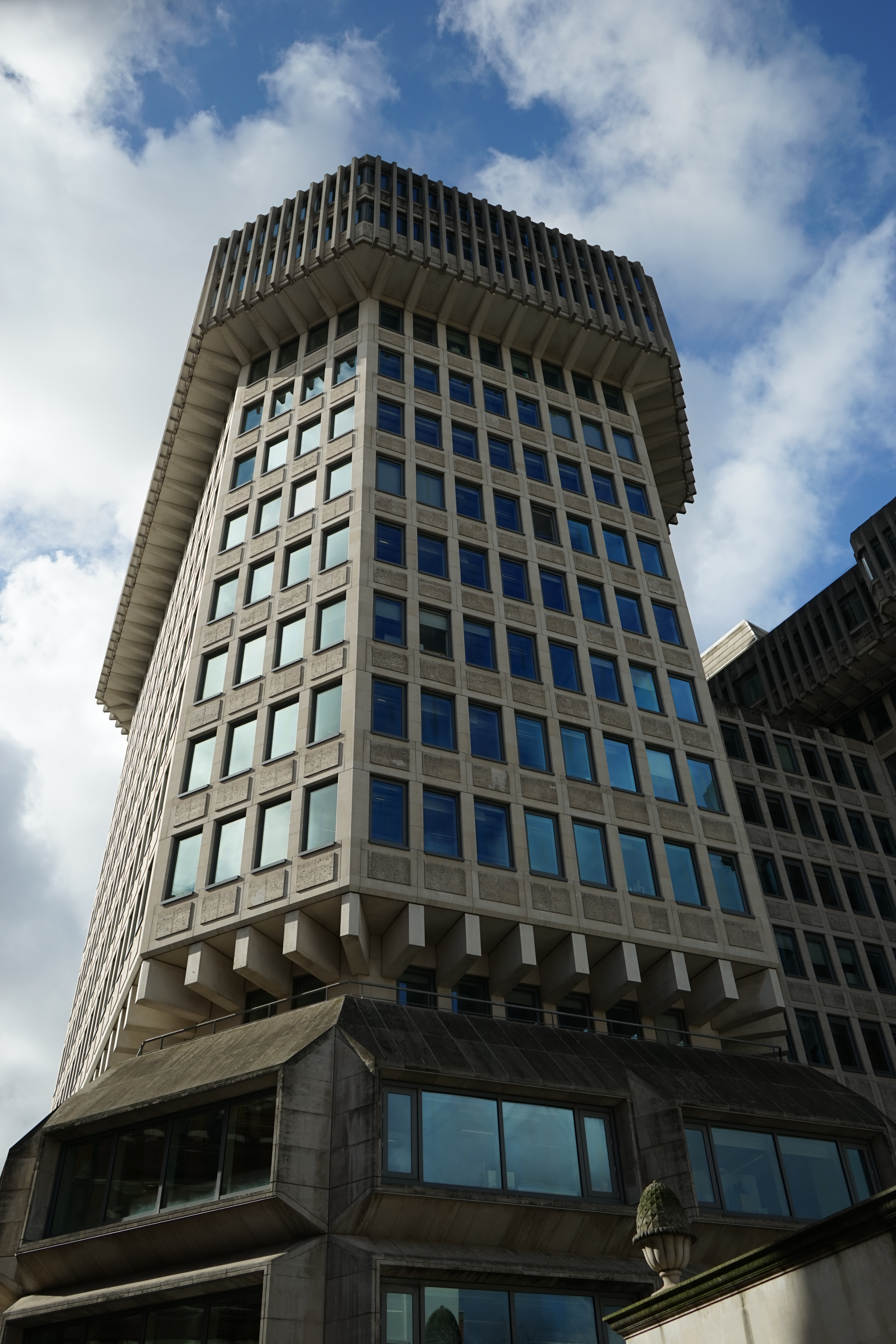
- 102 Petty France photographed from Broadway

- Location within City of Westminster Location within Greater London
- Former names: 50 Queen Anne's Gate

General information
- Coordinates: 51.4999°N 0.1346°W

Height
- Height: 56 metres (184 ft)

Technical details
- Floor count: 14
- Floor area: 51,000 square metres (550,000 sq ft)

Design and construction
- Architects: Fitzroy Robinson & Partners; Sir Basil Spence

102 Petty France is an office block on Petty France in Westminster, London, England, overlooking St James's Park, which was designed by Fitzroy Robinson & Partners, with Sir Basil Spence, and completed in 1976. It was well known as the main location for the UK Home Office between 1978 and 2004, when it was known as 50 Queen Anne's Gate; it now houses departments including the Ministry of Justice, His Majesty's Courts and Tribunals Service, the Crown Prosecution Service, Office for Budget Responsibility, and the Government Legal Department. The building is 56 metres (184 ft) tall, with 14 floors providing 51,000 square metres (550,000 sq ft) of office space.

== History ==
The site was previously occupied by the 14-storey mansion block Queen Anne's Mansions, which was despised by some architectural commentators: Lord Reigate, speaking in the House of Lords in 1972 against the plans for the new building, used Nikolaus Pevsner's description "that irredeemable horror". However, the new building's architecture was not favourably received, either, owing to its scale and massing with protruding elements at the upper and lower floors, often being described as a Brutalist design: it was sometimes known to those who worked there as "the Lubyanka". Fodor's guide to London described it as "hulking", and Lord St John of Fawsley remarked that "Basil Spence's barracks in Hyde Park ruined that park; in fact, he has the distinction of having ruined two parks, because of his Home Office building, which towers above St James's Park." The building originated as a speculative office development, but the Home Office moved in owing to lack of space in its previous headquarters in Whitehall.

In spring 2005, the Home Office moved to a new purpose-built building at 2 Marsham Street designed by Terry Farrell. The Queen Anne's Gate building had a major refurbishment undertaken, having come into the ownership of Land Securities. It has been the home of the Ministry of Justice since 2008, with the building renamed 102 Petty France.

In May 2025, it was announced that the government would vacate 102 Petty France, as part of a wider plan to move thousands of civil servant jobs out of London. The timeframe for closing the office has yet to be published.
