= Fitzroy Robinson & Partners =

British architectural firm

Fitzroy Robinson & Partners was one of the UK's largest firms of architects. It was based at Devonshire Street in London and founded by Herbert Fitzroy Robinson.

== History ==
The firm was established by Herbert Fitzroy Robinson in 1956. Public buildings designed by the firm included 102 Petty France in London, originally the headquarters of the Home Office and now the home of the Ministry of Justice, and the 1962 Northern extension to the furniture store of Heal & Son. The firm was acquired by Aukett Associates in 2005.
