= The Great Favourite =

The Great Favourite, or the Duke of Lerma is a stage play written by Sir Robert Howard, a historical drama based on the life of Francisco Goméz de Sandoval y Rojas, Duke of Lerma, the favourite of King Philip III of Spain. The play has often been considered Howard's best dramatic work, as well as a step in the development of the heroic drama of the Restoration era.

== Performance and publication ==
The play was premiered onstage on 20 February 1668, acted by the King's Company at the Theatre Royal, Drury Lane. Nell Gwyn played Lerma's daughter Maria. Samuel Pepys saw the play in the company of King Charles II and his court at its first performance, as he recorded in his Diary. (Pepys interpreted the play as a veiled criticism of Charles's conduct with his mistress, and wrote that he had expected the King to interrupt the performance — though this did not occur.)

The play was published in a quarto edition that same year by Henry Herringman, and printed again in a folio collection of Howard's works in 1692.

== Authorship ==
In his Preface to the 1668 edition, Howard states that the King's Company had possessed an old play on the subject of the Duke of Lerma — an "unfit" thing that was yet "written with higher Style and Thoughts than I could attain to." Howard reworked the old play, "altering the most part of the Characters, and the whole Design...." Alfred Harbage has argued that this old play was a lost work by John Ford, based on resemblances between The Great Favourite and Ford's distinctive drama. Other scholars have suggested that the old play reworked by Howard was The Spanish Duke of Lerma, a lost drama by Henry Shirley that was entered into the Stationers' Register on 9 September 1653 but never published.

The Great Favourite is written in a mixture of blank verse and rhymed verse. Rhyme was coming to be the dominant fashion in the heroic drama of the Restoration, while the earlier Caroline drama of Ford and Shirley and their contemporaries had favoured blank verse. The two contrasting styles within The Great Favourite may yield some insight into the extent of Howard's rewrite versus the surviving portions of the original text.

== Dryden ==
Howard's brother-in-law John Dryden composed the play's verse Prologue, spoken in the theatre. Though Howard and Dryden were colleagues and occasional collaborators (on The Indian Queen of 1664), they also had a brief controversy about the use of rhyme and the role of public taste in drama. Their dispute was played out in their writings of the later 1660s, especially Dryden's Essay of Dramatick Poesie and the Preface to The Great Favourite.

== The plot ==
Howard depicts Lerma as "a Renaissance Overreacher, a Grand Machiavel characterized by enormous ambition, unscrupulousness, and magniloquence." The Duke is a cynical and blasphemous manipulator who promotes his own followers and opposes the established nobility; he is willing to prostitute his daughter Maria to gain influence over the young prince Philip; he even plots the murder of the Queen Mother. The ageing King Philip II moves to restrain Lerma and even banishes him; but then the old king dies, and Lerma ascends in power with the new reign of Philip III. In time, Lerma appears to go too far; the virtuous members of the court, including the Duke of Alva and Lerma's brother the Duke of Medina, re-assert themselves, and it seems that Lerma will endure the conventional fall from grace of his character type. Yet Lerma escapes this expected fall in the final act, by purchasing a cardinal's office from a corrupt Papacy.

== Interpretation ==
Seventeenth-century readers and audiences were adept at drawing socio-political implications from works of literature and drama (as with the example of Pepys, cited above). Howard's portrayal of the Duke of Lerma was seen by contemporaries as a critique of the Earl of Clarendon, formerly Charles's Lord Chancellor and close confidante. Howard was associated with the "country party" that was then evolving in opposition to Court interests in the English political scene of the day. (Since Clarendon had, by 1668, already fallen from favour — he had been impeached by the House of Commons and fled to France the previous year — Howard's perceived criticism was far less risky than it would have been a few years earlier.)
