= Claricilla =

Play written by Thomas Killigrew

Claricilla is a Caroline era stage play, a tragicomedy written by Thomas Killigrew. The drama was acted c. 1636 by Queen Henrietta's Men at the Cockpit Theatre, and first published in 1641. The play was an early success that helped to confirm Killigrew's choice of artistic career.

== Publication ==
Claricilla was entered into the Stationers' Register on 4 August 1640 and published the next year in a duodecimo volume that also contained Killigrew's first play, The Prisoners. The volume was printed by Thomas Cotes for the bookseller Andrew Crooke. The book included commendatory verses by William Cartwright and by Henry Bennet, 1st Earl of Arlington.

The play was later included in Comedies and Tragedies, the collected edition of Killigrew's plays issued by Henry Herringman in 1664; in this collection it is dedicated to Killigrew's sister, Lady Shannon. This edition states that the play was written in Rome, during Killigrew's Continental travels in 1635–36.

In addition to the two printed texts, a manuscript of the play dated 1639 survives with a title-page in Killigrew's hand (Harvard, Houghton Library, MS Thr 7).

== Genre ==
Killigrew's choice of the tragicomic genre for his first three plays, The Prisoners, Claricilla, and The Princess, made sense in terms of his social and cultural milieu. Killigrew was aspiring to join a circle of dramatists associated with the English royal court and especially with the coterie around Queen Henrietta Maria. That circle of playwrights included Cartwright, Lodowick Carlell, and Sir John Suckling (and, to a more qualified degree, Sir William Davenant). They tended to produce tragicomedies tinged with themes of Platonic love, the favored genre of the Queen's court. (For an extreme example of the Queen's type of drama, see The Shepherd's Paradise.)

When Killigrew was no longer committed to that type of courtly drama, he would write a radically different kind of play, in his comedy The Parson's Wedding.

== The name ==
In the original 1641 edition, the play's title and the heroine's name is spelled "Claracilla." The spelling was changed to "Claricilla" in the 1664 collection. Normally, scholars would give the original spelling priority; yet since there are indications that Killigrew oversaw Herringman's 1664 collection, the revised spelling appears to have the authority of the creator, and many scholars have accepted it on that basis.

In either spelling, the name may derive from "Chariclea," the name of the heroine in the Aethiopica of Heliodorus, one of Killigrew's sources for the plot of his play.

In a verse prologue to his play The Doubtful Heir, James Shirley notes the contemporary fashion for naming plays after their heroines. The examples he cites are Claricilla and Suckling's Aglaura.

== The 1653 performance ==
Claricilla was one of the rare plays surreptitiously acted during the Interregnum, when the London theatres were officially closed; the 1653 performance at Gibbon's Tennis Court was raided by the authorities. The performance was allegedly betrayed by an actor. A contemporary source, the Royalist periodical Mercurius Democritus, hinted that the guilty party was William Beeston. In its 2–9 March issue, the periodical blamed "An ill Beest, or rather Bird" for betraying the Claricilla actors, because they denied him a share in the proceeds – and indicated that this actor was involved in attempts to stage plays "in his own house." The "ill Beest" may signify Will Beeston; as for the "Bird," actor Theophilus Bird was Beeston's brother-in-law and business associate. Beeston was then trying to resume dramatic performances at his "house," the Salisbury Court Theatre. And Beeston controlled the rights to Claricilla, explaining why he would feel entitled to a share of the profits of any performance.

== In the Restoration ==
Killigrew produced a revival of Claricilla early in the Restoration period, in December 1660, with his King's Company. Samuel Pepys saw it on 4 July 1661. Pepys saw the drama again at the Cockpit on 5 January 1663, when it struck him as a "poor play," and on 9 March 1669, when he conceded in his Diary that "there are a few good things in it."
