= The Prisoners (play) =

Stage play by Thomas Killigrew

The Prisoners is a Caroline era stage play, a tragicomedy written by Thomas Killigrew. It was premiered onstage c. 1635, acted by Queen Henrietta's Men at the Cockpit Theatre; and was first printed in 1641. Killigrew's first play, The Prisoners inaugurated its author's playwriting career.

== Genre ==
Killigrew's first essay in drama was in the tragicomic genre, as were his subsequent plays Claricilla and The Princess. This is unsurprising, since tragicomedy was the favored genre of the court of Queen Henrietta Maria. The courtier dramatists of the 1630s, men like William Cartwright, Lodowick Carlell and Sir John Suckling, worked largely in tragicomedy. And Killigrew the courtier functioned in the same social and artistic milieu; "As part of Henrietta Maria's circle, he penned the courtly romances she favoured, such as The Prisoners...." (For an extreme example of the type of drama favored at the Queen's court, see The Shepherd's Paradise.)

== Publication ==
The Prisoners as entered into the Stationers' Register on 24 May 1640; it was published together with Claricilla in a single duodecimo volume in 1641, a book printed by Thomas Cotes for the bookseller Andrew Crooke. The volume featured commendatory poems by William Cartwright and Henry Bennet, 1st Earl of Arlington.

In the 1641 edition, each of the plays has a separate title page; and while the title page for Claricilla is correctly dated "1641," that for The Prisoners is misdated "1640." This was a common feature of some of the early collected editions of plays in the seventeenth century. In, for example, the 1659 collection of Richard Brome's works, Five New Plays (also published by Crooke), the plays have separate title pages, and three are misdated "1658." It is generally thought that the booksellers of the mid-seveneteenth century designed their collections so that the plays could be sold either individually or collectively, as market conditions warranted; and that practical and financial constraints sometimes extended the preparation of a collection over more than one calendar year.

No evidence indicates that The Prisoners was ever issued in a single-play edition, either in 1640 or at any other time in the seventeenth century.

The misdating phenomenon recurs in the publication history of The Prisoner. The play next appeared in print when it was included in Comedies and Tragedies, the collected edition of Killigrew's plays issued by Henry Herringman in 1664. Several of the plays in that volume have individual title pages dated "1663."

In the collected edition, The Prisoners is dedicated to the dramatist's niece, Lady Crompton.

== Location ==
The collected edition also specifies the city in which Killigrew wrote each drama. Almost all of the plays were written in the various cities in Europe — Paris, Venice, Naples, Florence, Turin, Madrid, even Basel in Switzerland — where Killigrew lived during his Continental travels (1635–41) and his years in exile during the Commonwealth era (1647–60). Only The Prisoners was written at home in England, in London.

== Style and manner ==
Like other tragicomedies of its era, the play belongs to a lush realm of fantasy and romance with limited relationship to reality. The play provides an "overplus" of "adventure, heroic dialogue, and sentiment...The Prisoners introduces us to a melodramatic pirate, Gillipus, who holds nobles as his slaves and kidnaps princesses. The locus is Sardinia and several scenes take place at sea." The action is "brisk."
