= The Wild Gallant =

Restoration comedy by John Dryden

The Wild Gallant is a Restoration comedy written by John Dryden. It was Dryden's earliest play, and written in prose, except for the prologue, and the epilogue, which are in verse. It was premiered on the stage by the King's Company at their Vere Street theatre, formerly Gibbon's Tennis Court, on February 5, 1663. (The play's opening scene is a prologue that features a pair of astrologers drawing horoscopes on the play's fortunes for that date.) As Dryden himself stated in his Preface, it was "the first attempt I made in Dramatique Poetry."

== Sources ==
Like the earliest works of multiple authors, and also like other Restoration plays, The Wild Gallant is a derivative work: Dryden borrowed from several previous authors and plays, as far back as Ben Jonson's Every Man Out of His Humour (1599). Dryden admired the versification of Sir John Suckling, and quoted and paraphrased Suckling in his play.

== Revision ==
In his Preface to the first edition of the play, Dryden admitted that "The Plot was not Originally my own...." Critic Alfred Harbage argued that Richard Brome was the likely author of the work in its original form. (Harbage made this argument regarding two plays connected with the Dryden canon, The Wild Gallant and The Mistaken Husband.) Harbage noted that in The Wild Gallant Lady Constance fakes a pregnancy with a pillow under her dress, just as Annabelle does in Brome's The Sparagus Garden. Other elements in the play's plotting and style also indicate Brome, in Harbage's view. The play's stylistic inconsistencies have been observed by other critics — one referring to the "Jonsonian" aspects of the play; but Brome was a dedicated follower of Jonson, and the play's "Jonsonian" features can just as easily be considered "Bromian."

If Harbage's argument is valid, it contains a measure of irony: Dryden mixed Brome with Suckling in his potpourri of influences and borrowings, and Suckling and Brome were theatrical rivals. [See: Aglaura; The Court Beggar.]

== Reception ==
Dryden composed a set of verses addressed to Lady Castlemaine, the mistress of King Charles II, crediting her with "encouraging" this early play. Dryden's first effort was not, however, a success with its original audience; "the greater part condemn'd it," as Dryden himself put it. Samuel Pepys saw the second Court performance on February 23, 1663, and in his Diary called it "so poor a thing as ever I saw in my life almost...." (Pepys complained that even at the end of the play he could not tell which character was the Wild Gallant.) Some commentators considered it coarse, even by the libertine standards of the era. Dryden re-wrote the comedy, and it was more successful when revived in 1667.

== Publication ==
The play was first published in 1669, in a quarto printed by Thomas Newcomb for the bookseller Henry Herringman. That text is the revised version of 1667, not the original of 1663. Other editions followed in 1684 and 1694, both from Herringman.
