= 1668 in literature =

List of years in literature	(table)
- … 1658; 1659; 1660; 1661; 1662; 1663; 1664; 1665; 1666; 1667; 1668; 1669; 1670; 1671; 1672; 1673; 1674; 1675; 1676; 1677; 1678 …
- Art; Archaeology; Architecture; Literature; Music; Philosophy; Science; +...

This article contains information about the literary events and publications of 1668.

== Events ==
- c. February – The English Parliament and bishops seek to suppress Thomas Hobbes' treatise Leviathan.
- September 9 – Molière's comedy The Miser (L'Avare) is first performed, at the Théâtre du Palais-Royal (rue Saint-Honoré) in Paris.
- unknown date – Izaak Walton's The Compleat Angler goes into its fourth edition.

== New books ==
=== Prose ===
- Juan Caramuel – Primus calamus
- Meric Casaubon – Of Credulity and Incredulity
- Josiah Child – Brief Observations concerning Trade and the Interest of Money
- Jean Claude – Réponse au livre de P. Nouet sur l'eucharistie
- Jan Comenius – The Way of Light
- John Dryden – Essay of Dramatick Poesie
- Richard Duckworth and Fabian Stedman – Tintinnalogia, or, the Art of Ringing
- Richard Flecknoe – Sir William Davenant's Voyage to the Other World
- Hans Jakob Christoffel von Grimmelshausen – Simplicius Simplicissimus (first picaresque novel in German, dated 1669 but probably published this year)
- Johannes Hevelius – Cometographia
- Peter Heylin – Cyprianus Anglicanus (biography of William Laud)
- Urban Hjärne – Stratonice (completed)
- Adriaan Koerbagh – Een Bloemhof
- Henry Neville – The Isle of Pines
- William Penn – Truth Exalted
- Francisco Santos – Periquillo el de las gallineras
- John Wilkins – An Essay towards a Real Character and a Philosophical Language

=== Drama ===
- Roger Boyle, 1st Earl of Orrery
  - Tryphon (performed)
  - Henry V (published)
  - Mustapha (published)
- Margaret Cavendish – Plays, Never Before Printed, Written by the Thrice Noble, Illustrious, and Excellent Princess, the Duchess of Newcastle (closet dramas)
- Sir William Davenant – The Man's the Master (a translation of Paul Scarron's Jodelet, ou le maître valet)
- John Dryden – An Evening's Love
- George Etherege – She Would If She Could
- Sir Robert Howard – The Great Favourite or the Duke of Lerma
- Molière
  - L'Avare (The Miser)
  - George Dandin ou le Mari confondu
- Sir Charles Sedley – The Mulberry-Garden
- Thomas Shadwell – The Sullen Lovers

=== Poetry ===
- Abraham Cowley – Poemata Latina (posthumous)
- Sir John Denham – Poems and Translations
- Jean de La Fontaine – Fables choisies, mises en vers
- Georg Stiernhielm – Musæ Suethizantes

== Births ==
- May 8 – Alain-René Lesage, French novelist and playwright (died 1747)
- September – Joseph Bingham, scholar (died 1723)
- November (baptised) – Thomas Woolston, deist writer (died 1731)
- November 11 – Johann Albert Fabricius (died 1736)
- December 21 – Herman Boerhaave, humanist (died 1738)

== Deaths ==
- April 7 – Sir William Davenant, poet and playwright (born 1606)
- May 21 – Josephus Adjutus, theologian (born c. 1602)
- August 9 – Jakob Balde, Latinist poet and academic (born 1604)
- November 17 – Joseph Alleine, Nonconformist writer (born 1634)
- December 11 – Marquise-Thérèse de Gorla, actress (born 1633)
- December 22 – Stephen Daye, first American printer (born 1594)
- December 23 – Martin Baučer, Slovene historian (born 1595)
