= Thomaso =

Play by Thomas Killigrew

Thomaso, or the Wanderer is mid-seventeenth-century stage play, a two-part comedy written by Thomas Killigrew. The work was composed in Madrid, c. 1654. Thomaso is based on Killigrew's personal experiences as a Royalist exile during the era of the Commonwealth, when he was abroad continuously from 1647 to 1660.

Thomaso is now best known as the foundation upon which Aphra Behn constructed her most popular and respected play, The Rover, or the Banished Cavaliers (1677).

== Autobiography ==
Though Killigrew drew upon Mateo Alemán's picaresque novel Guzmán de Alfarache for source material, his Thomaso is generally considered strongly autobiographical; it is no accident that the title is the Spanish version of the playwright's given name. Like his earlier comedy The Parson's Wedding (but unlike the tragicomedies that make of most of his dramatic output), Thomaso features abundant bawdy humour and sexual frankness, to the discomfiture of generations of traditional critics. Killigrew's heroine Angellica speaks out for the emotional freedom of women, and Thomaso is an unblushing libertine.

Critical responses to autobiographical works often confuse the author and the work. Theatrical rival Richard Flecknoe published a book titled The Life of Thomaso the Wanderer (1676) that lambasted Killigrew with a sweeping personal attack. Flecknoe asserted that Killigrew was "born to discredit all the Professions he was of; Traveller, Courtier, Soldier, and Buffoon."

== Publication ==
Both parts of Thomaso were first published in Comedies and Tragedies, the collected edition of Killigrew's plays that Henry Herringman issued in 1664. In the collected edition, Thomaso is dedicated to "the fair and kind friends to Prince Palatine Polixander."

The printed text divides the play into a Part 1 and Part 2 of five Acts each. Critics note, however, that Part 1 provides no dramatic denouement at its end, so that the work is, in effect, a single ten-Act work (a characteristic Thomaso shares with the author's other double dramas, Cicilia and Clorinda and Bellamira Her Dream).

== Abortive performance ==
Thomaso was never performed in the seventeenth century, and certainly not since; many critics regard it as unactable, and place it securely in the category of closet drama. Yet Killigrew once attempted to mount an unorthodox production of the play. In October 1664, Killigrew's King's Company gave an unprecedented all-female-cast production of his Parson's Wedding. At the same time, Killigrew prepared a similar all-women staging of Thomaso. A cast list for the intended production survives; the leading actress Anne Marshall was intended for the role of Angelica, Mary Knep was cast as Lucette, and beginner Nell Gwyn was also in the cast. The list also assigns the 14-year-old "Nelly" the part of "Paulina, a courtesan of the first rank"––a role she would soon fill in real life.

The production, meant for November 1664, never materialised, perhaps due to the inherent dramatic limitations of Killigrew's expansive text. (Gwyn's stage debut had to wait another four months.)

== Plot ==
Thomaso is a young English gentleman living in Spain during the English Interregnum; he belongs to a set of other Royalist exiles, some of them serving in the Spanish army. The two plays deliver a very episodic picture of his life and adventures, through ten Acts and 73 scenes.

Thomaso impresses his compatriots with his wardrobe and his wit. He carries on a sexual liaison with the famous courtesan Angellica, and accepts gifts from her; she defends his conduct. Yet Thomaso also can maintain a more normal and morally and socially correct relationship with a woman when he chooses, and as he does with the virtuous (and wealthy) Serulina. (The play never reconciles the two erotic modes.)

A comic and farcical subplot centres on the character Edwardo, who is a foolish pretender to the gentility and honour that Thomaso genuinely possesses.

Critics and commentators have not hesitated to point out the obvious faults in Thomaso; verdicts like "rambling, long-winded" and "indulgent and inert" are common in the relevant literature.

== The Rover ==
Aphra Behn was a friend and colleague of Killigrew; her use of Thomaso for The Rover should not be misunderstood as any sort of artistic abuse or plagiarism.

"Aphra improved greatly on the original, and, in the first of the two plays she made from it, produced a masterpiece of light-hearted comedy, broad and outspoken, but not lacking in beauty of form and language. It was certainly one of the best plays of romantic intrigue written during the Restoration."

Behn's Willmore is her version of Killigrew/Thomaso.

The modern increase in critical attention to Behn and her works has meant an accompanying increase in attention to Behn's antecedents, including Killigrew's Thomaso. Commentators deplore Killigrew's misogyny – though some also note the curious streak of proto-feminism in his work, as when Angellica protests the "slavery" that women suffer.

Modern productions of The Rover have occasionally supplemented Behn's text with material from Thomaso.
