= Aglaura (play) =

Stage play by Sir John Suckling

Aglaura is a late Caroline era stage play, written by Sir John Suckling. Several aspects of the play have led critics to treat it as a key development and a marker of the final decadent phase of English Renaissance drama.

== Performance ==
Suckling's earliest play, Aglaura was staged in 1637 by the King's Men at the Blackfriars Theatre – not because they thought it was a good play or a potential popular hit, but because Suckling subsidized its production, reportedly spending between £300 and £400. The acting company was paid with the production's lavish costumes (lace cuffs and ruffs made of cloth of silver and cloth of gold), a form of hand-me-down compensation that the King's men accepted only in the 1630s, at a time when the company's fortunes were in relative decline. (When the same company staged a revival of John Fletcher's The Faithful Shepherdess in 1634, they used the sumptuous costumes that had been created for Queen Henrietta Maria's masque of that year, The Shepherd's Paradise; they were then allowed to keep the costumes.)

A 1638 production of Aglaura at the English royal court borrowed Inigo Jones's scenery from Luminalia, the Queen's masque of that year. Again, the hand-me-down nature of the proceedings is a noteworthy departure from the practices of the 1620s and earlier.

== Genre ==
Unusually, Suckling wrote the play as a tragedy, but added an alternative happy ending, so creating an optional tragicomedy. Suckling changed the ending for the April 1638 performance before the King, Charles I, and Queen Henrietta Maria.

== Publication ==
Aglaura was entered into the Stationers' Register on 18 April, 1638 and published later that year, in an edition printed by John Haviland for the bookseller Thomas Walkley – a vanity edition subsidized by Suckling. Instead of the quarto format then standard for individual plays, Aglaura was printed in the larger folio format, normally restricted for serious works. (Stage plays were then treated largely as ephemera with little claim as serious literature.) Critics – Richard Brome was prominent among them – mocked the folio edition of Aglaura, especially the unusually broad page margins that compensated for the limited text. (For modern readers, the pleasing innovation of the 1638 edition is that it abstained from the full and verbose titles fashionable in the 17th century, and employed a title of one word.) The play was reprinted by Humphrey Moseley in his octavo collection of Suckling's works, Fragmenta Aurea, in 1646 and 1648, and was included in subsequent collections. An early manuscript of the work also exists, in the collection of the British Museum (Royal MS. 18 C. 25).

A modern facsimile edition of Aglaura was issued in 1970, reproduced from the copy in the collection of the British Museum.

== Inspiration ==
Suckling may have based his heroine on a young woman named Mary Bulkeley, the daughter of Sir Richard Bulkeley. She was courted by the author, and is thought to have inspired him to write much of his best work.

== In the Restoration ==
Aglaura was revived during the Restoration era; it was reportedly played at the Red Bull Theatre on 27 February 1662, in the original version, "the tragical way." Later that same year, the actor Theophilus Bird was said to have broken his leg while fencing onstage in a performance of Aglaura. Samuel Pepys saw a King's Company production on 10 January 1668 (but he didn't like it). A Suckling lyric from the play, "Why so pale and wan, fond lover," became a popular song of the era. John Dryden, an admirer of Suckling's verse, borrowed lines from Aglaura for his first comedy, The Wild Gallant. Sir Robert Howard was impressed with Suckling's dual ending, and imitated it in his own play The Vestal Virgin.

== Plot ==
Suckling's plot is set in a wildly ahistorical and inauthentic Persia. The King of Persia and his son, Prince Thersames, are both in love with Aglaura; she loves the Prince, but the King takes precedence. The Queen, Orbella, is in love with the King's brother Ariaspes but is the mistress of Ziriff alias Zorannes, captain of the guard and Aglaura's brother. Iolas, a member of the royal council, is a pretended friend of the prince, but in fact a traitor; he is in love with Semanthe, who is in love with Ziriff. Complications ensue.

(Semanthe loves Ziriff – but platonically. This is Suckling's nod to the cult of Platonic love that was a cornerstone of Henrietta Maria's Court culture. Suckling also includes an anti-Platonic lord named Orsames, but doesn't do much with the Platonic theme.)

In the original tragic version, Aglaura secretly marries Thersames, but mistakenly stabs him to death, thinking he is the king. Most of the other characters, including Aglaura herself, die violent deaths. In the tragicomic revision, Aglaura merely wounds the prince, and the king repents and dispenses justice. (The actual difference between the versions amounts to only about 50 lines).

== Sources ==
- Downes, John. Roscius Anglicanus. 1708. Edited by the Rev. Montague Summers; reprinted New York, Benjamin Blom, 1968.
- Harbage, Alfred. Cavalier Drama. New York, Modern Language Association of America, 1936.
- Logan, Terence P., and Denzell S. Smith, eds. The Later Jacobean and Caroline Dramatists: A Survey and Bibliography of Recent Studies in English Renaissance Drama. Lincoln, NE, University of Nebraska Press, 1978.
- Madoc-Jones, Enid. "Mary Bulkeley – The Aglaura of the Poet Suckling." Anglo-Welsh Review 18 (1970).
