= The Princess (Killigrew play) =

Play by Thomas Killigrew

The Princess, or Love at First Sight is a Caroline era stage play, a tragicomedy written by Thomas Killigrew. The play was most likely written c. 1636, while Killigrew was travelling in Italy, and was acted on the stage c. 1638, by Queen Henrietta's Men at the Cockpit Theatre.

== Genre ==
As with his two previous plays, The Prisoners and Claricilla, Killigrew chose to work in the tragicomic genre for The Princess. He was working in the dramatic style favoured at the court of Queen Henrietta Maria. Tragicomedy, coloured by Neoplatonism and Platonic love influences, was the fashion in which courtier dramatists like William Cartwright, Sir John Suckling, and Lodowick Carlell were casting their dramas in the 1630s.

== Publication ==
Though written and acted late in the Caroline era, The Princess was not published until its inclusion in Comedies and Tragedies, the collected edition of Killigrew's plays issued by Henry Herringman in 1664. (Like some other plays in that volume, The Princess has a separate title page dated 1663, an inconsistency that causes confusion in Killigrew's bibliography.) The collected edition dedicates the play to Killigrew's niece Lady Anne Wentworth, the wife of Lord Lovelace; and it specifies that the play was written in Naples.

== Revival ==
Early in the Restoration era, Killigrew, then the manager of the King's Company, staged a new production of The Princess. Samuel Pepys attended the first performance on 29 November 1661. (As he recorded in his Diary, Pepys thought it "a poor thing.")

== Synopsis ==
Killigrew sets his play in a profoundly un-historical version of the ancient Roman world. His story concerns two sets of royal offspring. One consists of Facertes, Cicilia, and Lucius, the children of the late king of Sicily; and the other, Virgilius and Sophia, the (wildly fictitious) son and daughter of Julius Caesar. (Cicilia, a name that Killigrew would re-use in his later work Cicilia and Clorinda, was the name of his first wife: Cecilia Crofts.)

The play's opening scenes show Sicilian soldiers taking Roman prisoners. Among them is Sophia, daughter of Casear; she conceals her identity. The soldiers are drawn by her beauty, and contend as to who will have her; a prominent warrior called Cilius protects Sophia from mistreatment.

These scenes also begin to sketch in the play's backstory. Caesar has attacked an independent Sicilian kingdom; its king was killed in battle, and his son and heir Facertes taken prisoner. Facertes has been placed in the custody of Caesar's son Virgilius, who, commanding troops in the Gallic Wars, was not involved in the conquest of the island. Sicily is in a state of confusion; renegade soldiers turn pirate and engage in slave trading.

Facertes and Virgilius, two young men of noble nature, have become trusted friends; Virgilius lets his prisoner wear a sword and accompany him unguarded. Virgilius has guessed that Facertes has fallen in love with Sophia; and Virgilius has developed a plan for peace between Rome and Sicily, through a dynastic marriage between himself and Cicilia. With that goal in mind, the two young men go south.

Stopping in Naples, Virgilius sees a beautiful young woman in the slave market there, and instantly falls in love with her. Unknown to him, this is none other than Cicilia, Facertes' sister and his intended bride. He tries to buy her, but a local man purchases her first; this is Bragadine, son to the Roman viceroy of Sicily. Virgilus protests this; a brawl breaks out. Virgilius kills a soldier, and he and Facertes are pursued through the streets. A local woman named Paulina has watched the unfolding events; she has fallen in love with Virgilius, and hides him in her house. She knows Bragadine, and borrows his new slave. Facertes catches up with Virgilius at Paulina's house, and is re-united with his sister Cicilia. He tells her of Virgilius and his love for her; but Cicilia is appalled at the idea of marrying a conqueror and oppressor of her country. Through some emotional conversations, Virgilius begins to win Cicilia's heart despite her reservations.

The two young men try to leave the city at night, but are waylaid by Bragadine and his "Bravos." Though both are wounded, they kill their attackers in self-defense. (In tragicomedies – Killigrew's and others too – heroes suffer wounds but recover from them quickly and painlessly.) The two escape the city with Cicilia and Paulina and sail south on a galley.

Meanwhile, Cilius has failed in an attempt to purchase Sophia's freedom; to save her from the Neapolitan slave market, he sets the Roman prisoners free and escapes, with them and his followers, on a galley of his own. After a storm, the two parties blunder into each other on a deserted Calabrian coast. They fight; Cilius captures Facertes, Cicilia, and Paulina, but Virgilius, though wounded (again), escapes. Cilius soon tracks him down; they fight; more wounds. In the final revelation scene, Cilius turns out to be Lucius, the long-lost brother of Facertes and Cicilia. In the rather rushed and perfunctory conclusion, Virgilius wins Cicilia, and Facertes will marry Sophia; Cilius/Lucius loves her too, but this is forgotten about, as is Paulina's affection for Virgilius. Multiple plot holes (how did Caesar's daughter get captured by slavers; how did Sicilian princess Cicilia get captured by slavers; etc.) are left unfilled.

The main plot is accompanied by scenes of comic relief, featuring soldiers and clown characters.
