= The Parson's Wedding =

Play by Thomas Killigrew

The Parson's Wedding is a Caroline era stage play, a comedy written by Thomas Killigrew. Often regarded as the author's best play, the drama has sometimes been considered an anticipation of Restoration comedy, written a generation before the Restoration; "its general tone foreshadows the comedy of the Restoration from which the play is in many respects indistinguishable."

== Date and performance ==
Firm evidence for the play's date of authorship is lacking. Scholars have generally dated the play to c. 1637 or to the 1639–41 period. The play was allegedly composed in Basel in Switzerland. Killigrew may have been in the city in December and January in the winter of 1635–36, and perhaps began to draft the play at that time. Yet Killigrew apparently was also in Switzerland, in Geneva and Basel, in March 1640, and in Switzerland again in April 1641.

The play was performed in 1641, by the King's Men, in the Blackfriars Theatre. In Act V, Scene i, Killigrew refers to Joseph Taylor, the long-time leading man of that company; here, Killigrew is imitating Ben Jonson, who played the same trick of reference in his The Devil is an Ass (1616). In that play, Jonson mentions Richard Robinson, a King's Man actor who was cast of the play in which he's mentioned.

== Sources ==
Killigrew based his play, loosely, on the Spanish drama La Dama Duende (The Phantom Lady) by Pedro Calderón de la Barca. Some critics have also noted resemblances with Shackerley Marmion's The Antiquary (c. 1635) and Lording Barry's Ram Alley (c. 1607).

In the text of his play, Killigrew inserted prose paraphrases of poems by John Donne. Speeches in II, i, borrow from Donne's "A Lecture Upon the Shadow" and "Breake of Day," while a speech in IV, i, is indebted to "Loves Alchymie." "Killigrew probably intended his audience to catch the borrowings as part of an added level of wit."

== Publication ==
The Parson's Wedding did not appear in print until the collected edition of Killigrew's dramas, Comedies and Tragedies, was published by Henry Herringman in 1664. In that volume, each of the plays is identified with the European city in which Killigrew wrote the given work, mainly during his periods of foreign travel; and the collected edition assigns The Parson's Wedding to Basel.

It is an open question as to how much of the 1664 text of The Parson's Wedding represents the original Caroline-era work, and how much is the result of later revision. The play's apparent anticipation of Restoration drama may be, to some significant degree, an illusion inspired by post-1660 revision.

The play was dedicated to "Lady Ursula Bartu, Widow."

== Sexuality and religion ==
The bawdy tone of the play, notably different from Killigrew's earlier tragicomedies The Prisoners and Claricilla and The Princess, may have been a reaction to the highly artificial cult of Platonic love favoured at the Caroline era court of Queen Henrietta Maria. [See: The Shepherd's Paradise.] Biographers have also speculated that the play's dark outlook on sexuality and marriage may have been part of Killigrew's reaction to the 1638 death of his first wife, Celia Crofts.

Many plays in English Renaissance drama exploit bawdy humour and risqué subject matter; but they normally maintain at least a formal commitment to the established morality of the social order. Westward Ho and Northward Ho, two early Jacobean comedies by Thomas Dekker and John Webster, and the city comedies of Thomas Middleton, provide good examples of this tendency, as do many other dramas of the era. In The Parson's Wedding, Killigrew abandons even a lip-service acceptance of socially-approved morality; he is overtly and even gleefully cynical about the moral claims and sexual mores of society – especially in regard to marriage.

The two characters in the play who come closest to representing the established order, Lady Loveall and the Parson, are the biggest hypocrites, and fare the worst. Without being heavy-handed, Killigrew expresses the hostility toward the Puritans that is typical of the drama of the age. The minor character Crop is a Brownist who is given rough treatment; and the thoroughly-humiliated Parson is compared to leading Presbyterian divines like Stephen Marshall.

== Dramatis personae ==
The Dramatis personae of the 1664 edition:

- Mr CARELESS, a Gentleman, and a Wit.
- Mr WILD, a Gentleman, Nephew to the Widow.
- Mr JOLLY, a humorous Gentleman, and a Courtier.
- The CAPTAIN, a leading Wit, full of designs.
- The PARSON, a Wit also, but over-reached by the Captain and his WANTON.
- Mr CONSTANT, Mr SAD, two dull Suitors to the Lady Widow and Mrs PLEASANT.
- CROP, the Brownist, a Scrivener.
- Lady WILD, a rich (and somewhat youthful) Widow.
- Mrs PLEASANT, a handsome young Gentlewoman, of a good fortune.
- Mrs SECRET, her (indifferent honest) Woman.
- Lady LOVEALL, an old Stallion-hunting Widow.
- FAITHFUL, her (errant honest) Woman.
- Mrs WANTON, the Captain's livery Punk, married to the Parson by confederacy.

Bawds, Servants, Drawers, Fiddlers.

== The plot ==
The play opens on a heated conversation between the Captain and his paramour, Mistress Wanton. (In the seventeenth century, the title "Mistress," or "Mrs.," was applied to both married and single women; Wanton is single, beautiful, clever, and highly desirable.) The Captain is "in choler," angry at the conduct of his erstwhile friend the Parson. In past periods of poverty, the Parson was a humble acquaintance of the Captain and Wanton; but now that he has obtained a comfortable clerical benefice (a "fat living") through the patronage of Lady Loveall, the Parson looks down on his old friends. When Wanton reveals that the Parson once proposed marriage to her, the Captain is struck with an inspiration: they will arrange a marriage between the Parson and Wanton, as a way of working their revenge.

When the Parson enters, the Captain attacks him with lush and imaginative verbal abuse. The Parson responds in kind. Wanton takes the Parson's side in the argument, and the Captain pretends to storm off. The Parson impulsively renews his suit for Wanton's hand in marriage.

The following scenes introduce a profusion of other characters. The main players are:

- Lady Wild and Mrs. Pleasant, two attractive, witty, and desirable gentlewomen. Both single, they are the main potential romantic conquests of the play.
- Master Wild, the Lady's nephew, and his friend Master Careless; the main protagonists.
- Master Jolly; he and the Captain support and aid Careless and Wild in attaining Lady Wild and Mrs. Pleasant respectively. Both Jolly and the Captain are among the lovers of Lady Loveall, and contend over the possession of a favour (a pearl necklace) that Jolly obtains from her; but they can put that rivalry aside in pursuit of other sport and wit.
- Mr Constant and Mr. Sad, the two men who are the main rivals of the protagonists for the hands of Lady Wild and Mrs. Pleasant.

Most of the play is devoted to repartee among these characters. While the play contains some physical humour (in a scene in mid-play, Crop the Brownist is abused and ejected from London's Devil Tavern), it is dominated by verbal wit. The characters converse, quarrel, and flirt with each other, scheme with and manipulate each other, between eating and drinking. A small sample can be extracted from II, vii:

Pleasant: I beseech you, sir, let us never be better acquainted.
Jolly: I shall endeavour, lady, and fail in nothing that is in my power to disoblige you; for there is none more ambitious of your ill opinion than I.
Pleasant: I rejoice at it; for the less love, the better welcome still.

The Captain's plot against the Parson comes to fruition when the Parson goes to bed drunk; the plotters slip the elderly Bawd into his bed in place of Wanton, then burst in disguised as watchmen and constables. They drag him before a supposed Justice of the Peace (actually Mr. Wild in disguise). The Parson confronts social and professional ruin for his apparent sexual misconduct; even when the trick is revealed, he risks profound embarrassment over its possible exposure. The frightened Parson is cowed into the status of a wittol, a complaisant cuckold, as Wanton pursues her erotic adventures; he even joins in some of the further schemes of his tricksters.

Constant and Sad work their own scheme to trap Lady Wild and Mrs. Pleasant into matrimony; they exclude the two women from the Lady's own house by pretending that her coachman has died of the plague. (Killigrew's humour is bold enough to use bubonic plague as a casual element in his comedy.) The two women find refuge in the house of the Lady's nephew, Mr. Wild. Masters Careless and Wild work their own trick on the women, spreading the rumour that their marriages have already taken place and arranging appearances to that effect. To avoid public shame, the two women accept the two men as their husbands – marriages which are appropriate in the social world of the play. The Parson performs the ceremony that unites Mr. Careless with Lady Wild, and Mr. Wild with Mrs. Pleasant. (And Mrs. Wanton goes off with Mr. Jolly.)

This long prose play (it must have been cut significantly for stage performance) includes a range of noteworthy features. The character Faithful, who runs a charity hospital for the sufferers of sexually transmitted diseases, is one striking example.

== Epilogue ==
In the Epilogue to his play, Killigrew makes two references to his lack of formal education. He describes himself as "the illiterate Courtier who made this Play," and as "one that can scarce read, nay, not his own hand." This was an exaggeration; Killigrew was adopting the fashionable pose of the courtly amateur who lacks formal training.

== Restoration productions ==
In the 1660s and '70s, Killigrew was the head of the King's Company; and he gave his Parson's Wedding two of the more remarkable productions of the era. Twice, in October 1664 and in June 1672, he staged the play with all-female casts. Given the fact that women performers had been appearing regularly on the English stage only since 1661, the all-female productions were sensational and revolutionary in their day.

== Critical responses ==
Objections have been raised to The Parson's Wedding from its own time onward (Samuel Pepys called it "an obscene, loose play"). Traditional critics regularly condemned the play for "coarseness" and "vulgarity." Modern-day critics have judged the "libertine picaresque" aspect of the drama less harshly, and have praised the play as "energetic" and "unbridled" – "a loose, lively, bawdy city play." Mrs. Wanton's praise of sexual freedom is not offensive to modern readers who tend to accept her values.
