= Cicilia and Clorinda =

Tragicomedy by Thomas Killigrew

Cicilia and Clorinda, or Love in Arms is a 17th-century closet drama, a two-part, ten-act tragicomedy by Thomas Killigrew. The work was composed in Italy c. 1650–51, and first published in 1664.

== Genre and source ==
Like the majority of Killigrew's plays — stage plays or closet dramas — Cicilia and Clorinda is cast in the mode of tragicomedy, with its highly colored elements of romance, and limited realism. The play may be more interpreted and judged in the romance tradition than in the dramatic; the work is "a means of providing the matter of romance in an alternative form."

Killigrew employed the closet-drama form to work with material that would have met strong resistance on the public stage of his time. Cicilia and Clorinda is in part an exploration of the idea of the Amazon or "warrior woman" (he coined the term "Heroickess"). When Killigrew wrote the work, women were not yet allowed to appear onstage in England.

In writing the work, Killigrew was influenced by Artamène, ou Le Grand Cyrus, by Madeleine and Georges de Scudéry. His characters Amadeo, Lucius, and Manlius are versions of the French novel's Aglatidas, Artabes, and Megabises (Part 1, Book 3).

== Publication ==
Both parts of Cicilia and Clorinda were first printed in Comedies and Tragedies, the collected edition of Killigrew's plays issued by Henry Herringman in 1664. The collected edition specifies that Part 1 was written in Turin, and Part 2 in Florence, during Killigrew's years of exile in the English Commonwealth period. Part 1 is dedicated to Lady Anne Villiers, Countess of Morton, and Part 2 is dedicated to Lady Dorothy Sidney, Countess of Sunderland.

== Carew and Crofts ==
Killigrew includes the Thomas Carew poem "Song of Jealousy" in Cicilia and Clorinda Part 2, Act V scene ii, where it concludes the play. According to Killigrew, Carew wrote the poem in 1633, in response to a dispute between Killigrew and Cecilia Crofts, then a maid of honor to Queen Henrietta Maria and later Killigrew's first wife (1636–38). Carew also wrote a poem, "The morning stormy," in celebration of the Killigrew/Crofts wedding.

In addition to Cicilia and Clorinda, Killigrew employs his first wife's name for the heroine of his early play The Princess.

== Critical scrutiny ==
Often neglected by critics and readers, English closet dramas of the 17th century began to claim a greater share of critical attention toward the end of the 20th century. Margaret Cavendish has been the main beneficiary of this shift in focus, though writers like Killigrew and works like Cicilia and Clorinda have also benefitted.
