= Tempe Restored =

Play written by Aurelian Townshend

Tempe Restored was a Caroline-era masque written by Aurelian Townshend and designed by Inigo Jones, and performed at Whitehall Palace on Shrove Tuesday, 14 February 1632. It was significant as an early instance in which a woman appeared in a speaking role in a public stage performance in England.

== The show ==
At this point in the reign of King Charles I, two large-scale masque productions were being staged at Court each winter season. For 1632, Albion's Triumph, another masque written by Townshend and dedicated to the King, had been staged on Twelfth Night, 6 January; Tempe Restored, a masque dedicated to Queen Henrietta Maria, followed a month later. (It had originally been scheduled for mid-January but was delayed by an illness of the Queen – a "soreness" in one of her eyes.) The Queen was intimately involved in the creation of the masque; she appeared and danced in it, along with fourteen of her ladies in waiting. (One of the fourteen was Lucy Hay, Countess of Carlisle.) The role of Circe in the masque was filled by a Frenchwoman, identified in the text as "Madame Coniack;" this may have been Elizabeth Coignet, a gentlewoman of the Queen's court. A "Mistress Shepherd" was also in the cast; she sang the role of the ancient Greek goddess of Harmony.

Townshend based his text on a French masque (or ballet de cour) of fifty years before; titled Balet Comique de la Royne, it was written by Balthasar de Beaujoyeulx and performed in 1581 by the French queen, Louise de Vaudemont. In the production of Townshend's masque, a young Thomas Killigrew, then a page to the King, appeared in the role of "a Fugitive Favourite." In Townshend's version as in the French work, Circe is enraged at the escape of one of her captive lovers, who has run to the Vale of Tempe. Circe dominates the first part of the performance, which features anti-masques danced by American Indian, barbarian, and animal figures. (The animals were Circe's transformed lovers, who combined human and animal characteristics; one, for example, was a scholar or "pedant" who had been changed into an ass. In addition to the pedant/ass, six barbarians, and seven Indians, the anti-masques featured dancers costumed as five hogs, four lions, three apes, two hounds, and a hare.) The anti-masque is dominated by a monstrous being called the "Pagoda," a faux-Oriental demon with black wings, long claws, and a bestial countenance. Circe is supplanted by Harmony for the masque's serious second portion, which includes figures from classical mythology such as Jupiter and Pallas Athena. Henrietta Maria danced the role of "Divine Beauty," and descended to the stage in a bejewelled golden chariot.

== Women onstage ==
English actresses were not yet appearing on the stage in 1632 – though in Italy and France the prejudice against female performers was already in abeyance. (French actresses had appeared in England, to general hostility.) Henrietta Maria took a speaking role in a private 1626 performance of Honorat de Racan's pastoral Artenice, though this was far from a public performance. Tempe Restored was another step in the process of women appearing onstage in England. In the next year, the Queen would take a speaking role in Walter Montagu's masque The Shepherd's Paradise.

The role of women in Tempe Restored has drawn the attention of modern critics. Special notice has been taken of the point in the masque at which Circe dismisses Pallas Athena with the line, "Man-maid, begone!" — because Circe was played by a woman while Athena, in the traditional way, was played by a male performer.

== Cost ==
The Venetian ambassador to the Stuart Court, who witnessed Tempe Restored, described it in a letter as "a sumptuous masque performed with wonderfully rich decorations." Even so, the cost for the masque, at around £800, was fairly modest, compared to other masques of the era.

== Lawes and Comus ==
The English composer Henry Lawes appeared in Tempe Restored, and two years later composed the music for John Milton's masque Comus (1634). Comus has clear resemblances with Townshend's work – to the degree that one scholar has called Comus a sequel to Tempe Restored. Alice Egerton, the young daughter of the Earl of Bridgewater for whom Comus was staged, participated in both productions. The music for Tempe Restored, composer(s) unknown, has not survived.

== Publication ==
Townshend's text was published shortly after its 1632 premier, in a quarto edition issued by the booksellers R. Allel and G. Baker. In that edition, Townshend specifies that "the subject and allegory of the masque, with the descriptions and appearances of the scenes," originated with Inigo Jones and not with the author of the verse. (The masque features personifications of Invention, Knowledge, Theory, and Practice, who talk about the glories of architecture.) Scholars have speculated that Townshend might well have been unhappy with Jones's primacy in the project, and that this may have been why he generally avoided masque writing for the Court during the remainder of his career.
