= The Mistaken Husband =

Restoration comedy by John Dryden

The Mistaken Husband is a Restoration comedy in the canon of John Dryden's dramatic works, where it has constituted a long-standing authorship problem.

== Performance and publication ==
The play was first produced on stage by the King's Company at the Theatre Royal, Drury Lane in 1674, and was first published in a 1675 quarto issued by the booksellers James Magnes and Richard Bentley. The publishers credited the play's authorship to an anonymous "Person of Quality." In a Preface to the play, Bentley wrote that Dryden had had the anonymous play in his possession for many years; and "finding a Scene wanting he supply'd it" before turning it over to the actors of the King's Company. Bentley's statement may not be literally precise, and may mean that Dryden gave the anonymous original a light revision of some extent.

Dryden, however, responded negatively to this publication. In a note included in the first edition of his King Arthur (1691), Dryden complained about having been "imposed on by the booksellers foisting in a play which is not mine," and added a list of the plays and poems he'd written and published to that date.

== Authorship ==
The question of the identity of the play's original author remains open. Alfred Harbage argued, on the basis of internal evidence of plotting, style, and subject matter, that both The Mistaken Husband and another problematical Dryden work, The Wild Gallant, were based on otherwise-unknown plays by Richard Brome. Harbage asserts that the sexual scandal in The Mistaken Husband is typical of Brome's drama; he notes that Brome's The Northern Lass and The Mistaken Husband feature marriages dissolving on the basis on non-consummation; and he argues that "The frequent parenthetical constructions, the abrupt and often purposeless alternation of prose with blank verse...and, above all, the diction, the turn of phrase, the general atmosphere" in The Mistaken Husband all point to Brome.

Harbage's argument is plausible, though by no means certain. One Brome scholar has complained that "there is too little evidence to sustain" the case. Alexander Brome has also been suggested as a possible original author of The Mistaken Husband.

== Synopsis ==
The plot of the play is based on the Amphytrion of Plautus. In The Mistaken Husband the Senex iratus is Learcut, a wealthy and ruthless cheesemonger. He was resentful of his son-in-law Manley, a fortuneless younger brother who had eloped with Learcut's daughter. The old man refused to provide Manley with the young woman's dowry (worth £8000), and persecuted him with lawsuits until Manley was forced to flee abroad to avoid debtors' prison, before he and his wife had even consummated their marriage.

Nine years after these events, Manley tells his tale to Hazard, a clever but conniving gentleman (the play's Dramatis personae terms him "a cunning shifting fellow"). Hazard decides to impersonate Manley and return to England in his place. (Hazard bears a strong resemblance to Manley, and even inflicts a scar on himself to strengthen that resemblance.) He manages to convince Learcut, and halfway convince Mrs. Manley, that he is the real Manley; he wins Learcut's approval by claiming that a rich uncle has left him his fortune, and consummates the marriage in Manley's stead after a nine-year delay. Hazard then steals Learcut's gems and plate, and prepares to flee to America with the loot and Manley's wife. (Hazard is ruthlessly prepared to share the woman with his co-conspirator Underwit.) Hazard's schemes grow more extreme: he robs Learcut of an additional £1000, has Underwit imprison the old cheesemonger, and tells Mrs. Manley that her father has drowned.

The real Manley returns in time to prevent Hazard's final triumph; Hazard expresses his regret that he did not poison Manley to forestall this possibility. Yet Hazard boldly maintains his identity as Manley, even to Manley's face – though Mrs. Manley faints upon realising her error. Hazard and Underwit manage to get Manley arrested as a highwayman. Mrs. Manley tells Hazard that though she has fallen in love with him, she cannot live with him in sin; she attempts suicide. Hazard visits Manley in prison, telling him (truly) that Learcut is still alive and (falsely) that Mrs. Manley is still a virgin. Hazard offers to re-instate Manley in his own identity, which he says was his original plan. Manley strongly suspects that Hazard has had sex with his wife, but has little choice in accepting Hazard's offer. The three meet with Learcut at Learcut's home; Hazard says that he wants only to be allowed the occasional visit. Mrs. Manley favours this – which makes Manley suspect ever more strongly that he's been cuckolded.

The surprise resolution of this untenable situation is that Underwit is revealed as Learcut's long-lost son. He offers Manley the withheld dowry, if Manley departs. The marriage is legally void, since Manley has abandoned his wife for more than seven years; and he is ready to leave the "Skittish Jade, and have money to boot." Learcut offers his daughter's hand to Hazard, and Hazard is taken with her enough to accept, thus making an "honest woman" of her. He also vows to abandon his "wild follies and debaucheries" for a settled and normal life.
