= Cicilia =

Cicilia is a surname. Notable people with the surname include:

- Ayrton Cicilia (born 2001), Curaçaoan footballer
- Kenneth Cicilia (born 1981), Curaçaoan footballer
- Rigino Cicilia (born 1994), Curaçaoan footballer

== See also ==
- Cicilia and Clorinda
