= Charles Killigrew =

English courtier, theatre manager and Master of the Revels (1655–1725)

Charles Killigrew (1655–1725) was an English courtier, theatre manager and Master of the Revels.

== Life ==
Born at Maastricht on 29 December 1655, he was son of Thomas Killigrew (the elder), by his second wife, Charlotte, daughter of John de Hesse of Holland. He was gentleman of the privy chamber to Charles II, 1670, James II, 1685, and William III and Mary II, 1689. He was Master of the Revels in 1680, patentee of Drury Lane Theatre in 1682, and commissioner of prizes in 1707.

Killigrew lived at Somerset House, London, and Thornham Hall, Suffolk. His varied acquirements won him the friendship of John Dryden (cf. Dedication of Juvenal, 1693, p. xxiii), Humphrey Prideaux, and others. He was buried in the Savoy Hospital on 8 January 1725, leaving by his wife Jemima, niece of Richard Bokenham, mercer, of London, two sons, Charles (died 1756) and Guilford. His library was sold in the December following.
