= Hengist, King of Kent =

Stage play by Thomas Middleton

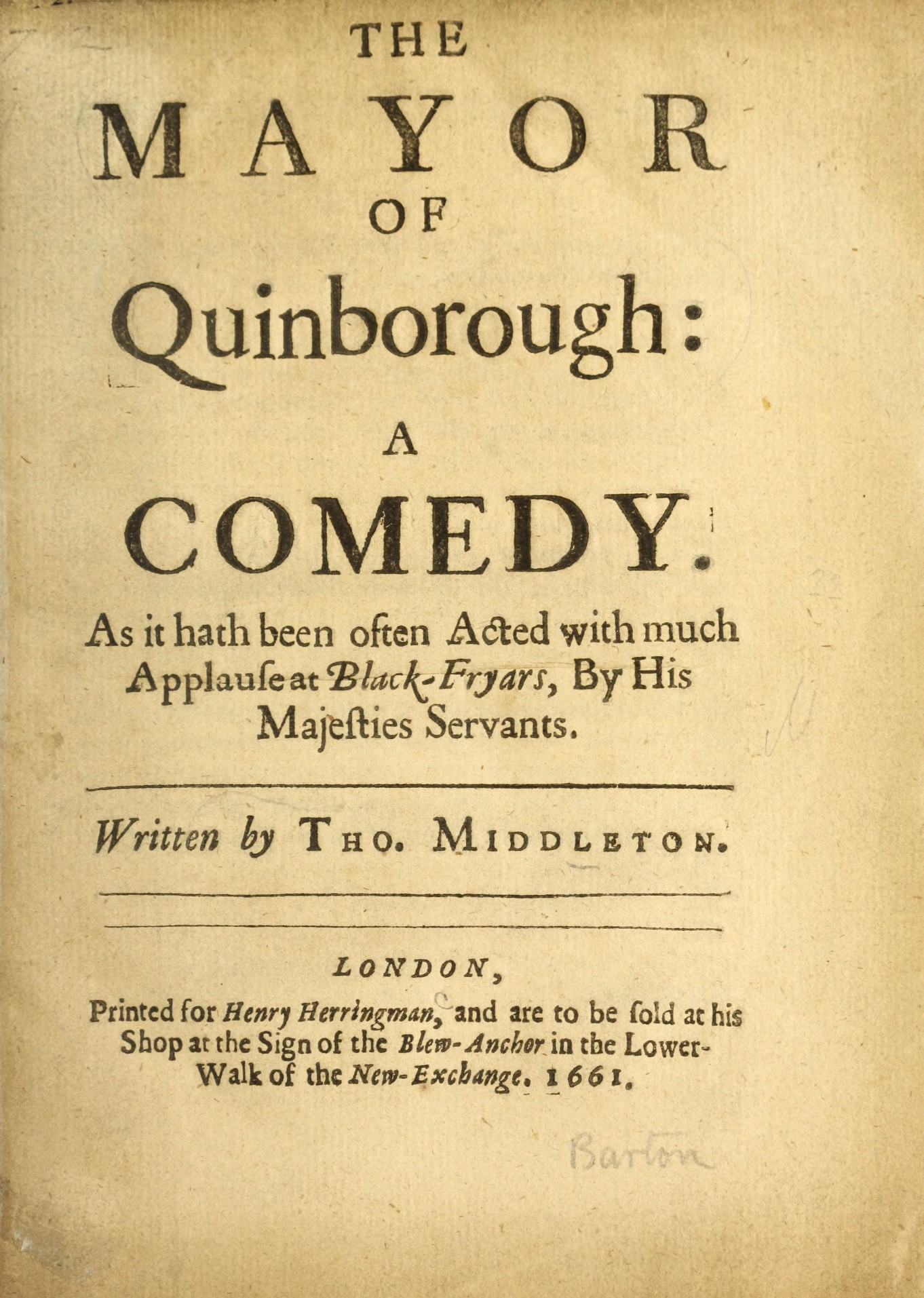
Title page of the first edition of the play, printed in 1661 under the title The Mayor of Quinborough

Hengist, King of Kent, or The Mayor of Quinborough is a Jacobean stage play by Thomas Middleton of the 1610s, but first published in 1661. Middleton's only overtly historical play, it tells the story of Saxon king Hengist during his wars against the Britons.

== Dating ==
The date of authorship of the play is uncertain, usually put about 1615–1620 (it was first performed c 1619-20 by the Kings Men). Some critics have argued for the close relationship between Hengist and The Changeling as an indication that they were written in close conjunction. "Both plays are lavish in the use of dumb-show; both revolve around a licentious woman (Beatrice-Joanna, Roxena) believed to be virtuous, and a chaste one (Isabella, Castiza) mistreated by an unworthy husband; and the role taken by Horsus, the secret love of Roxena, in planning villainies is not dissimilar to that of De Flores."

== Texts ==
The play was entered into the Stationers' Register on 4 September 1646, by Humphrey Robinson and Humphrey Moseley, but it was not published until 1661, when the bookseller Henry Herringman issued it under the title The Mayor of Quinborough. The title page of the first quarto assigns the play to "Tho. Middleton," and states that the play was acted by the King's Men at the Blackfriars Theatre, although no specific performances are known.

There are two extant manuscripts of the play, both of which are scribal copies of the theatre prompt-book. The Lambarde MS. is 1487.2 in the collection of the Folger Shakespeare Library in Washington D.C., while the Portland MS. is in the University of Nottingham Library.

== Authorship ==
Middleton's authorship of Hengist has never been seriously questioned, although a few scholars have postulated a contribution by Middleton's most frequent collaborator, William Rowley, in the comic subplot concerning the Mayor of Quinborough. David Lake, in his study of authorship questions in the Middleton canon, refutes the Rowley hypothesis, and assigns the play to Middleton alone.

== Genre ==
The play is an anomaly in Middleton's œuvre, as his only overt history play. Its genre does not prevent the playwright from injecting his usual sexual and thematic preoccupations. (One critic has called it "quirky".) In resorting to what by 1620 was a somewhat antiquated genre, Middleton chose to exploit an equally dated (from the 1620 perspective) dramaturgical technique: the murders of Constantius and Vortimer are acted out in dumb show instead of being portrayed in the usual combination of speech and action. Another dumb show features a personified Fortune figure.

== Title ==
Through most of its existence the play was known by the title that refers to its comic sub-plot, as is true of a few other English Renaissance plays, like Blurt, Master Constable (also attributed, by some, to Middleton). However, modern scholarship tends to prefer the title from the manuscripts, which refers to the play's main plot. Samuel Pepys was reading it as The Mayor of Quinborough on 16 June 1666, calling it "a simple play" in his diary.

In 2004 it was published by Nick Hern Books, under the title Mayor of Queenborough, edited by Howard Marchitello.

In the subplot, Middleton takes a satirical jab at the theatrical profession when, in Act V, scene i, three thieves pretend to be actors in order to cheat the mayor.
