= William Sheppard (painter) =

English portrait painter

William Sheppard (fl. 1641–1660) was an English portrait painter.

== Life ==
William Sheppard was an artist of some merit, who appears to have followed the fortunes of Thomas Killigrew, the poet and dramatist, for there are numerous versions of a portrait of Killigrew, which is stated to have been painted by Sheppard in 1650 at Venice. One of these entered the collection of the Duke of Bedford at Woburn Abbey; another entered that of the Earl of Kimberley. This portrait was finely engraved by William Faithorne the Elder.

Sheppard is first mentioned in February 1641 as a London "Picture maker". In July 1647 he rented a room in The Hague in the Netherlands for a year, although it is not known how long he stayed in the city. He was in Rome and Venice from 1649 until he travelled from Venice to Constantinople in 1651; otherwise, his whereabouts in the 1650s are unknown.

Sheppard appears to have returned to London at the Restoration, and to have lived near the Royal Exchange. It is stated that he eventually retired to live in Yorkshire. The artist Francis Barlow was his pupil.
