= Match Me in London =

Play by Thomas Dekker

Match me in London is a Jacobean era tragicomedy written by Thomas Dekker. It was written around 1621 and was relicensed without fee by George Buc on 21 August 1623 as 'an Old Playe'. On 8 November 1630 it was entered in the Stationers' Register and printed in a quarto in 1631. The play was dedicated to 'The Noble Lover, (and deservedly beloved) of the Muses, Lodowick Carlell, Esquire, Gentleman of the Bowes, and Groome of the King, and Queene's Privy-Chamber'.

== Synopsis ==
The play revolves around an imaginary Spanish Court. The lecherous King of Spain asks a bawd called Dildoman to procure a whore to him. Dildoman introduces him to Tormiella, the daughter of Andrada Malevento. Tormiella married a shoemaker called Cordolente, whereas her father wanted her to be the wife of another citizen called Gazetto. The later becomes furious when he discovers Tormiella has married the shoemaker and plans to be revenged. The disguised King enters the shoemaker's shop with Dildoman and invites Tormiella to dinner. Then, he reveals his true identity and takes her to Court for her to be his mistress.

Prince John, the King's brother, wants to usurp the throne. To begin with, he asks a doctor to poison Don Valasco, the father of the Queen. But the doctor only gives Don Valasco a sleeping potion that makes him look dead. The Queen is jealous of the king's love for his courtesan Tormiella and she decides to kill her. When Tormiella convinces her that she is not in love with the King but with her shoemaker, the Queen finally relents and decides to keep Tormiella as her maid.

The King discovers his brother's aspirations to overthrow him and has him executed. He also wants to get rid of the Queen so that he can safely marry Tormiella. He forges a treason plot against himself and accuses the Queen of being its instigator with the help of Portugal. He has her arrested and executed as well. The wedding between the King and Tormiella is interrupted by Cordolente, who calls his wife a whore. Then, a storm cancels the wedding.

When the King discovers that Tormiella has planned to kill him once they are married, a plot Gazetto suggested to her out of vengeance, he realizes his debauchery has led to the destruction of his kingdom. He refuses to continue Tormiella's courtship and asks her to go back to her shoemaker. Finally, in a twist of tale, he discovers that the Queen and his brother are still alive. His brother repents and everybody is forgiven.

The courtship of Tormiella by the King presents many similarities with that of Jane Shore by Edward IV in Thomas Heywood's King Edward IV.
