= Cecilia Crofts =

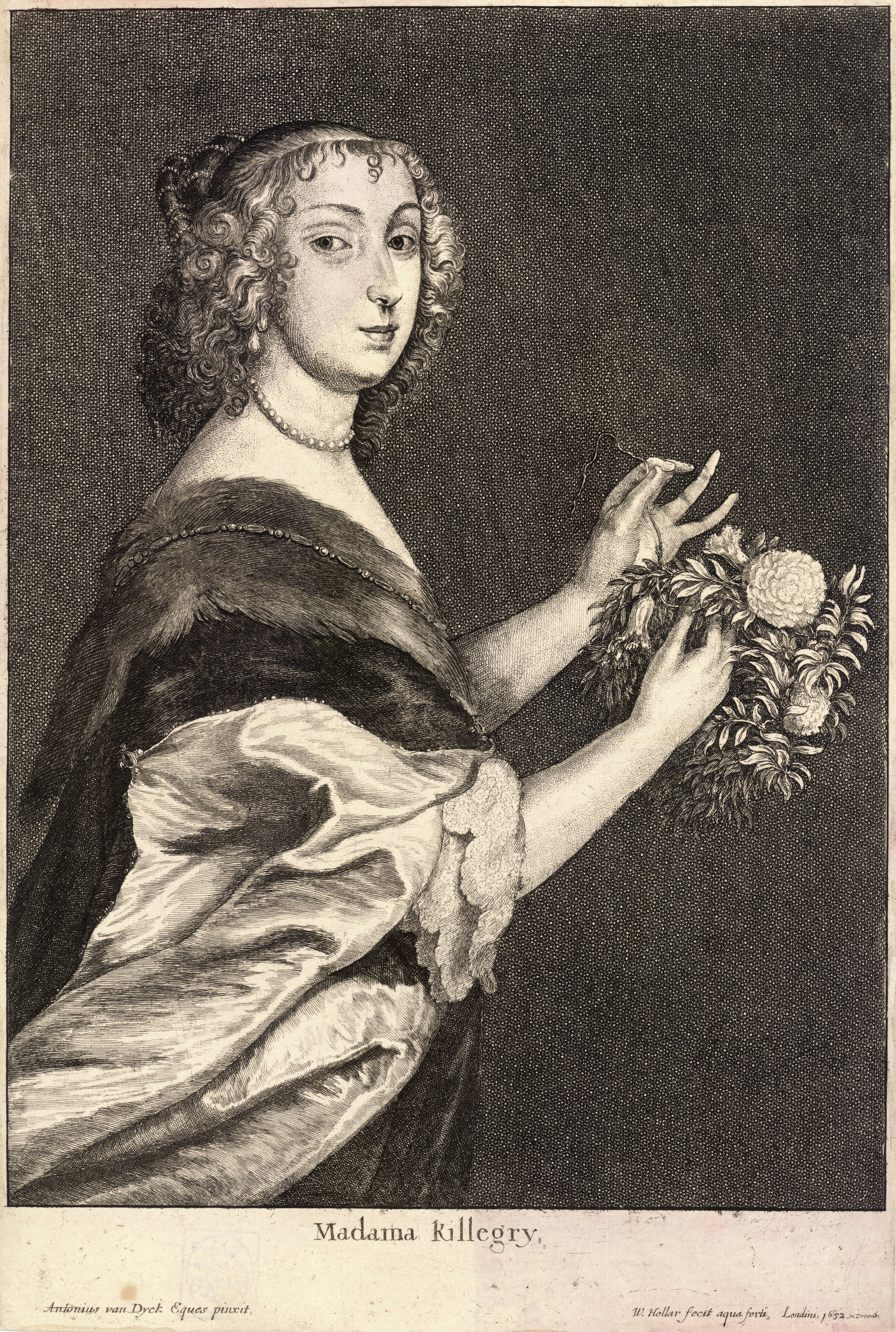
Cecilia Killigrew, after a portrait by Antony van Dyck

Cecilia Crofts (died 1638), was an English courtier, maid of honour to Henrietta Maria, and the subject of poems.

== Life ==
Cecilia Crofts was the sixth daughter of Sir John Crofts (1563-1628) of Little Saxham, Suffolk, and Mary Shirley daughter of Sir Thomas Shirley of Witneston or Wiston. Her eldest brother was Henry Crofts.

King James I was entertained by Sir John Crofts at Little Saxham with a masque and in February 1620 the "fair sisters" put on or planned another masque for Shrove Tuesday "of their own invention". There was a masque for the king at Little Saxham in December 1621. A masque text survives, known as "The Vision of the Nine Goddesses" performed by the eight Croft sisters including Cecilia Crofts, Dorothy, Lady Bennet, and Anne Crofts, Lady Wentworth. Each of the goddesses was introduced by a verse sung an actor playing Apollo, but the text does not say which sister played which goddess.

Around this time Simonds d'Ewes recorded a rumour that the king had married "Sissilia Crafts", a woman he might have married himself, if he had the means. King James had given one of Sir John Croft's unmarried daughters, probably Cecilia, a carcanet or necklace worth £500 on Shrove Tuesday 1620. James denied the rumour in March 1622, declaring he was "King of the most lying nation in the world".

In 1631 she competed with Richard Forster to gain the profits and rents of four coal mines at Benwell, Newcastle upon Tyne; Stumple Wood Head, Crossflatt, Goreflat, and Meadow Fields. Her brother Anthony Crofts and Lord Goring assisted her successful counter-petition. Forster had to settle with Sir Peter Riddell of Gateshead, the entrepreneur who owned the mines.

Cecilia Crofts took part in Walter Montagu's masque The Shepherd's Paradise at Somerset House in 1633. Sir Robert Ayton's poem, Upon Platonic Love: To Mistress Cicely Crofts: Maid of Honour, has been connected with the treatment of neo-Platonism in Montagu's masque, but may have been written in earlier years.

In 1636 she married Thomas Killigrew a courtier and playwright, son of Robert Killigrew and Mary Woodhouse.

Killigrew wrote that Thomas Carew, a gentleman of the king's chamber, composed a song Jealousy: A Dialogue, after seeing them argue before their wedding, and it was performed in a masque at Whitehall Palace in 1633. Killigrew included the poem in his closet drama Cicilia and Clorinda first published in 1664. Carew also wrote a poem on their wedding, On the Marriage of T. K. and C. C., the morning stormie.

Her nephew William Crofts, known as "mad cap Crofts", was master of horse to Henrietta Maria. His brother was shot in the head by Jeffrey Hudson, the queen's court dwarf, in a duel in France in 1644.

She died on 1 January 1638, leaving a son Henry or Harry Killigrew, baptised 16 April 1637 at St Martin-in-the-Fields. He married Mary Savage, daughter of John Savage, 2nd Earl Rivers and died in 1705.

== Legacy ==
Her portrait by Anthony van Dyck was engraved by Wenceslaus Hollar.

Francis Quarles wrote an elegy, Sighes at the contemporary deaths of those incomparable sisters, the Countesse of Cleaveland, and Mistrisse Cicily Killegrue, daughters of Sir Iohn Crofts Knight of Saxom Hall, in the Countie of Suffolke deceased, and his noble lady now living. Breathed forth by F.Q. (London, 1640).
