= Peacock Theatre =

West End theatre in London

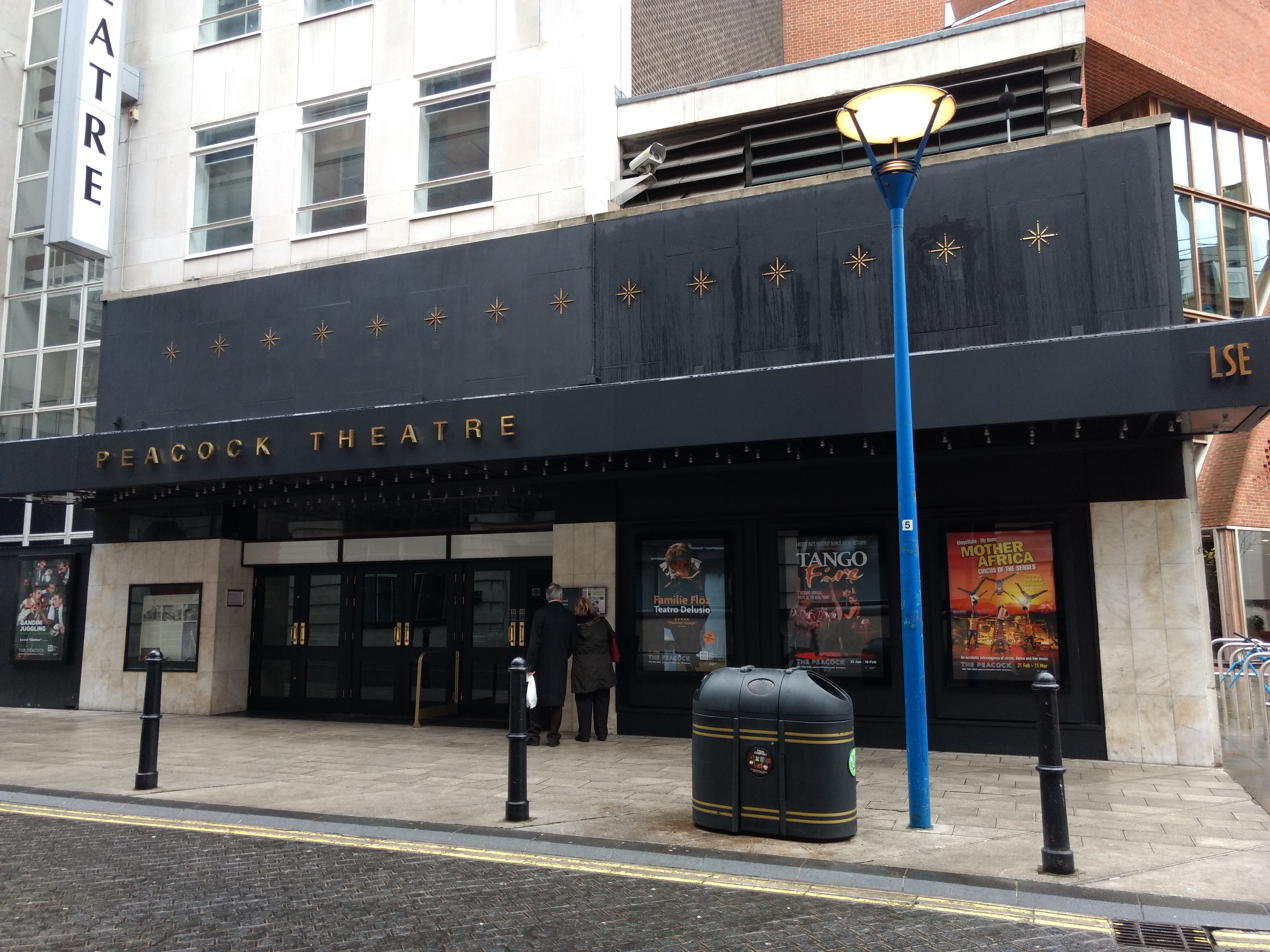
- Peacock Theatre in 2017
- Interactive map of Peacock Theatre
- Address: Kingsway; London, WC2; United Kingdom
- Coordinates: 51.514444°N 0.118056°W
- Owner: London School of Economics
- Capacity: 999
- Current use: Also a lecture theatre
- Production: Sadler's Wells productions in repertory
- Public transit: Holborn

Construction
- Opened: 13 November 1911; 114 years ago
- Rebuilt: 1960
- Architect: Bertie Crewe

Website
- http://www.peacocktheatre.com

The Peacock Theatre (previously the Royalty Theatre) is a West End theatre in the City of Westminster, located in Portugal Street, near Aldwych. The 987-seat house is owned by, and comprises part of the London School of Economics and Political Science campus, who use the theatre for lectures, public talks, conferences, political speeches and open days.

The university has a long lease with London's principal centre for contemporary dance, Sadler's Wells, with whom it has negotiated a deal to bring in dance companies under the banner 'Sadler's Wells in the West End'. The venue often plays host to dance performances, conferences, ballet, pop concerts and award ceremonies. The stage is approximately 36 feet (11 m) by 33 feet (10 m).

== History ==
=== Former theatres ===
A theatre has stood on the site since the 17th century. Known as Gibbon's Tennis Court, as it was built on a tennis-court site, and opened by Sir William D'Avenant. It was also known as the Vere Street Theatre.

Mrs Hughes became the first (identified) woman to tread the boards of a London theatre, on 8 December 1660, in a performance of Othello. The company left the theatre in 1663 and there is no record of further plays at the theatre.

The building was used as a drama school, from 1663-1671. It was used as a Nonconformist meeting house from 1675-82. Before being destroyed by fire in 1809 it had been a carpenter's shop, a slaughterhouse and a tripe-boiling house.

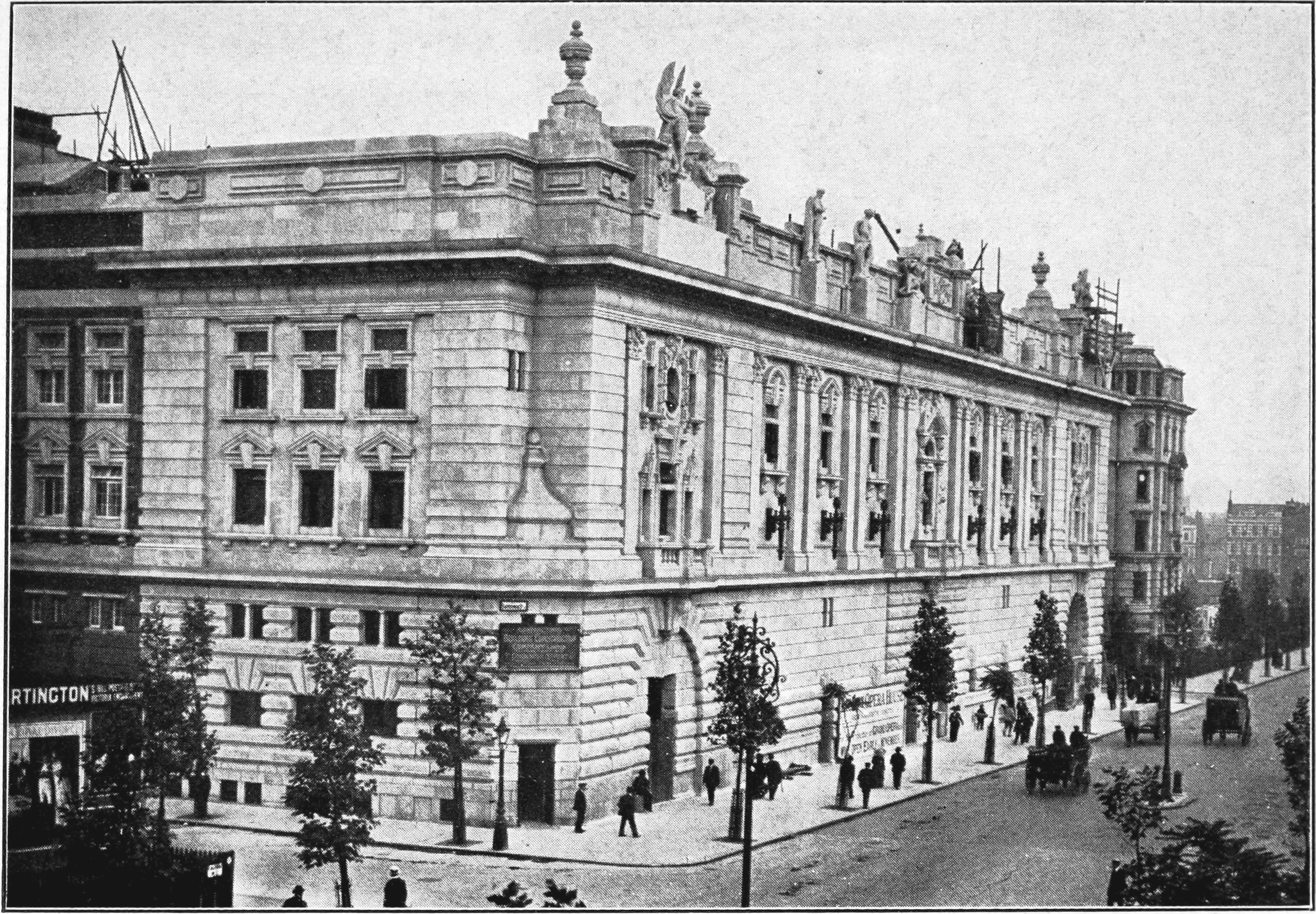
Oscar Hammerstein's London Opera House

At the beginning of the 20th century, the creation of Aldwych and Kingsway, linking High Holborn and Aldwych, destroyed a number of established London playhouses and the site between Portugal Street and Sardinia Street became available. A New York-based theatre impresario, Oscar Hammerstein I, (the grandfather of Oscar Hammerstein II) commissioned Bertie Crewe to build a new theatre in the Beaux-Arts style. The theatre opened on 13 November 1911 as the London Opera House. It had an approximately 45 feet (13.7 m) by 78 feet (23.8 m) stage, and a capacity of 2,660.

The London Opera House opened with the first performance in England of Quo Vadis? by Jean Nouguès. Other novelties were Massenet's Don Quichotte and The Children of Don, by T. E. Ellis (otherwise Lord Howard de Walden), and Joseph Holbrooke, both of whom, according to one critic, "showed a want of perception of stage requirements fatal to the success of the work". Revivals of old Italian operas such as Norma, William Tell, and La favorita proved unsuccessful, as did productions of French operas, including several more by Massenet. The Stage Year Book commented, "Londoners have practically no curiosity concerning operatic novelties or fresh artists, and they have never shown any predilection for the works of Massenet, on whom Mr Hammerstein so greatly relied".

Hammerstein could not secure the artists and operas most popular in London as the Royal Covent Garden Syndicate was able to do, and as his prices were the same as those of the rival company, operagoers mostly favoured the older house. Hammerstein lost £40,000 (equivalent of £5m in current terms) during his first and only season. He leased the theatre – described by The Stage Year Book as "a monument of misdirected energy ... hopeless from its inception" – to a French producer who reopened it as a variety house.

In May 1915 the theatre hosted Vladimir Rosing's Allied Opera Season. Rosing presented the English premiere of Tchaikovsky's The Queen of Spades and introduced Tamaki Miura as Madama Butterfly, the first Japanese singer to be cast in that role.

The theatre was purchased by Oswald Stoll in 1916 and renamed the Stoll Theatre and, for a time, as the Stoll Picture Theatre, housing cine-variety until the 1950s. Rose-Marie played at the Stoll Theatre in 1942, followed by Kismet and Stars on Ice in 1947. The London transfer of a version of George Gershwin's Porgy and Bess that restored it to an operatic form, took place here on 9 October 1952. Joan of Arc at the Stake was produced in 1954, starring Ingrid Bergman. The theatre closed on 4 August 1957, and was demolished for the construction of an office block.

=== Current building ===
The present, smaller theatre was built and christened The Royalty Theatre in 1960, located on the ground level of an office building. It was the first West End theatre to be built since the Saville Theatre in 1931. The first production was of a Friedrich Dürrenmatt play, The Visit, with Alfred Lunt and Lynn Fontanne. In March 1961 it hosted William Gibson's play about Helen Keller, The Miracle Worker.

Later in 1961 MGM leased the theatre to continue the run of the film Ben Hur following closure of the Empire, Leicester Square for rebuilding. This ran from 29 May 1961 to 6 May 1962, after which the theatre was closed until 19 November 1962 when Mutiny on the Bounty opened. This ran until 10 July 1963, and following a few weeks of revivals (Quo Vadis and Gigi) MGM closed the theatre on 3 August.

The lease was taken over by the Cinerama Corporation and the theatre was then equipped for screening three-strip Cinerama films becoming London's third Cinerama theatre (the others being the Casino Cinerama and the Coliseum Cinerama). The first presentation was The Wonderful World of the Brothers Grimm which transferred from the Coliseum on 27 November 1963. A compilation film entitled The Best of Cinerama ran for eleven weeks from 22 March 1964, after which the theatre was converted to 70mm single lens Cinerama to take over the run of It's a Mad Mad Mad Mad World from the Coliseum on 16 July. The theatre only premièred one Cinerama film, The Golden Head, which opened on 8 April 1965 and ran until 29 July. From 30 July The Greatest Story Ever Told transferred from the Casino Cinerama and ran until 27 October. From the 29 October, The Royalty commenced a run of My Fair Lady which was still showing at the Warner Leicester Square. This ended on 29 June 1966 to be followed by a revival of Mediterranean Holiday until 7 August when Cinerama pulled out and the theatre closed.

The lease was taken over by Gala Film Distributors and the Royalty reopened on 1 December with the X-rated Swedish film Night Games. Gala continued with a combination of foreign films and mainstream revivals until 19 December 1969 when the theatre closed as a cinema for the last time and returned to live theatre use. The Royalty Theatre's only successes were a run of the hit Oh! Calcutta! and a hit production of Bubbling Brown Sugar in the late 1970s. Spectacular 'follies' style shows and 'drag' shows did not find an audience, and the theatre became used as a TV studio for This Is Your Life, but was later bought by the London School of Economics and renamed the Peacock Theatre.

When Sadler's Wells determined to build its new theatre in 1996, the company moved to the Peacock Theatre. After the new Sadler's Wells Theatre opened in 1998, the Peacock became a dance venue for the company. The Rat Pack played at the theatre in 2002, and Doldrum Bay premièred here in 2003. The house is now shared between the London School of Economics (during the day) and Sadler's Wells evening dance productions.

The Peacock Theatre is noted as the home of one of the West End's most unusual ghosts, a dolphin commonly known as 'Flipper'. An urban myth has grown up that, during one of Paul Raymond's revues at the theatre in the 1970s, a dolphin was kept in a tank beneath the stage, where it lived permanently and later died from neglect. In fact, this is not true. Two dolphins called 'Pennie' and 'Pixie' were indeed kept in a tank at the theatre for three months for a show called 'The Royalty Folies', which was later renamed 'The Great International Nude Show'. However, neither of these animals died while at the theatre and at the close of the show the animals were moved to a dolphinarium in the East Asia.

The remnants of the tank and its lifting equipment still remain below the stage and numerous visitors to the theatre claim to have heard in the vicinity a spectral squeaking, not unlike a crying baby. One possible explanation is that the London Underground Piccadilly line Aldwych spur used to pass very close to the sub-stage areas of the theatre and it is noise from the tunnels that created the sound.

In March 2026, the theatre closed temporarily with immediate effect, due to an unspecified issue requiring essential repairs.

== See also ==
- List of London theatres
- List of West End musicals
- List of notable musical theatre productions
- Musical theatre

== Sources ==
- Carson, Lionel, ed. (1914). The Stage Year Book. London: Carson & Comerford. OCLC 1376723700.
- Martin, George (1979). The Opera Companion to Twentieth Century Opera. New York: Dodd, Meade. ISBN 0-71-954685-0.
- Williams, Gordon (2003). British Theatre in The Great War. New York: Continuum. ISBN 978-0-82-645635-9.
