= 1664 in literature =

This article presents lists of the literary events and publications in 1664.

== Events ==
- February – London publisher John Twyn is hanged, drawn and quartered, having been convicted of treason for distributing seditious literature.
- April 6 – Moses ben Isaac Bonems is the first signatory of the approbations to works given by the members of the Council of Four Lands at the Gramnitza (candlestick) fair.
- May 12 – Molière's comedy Tartuffe is performed in its original version as part of "The Pleasures of the Enchanted Island" at the court of King Louis XIV to mark the start of construction of the Palace of Versailles, but objections to its presentation of a hypocritical religious impostor ban it from later public presentation.
- June – Gazzetta di Mantova is first published in Mantua, Italy. By 2009 it will be the world's oldest private newspaper still published, and the oldest one continuously published in print.
- June 20 – Racine's tragedy La Thébaïde receives its first performance, by Molière's troupe at the Théâtre du Palais-Royal (rue Saint-Honoré) in Paris.
- October – Thomas Killigrew and the King's Company stage Killigrew's The Parson's Wedding with an all-female cast. (Killigrew attempts a similar all-female production of his play Thomaso, although this is never achieved.)
- November 5 – Sir William Davenant's "dramatic opera" Macbeth, adapted from Shakespeare's play, is performed for the first time.

== New books ==
=== Prose ===
- Margaret Cavendish, Duchess of Newcastle –
  - Sociable Letters
  - Philosophical Letters
- René Descartes – Traité de l'homme et de la formation du foetus
- John Evelyn – Sylva, or A Discourse of Forest-Trees and the Propagation of Timber
- Richard Flecknoe – A Discourse of the English Stage
- John Heydon
  - Psonthonpanchia
  - Theomagia, Part 3
- Lucy Hutchinson – Memoirs Of The Life Of Colonel Hutchinson
- Philippe Labbe - Bibliotheca bibliothecarum
- Jeremy Taylor – Dissuasive from Popery
- Izaak Walton – The Compleat Angler, 3rd edition
- Francisco Manuel de Melo – Obras morales

=== Drama ===
- Pedro Calderon de la Barca – La hija del aire
- Roger Boyle, 1st Earl of Orrery – Henry V
- Lodowick Carlell – Heraclius, Emperor of the East published (adapted from Corneille's Heraclius)
- Sir William Davenant – The Rivals (an adaptation of The Two Noble Kinsmen)
- Pierre Corneille – Othon
- John Dryden – The Rival Ladies
- John Dryden and Sir Robert Howard – The Indian Queen
- George Etherege – The Comical Revenge or, Love in a Tub
- Edward Howard – The Usurper
- Thomas Killigrew – Comedies and Tragedies (collected plays)
- William Killigrew – Ormasdes, or Love and Friendship, Pandora, or the Converts and Selindra (published together in one folio volume)
- John Lacy – The Old Troop
- Molière – Tartuffe
- Katherine Philips (died June 22) – Translation of Corneille's Horace (unfinished)
- Thomas Porter – The Carnival
- Jean Racine – La Thébaide
- William Shakespeare – Second impression of the Third Folio, adding seven plays to the 36 of the First Folio and Second: Pericles, Prince of Tyre and six works from Shakespeare Apocrypha
- Joost van den Vondel – Adam in Ballingschap
- John Wilson
  - Andronicus Comnenius
  - The Projectors

=== Poetry ===
- Samuel Butler – Hudibras Part 2
- Katherine Philips – Poems by the Incomparable Mrs. K.P.

== Births ==
- January 24 (baptised) – Sir John Vanbrugh, English dramatist and architect (died 1726)
- July 21 (or 23) – Matthew Prior, English poet and diplomat (died 1721)
- November 9 – Henry Wharton, English writer and librarian (died 1695)
- Probable year of birth
  - Charles Hopkins, Anglo-Irish poet and dramatist (died 1700)
  - William Mountfort, English actor and dramatist (died 1692)

== Deaths ==
- January 10 – Nicholas Culpeper, English herbalist, physician and astrologer (born 1616)
- January 20 – Isaac Ambrose, English Puritan writer (born 1604)
- June 22 – Katherine Philips (Orinda), English poet, translator and woman of letters (born 1632)
- July 16 – Andreas Gryphius, German lyric poet and dramatist (born 1616)
- August 16 – James Heath, English Royalist historian (born 1629)
- August 23 – Jean Bagot, Jesuit theologian (born 1591)
- November 18 – Nikola Zrinski, Croatian/Hungarian military leader, statesman and poet (born 1620)
- Unknown date – Qian Qianyi (銭謙益), Chinese poet and social historian (born 1582)
- Probable year of death – Henry Robinson, merchant and writer (born c. 1604)
