= The Rival Ladies =

Restoration tragicomedy by Dryden

- Original language: English
- Written by: John Dryden
- Genre: Tragicomedy

Premiere
- Date: June 1664
- Place: Theatre Royal, London

The Rival Ladies is a 1664 tragicomedy by the English writer John Dryden. It was originally performed by the King's Company at the Theatre Royal then in Brydges Street. Dryden dedicated the published version to the Irish politician and playwright the Earl of Orrery.

== Bibliography ==
- Van Lennep, W. The London Stage, 1660-1800: Volume One, 1660-1700. Southern Illinois University Press, 1960.
