= Reuben Bourne =

English dramatist

Reuben Bourne (fl. 1692), was an English dramatist.

Bourne belonged to the Middle Temple, and left behind him a comedy which has never been acted. The title of this is 'The Contented Cuckold, or Woman's Advocate,' 4to, 1692. Its scene is Edmonton, and the principal character, Sir Peter Lovejoy, contends that a cuckold is one of the scarcest of created beings.
