= Josephus Adjutus =

17th-century Assyrian theologian

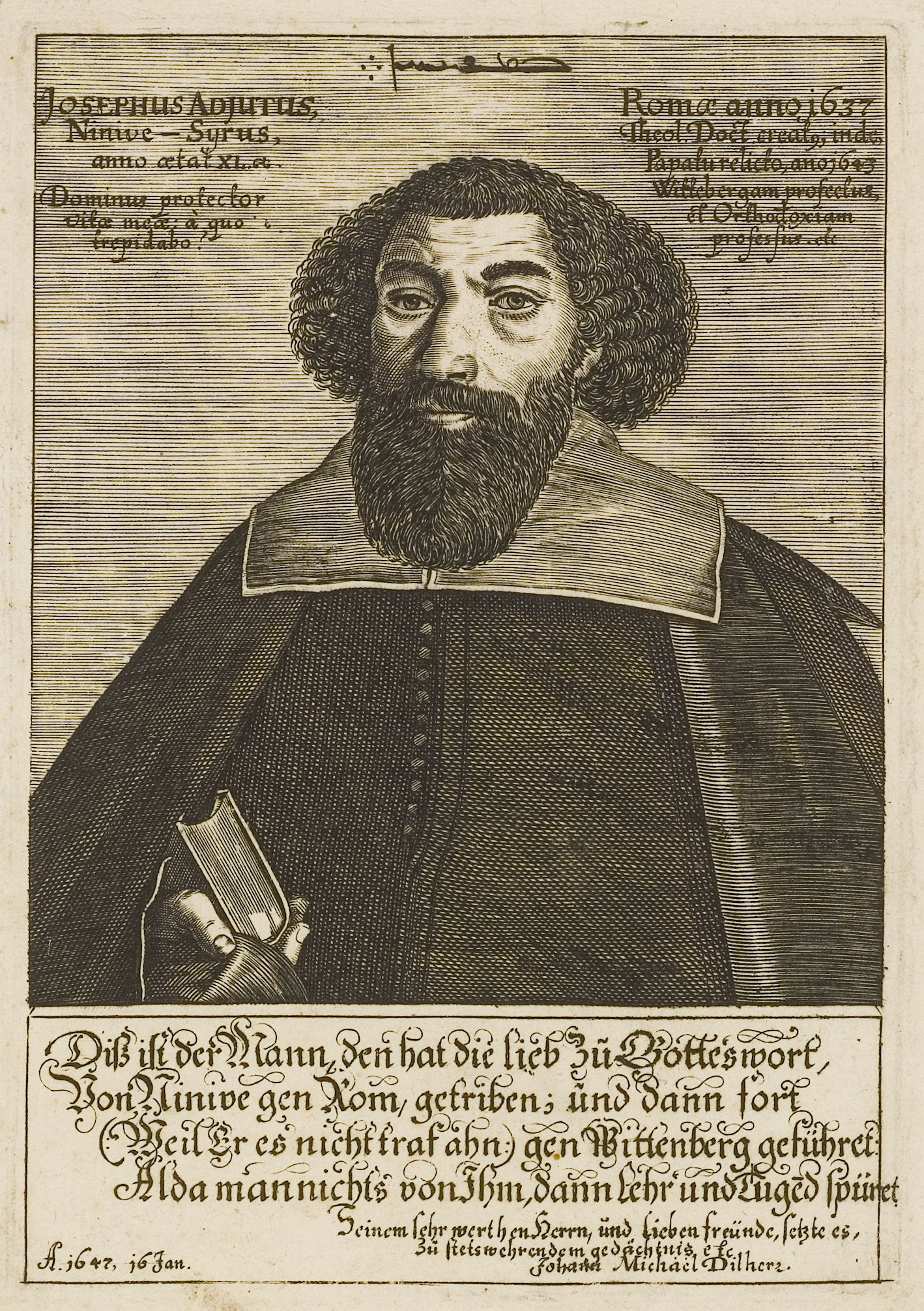
Josephus Adjutus on a 1647 woodcut by Johann Michael Dilherz

Josephus Adjutus (Arabic: يوسيفوس أجستوس, romanized: Yusayfus 'Ajsatus; c. 1602 – May 21, 1668) was a famous Assyrian theologian. He advanced fundamental theories on religion during the Reformation, and criticized corruption in the Catholic Church.

== Biography ==
Josephus was born in the city of Mosul, in present-day Iraq. He had apparently come from a family of Chaldean Catholics. After his parents died in 1606, relatives sent Josephus to be brought up in Jerusalem. Until 1613, he lived and was educated in Palestine in a monastery of the Friars Minor, a Franciscan Order. He was made a Deacon in 1632 under Pope Urban VIII. Five years later, in 1637, he earned the title of Doctor of Theology at the Collegium Bononiensis in Bologna. After periods in Vienna, Prague and Dresden, he moved to Wittenberg, which he saw as the "new Jerusalem". Above all, in Wittenberg, he turned against the Catholic Church.

On October 23, 1643, in the Grand Auditorium of Wittenberg University, Adjutus gave his Oratio-revocatoria, a declaration of renunciation of the Roman Church. He denounced the contention of the Roman Catholic Church that Scripture does not contain everything necessary for healing. The Church of the time believed it necessary to explore the mysteries of faith allowed by the Bible.

Adjutus criticized the Catholic reverence for the rule of the Pope, which he saw as a source of errors and an impediment to the understanding of the Word of God. He accused the Catholic Church of three main sins:

1. Contempt for the Holy Scripture
2. Erroneous beliefs
3. The tyranny of church superiors

Adjutus was made a professor of theology, and remained at Wittenberg until his death.

== Publications ==
- Oratio de potestate episcopi Josefi Adjuti. Wittenberg 1646
- Serenissimo et potentissimo principi ac domino: Domino Frideresco Wilhelmo, Marchioni Brandenburgensis. Wittenberg 1650

== Literature ==
- Burchard Brentjes:Adjutus Josephus, the Chaldeans to Wittenberg. In:Scientific. Zeitschr. d. Martin-Luther-Univ. Halle-Wittenberg: Ges - u. sprachwissenschaftl. R.. Volume 26, 1977, issue 4, pages pp 131–138.
- Heinrich Kuehne and Heinz Motel:Famous people and their connection to Wittenberg. Publisher Göttinger Tageblatt, 1990, ISBN 3-924781-17-6
