= Gibbon's Tennis Court =

Coordinates: 51°30′52″N 0°07′05″W

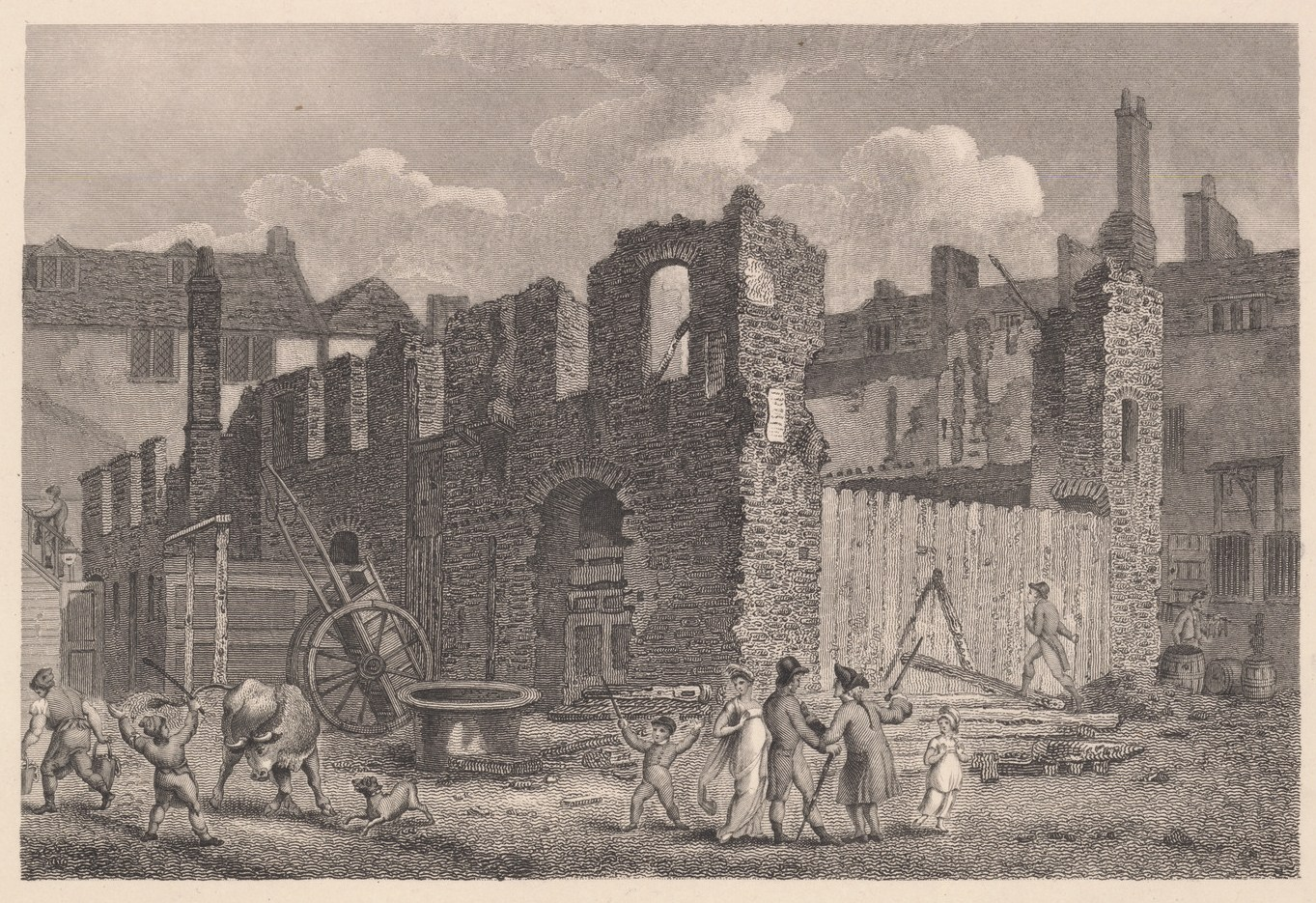
Remains of Gibbon's Tennis Court, after a fire in 1809

Gibbon's Tennis Court was a building off Vere Street and Clare Market, near Lincoln's Inn Fields in London, England. Originally built as a real tennis court, it was used as a playhouse from 1660 to 1663, shortly after the English Restoration. As a theatre, it has been variously called the "Theatre Royal, Vere Street", the "Vere Street Theatre", or (as in Samuel Pepys' diary) simply "The Theatre". It was the first permanent home for Thomas Killigrew's King's Company and was the stage for some of the earliest appearances by professional actresses.

The theatre was destroyed by fire in 1809. The London School of Economics, which covers most of Clare Market nowadays, retains some squash and real tennis courts in its older buildings.

== Tennis-court theatres ==
Tudor-style real tennis courts were long, high-ceiling buildings, with galleries for spectators; their dimensions — about 75 by 30 feet — are similar to the earlier theatres, and much larger than a modern tennis court. The tennis courts were not used exclusively for tennis. In 1653, seven years before it saw lawful use as a theatre, an underground production of Killigrew's Claricilla was planned for Gibbon's court. The production was broken up before it debuted, reportedly betrayed to the army by one of the actors.

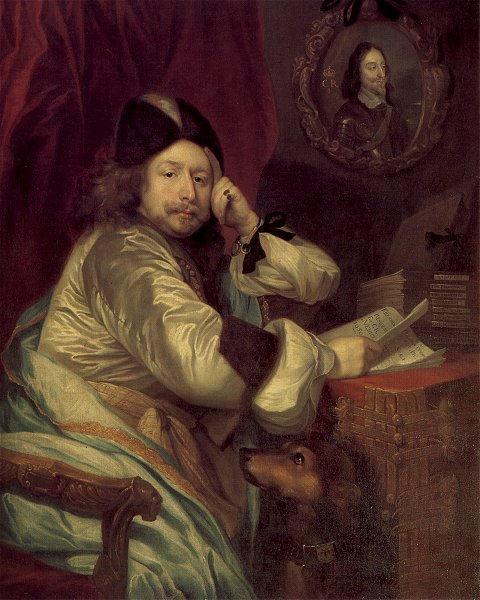
Thomas Killigrew's acting troupe performed in a remodeled Gibbon's Tennis Court from 1660 to 1663.

After the English Restoration in 1660, Charles II granted Letters Patent to two companies to perform "legitimate drama" in London: the Duke's Company under the patronage of the Duke of York, led by William Davenant, and the King's Company, led by Thomas Killigrew. Both companies briefly performed in the theatrical spaces that had survived the interregnum and civil war (including the Cockpit and the Red Bull), but scrambled to quickly acquire facilities that were more to current tastes. Killigrew and Davenant both chose a solution that had been used in France: converting tennis courts into theatres.

Killigrew's remodelled Gibbon's Tennis Court opened first, on 8 November 1660, just two months after being given permission by the Crown. The design was similar to the earlier Elizabethan-era "private" theatres, such as the theatre in Blackfriars: a stage devoid of scenery facing a bench-filled pit on the auditorium floor and surrounded by one or two levels of U-shaped galleries.

== Competition ==
Not long after the opening, on 20 November, avid theatre-goer Samuel Pepys attended his first performance at Vere Street:

…Mr. Shepley and I to the new Play-house near Lincoln’s-Inn-Fields (which was formerly Gibbon’s tennis-court), where the play of Beggar’s Bush was newly begun; and so we went in and saw it, it was well acted: and here I saw the first time one Moone, who is said to be the best actor in the world, lately come over with the King, and indeed it is the finest play-house, I believe, that ever was in England.

Pepys' high praise for the theatre is often taken to reflect his excitement regarding London's burgeoning theatrical scene rather than as commentary than on the quality of the tennis-court theatre itself. John Styan says it "seems a questionable statement about so makeshift a theatre." Killigrew's competition, Davenant, would take another seven months to open his new theatre in nearby Lisle's Tennis Court; working more from the model of court masque venues such as Inigo Jones’ Cockpit-in-Court, he equipped it with a stage complete with a proscenium arch and moveable scenery, painted onto a series of sliding panels. Opening in late June, 1661, Davenant's theatre would steal much of Vere Street's thunder.

Before then, though, Killigrew would generate some more excitement of his own, by being the first to stage plays with actresses, instead of actors, playing female roles. The first occasion, based on its newly-written prologue, is thought to have been a performance of Othello on 8 December 1660; authorities differ as to the name of the actress who played Desdemona. Pepys records a 3 January 1661 restaging of Beggar’s Bush as "the first time that ever I saw women come upon the stage."

After Davenant’s theatre in Lisle’s Tennis Court opened, Vere Street’s popularity waned. Pepys, 4 July 1661: "I went to the theatre [in Vere Street] and there I saw Claracilla (the first time I ever saw it), well acted. But strange to see this house, that use to be so thronged, now empty since the opera begun—and so will continue for a while I believe." To remain competitive, Killigrew decided to construct a purpose-built theatre more to modern tastes. On 7 May 1663, just two-and-a-half years after the theatre in Lisle's Tennis Court opened, the King's Company moved to the new Theatre Royal in Bridges Street.

According to an 1811 Robert Wilkinson image, Gibbon's Tennis Court was destroyed by fire on 17 September 1809. In the 20th century, the Stoll Theatre and the Peacock Theatre would be built at the same site.
