= 1692 in literature =

This article contains information about the literary events and publications of 1692.

== Events ==
- November
  - Nahum Tate becomes Poet Laureate of England.
  - Thomas Rymer is made Historiographer Royal, and mounts a major effort to preserve and publish historical documents.
- December 9 – Playwright William Mountfort is attacked in a London street and stabbed; he dies the next day.

== New books ==
=== Prose ===
- Richard Ames – The Jacobite Coventicle, Sylvia's Complaint, of Her Sexes Unhappiness (in answer to Robert Gould)
- Madame d'Aulnoy – Histoire de Jean de Bourbon, Prince de Carency (The Prince of Carency)
- Richard Baxter – Paraphrase on the Psalms of David
- Richard Bentley – three "confutations" of Atheism and The Folly of Atheism, and (what is now called) Deism
- Gilbert Burnet – A Discourse on the Pastoral Care
- William Congreve – Incognita; or, Love and Duty Reconcil'd: A novel
- Anne Conway, Viscountess Conway – The Principles of the Most Ancient and Modern Philosophy
- John Dryden – Eleonara
- Roger L'Estrange – Fables, of Aesop and other Eminent Mythologists
- Edmund Gibson (ed.) – Chronicon Saxonicum
- Ihara Saikaku – Reckonings That Carry Men Through the World
- Ben Jonson (died 1637) – Third folio collection of the Works
- John Locke – Some Considerations of the Consequences of the Lowering of Interest and Raising the Value of Money
- George Savile, 1st Marquess of Halifax – Maxims of State
- Sir William Temple – Memoirs of What Past in Christendom: From the war begun in 1672 to the peace concluded 1679
- William Walsh – Letters and Poems, Amorous and Gallant
- Anthony à Wood – Athenae Oxonienses, vol. ii
- Nicolás Antonio – Bibliotheca Hispana Vetus

=== Drama ===
- Reuben Bourne – The Contented Cuckold, or Woman's Advocate
- Nicholas Brady – The Rape, or the Innocent Impostors
- John Crowne – Regulus
- John Dryden (with Thomas Southerne) – Cleomenes, the Spartan Hero
- Thomas D'Urfey – The Marriage-Hater Matched
- William Mountfort – Henry II
- Elkanah Settle – The Fairy-Queen, an adaptation of A Midsummer Night's Dream, with music by Henry Purcell
- Thomas Shadwell – The Volunteers

=== Poetry ===
- John Dennis, Poems in Burleseque
- Thomas Fletcher – Poems on Several Occasions
- Charles Gildon – Miscellany Poems upon Several Occasions
- Sor Juana Inés de la Cruz – Obras (second volume)
- Antonio de Solís y Rivadeneyra – Varias poesías sagradas y profanas

== Births ==
- February 25 Karl Ludwig von Pöllnitz, German adventurer and writer (died 1775)
- February 29 John Byrom, English poet (died 1763)
- April 5 Adrienne Lecouvreur, French actress (died 1730)
- May 18 Joseph Butler, theologian of the Church of England (died 1752)
- November 6 Louis Racine, French poet (died 1763)
- Unknown dates
  - Li E (厲鶚), Chinese poet (died 1752)
  - John Mottley, English dramatist, biographer and compiler of jokes (died 1750)

== Deaths ==
- By February – Sir George Etherege, English dramatist (born c. 1636)
- May 6 – Nathaniel Lee, English dramatist (born c. 1653)
- May 18/19 – Elias Ashmole, English antiquarian (born 1617)
- July 30 (buried) – Jacob Bauthumley, English radical religious writer (born 1613)
- September 21 – Ermes di Colorêt, Friulian nobleman and poet (born 1622)
- November 6 – Gédéon Tallemant des Réaux, French biographer (born 1619)
- November 19 – Thomas Shadwell, English Poet Laureate and playwright (born c. 1642)
- December 10 – William Mountfort, English dramatist and actor (born c. 1664)
- unknown date - Zera Yacob, Ethiopian philosopher (born 1599)
