= Thomas Killigrew =

English dramatist and theatre manager (1612–1683)

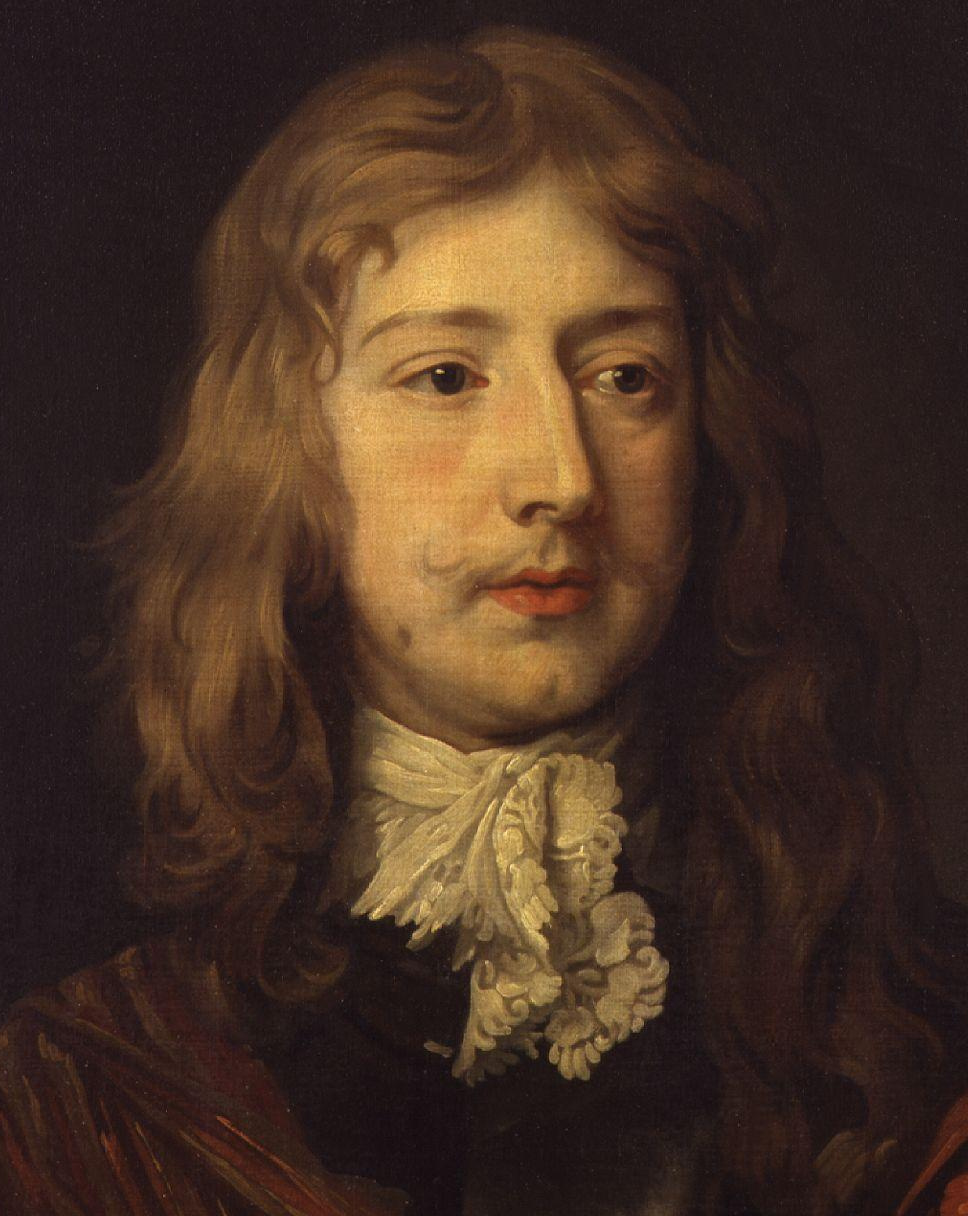
- Detail from a portrait of Thomas Killigrew by Anthony van Dyck, circa 1635
- Born: 7 February 1612; England
- Died: 19 March 1683 (aged 71); Whitehall, London, England
- Occupation: Dramatist

Thomas Killigrew (7 February 1612 – 19 March 1683) was an English dramatist and theatre manager. He was a witty, dissolute figure at the court of King Charles II of England.

== Life ==
Killigrew was one of twelve children of Sir Robert Killigrew of Hanworth, a courtier to James I, and his wife Mary née Woodhouse; he became a page to King Charles I at about the age of thirteen. According to Samuel Pepys, the boy Killigrew used to volunteer as an extra, or "devil," at the Red Bull Theatre, so that he could see the plays for free. The young Killigrew had limited formal education; the Court and the playhouse were his schoolroom.

Killigrew was present at the exorcism of the possessed nuns of Loudun. In 1635 he left a sceptical account of the proceedings.

Before the English Civil War, Killigrew wrote several plays—tragicomedies like Claricilla and The Prisoners, as well as his most popular play, The Parson's Wedding (1637). The latter play has been criticized for its coarse humour; but it also contains prose readings of John Donne's poetry to pique a literate audience.

A Royalist and Roman Catholic, Killigrew followed Prince Charles (the future Charles II) into exile in 1647. In the years 1649–51, he was in Paris, Geneva, and Rome, and in the later year was appointed Charles' representative in Venice. (It has been said that Killigrew wrote each of his plays in a different city; Thomaso, or the Wanderer was written in Madrid)

At the Restoration in 1660, Killigrew returned to England along with many other Royalist exiles. Charles rewarded his loyalty by making him Groom of the Bedchamber and Chamberlain to Queen Catherine. He had a reputation as a wit; in his famous Diary, Samuel Pepys wrote that Killigrew had the office of the King's fool and jester, with privilege to mock and revile even the most prominent without penalty Diary of Samuel Pepys, Thursday, 13 February 1668.

Along with Sir William Davenant, he was given a royal warrant to form a theatre company in 1660—which gave Killigrew a key role in the revival of English drama. Killigrew beat Davenant to a debut, at Gibbon's Tennis Court in Clare Market, with the new King's Company. Its original members were Michael Mohun, William Wintershall, Robert Shatterell, William Cartwright, Walter Clun, Charles Hart and Nicholas Burt. They played for a time at the old Red Bull Theatre, but in 1663 the company moved to the new Theatre Royal in Drury Lane. (Unfortunately, Killigrew gained a reputation as an incompetent manager; he was constantly in disputes with his actors and had to bribe his stars to keep working for him.) Killigrew staged plays by Aphra Behn, John Dryden, William Wycherley...and Thomas Killigrew, as well as revivals of Beaumont and Fletcher. Having inherited the rights and repertory of the old King's Men, the King's Company performed many of Shakespeare's works, in the rewritten forms that were so popular at the time and so disparaged later. Two Killigrew productions of his own Parson's Wedding, in 1664 and 1672-3, were cast entirely with women.

In 1673, Killigrew was appointed Master of the Revels. He lost control of his theatre in a conflict with his son Charles in 1677. (Charles, in turn, went bust a year later.) Thomas Killigrew died at Whitehall on 19 March 1683.

== Works ==
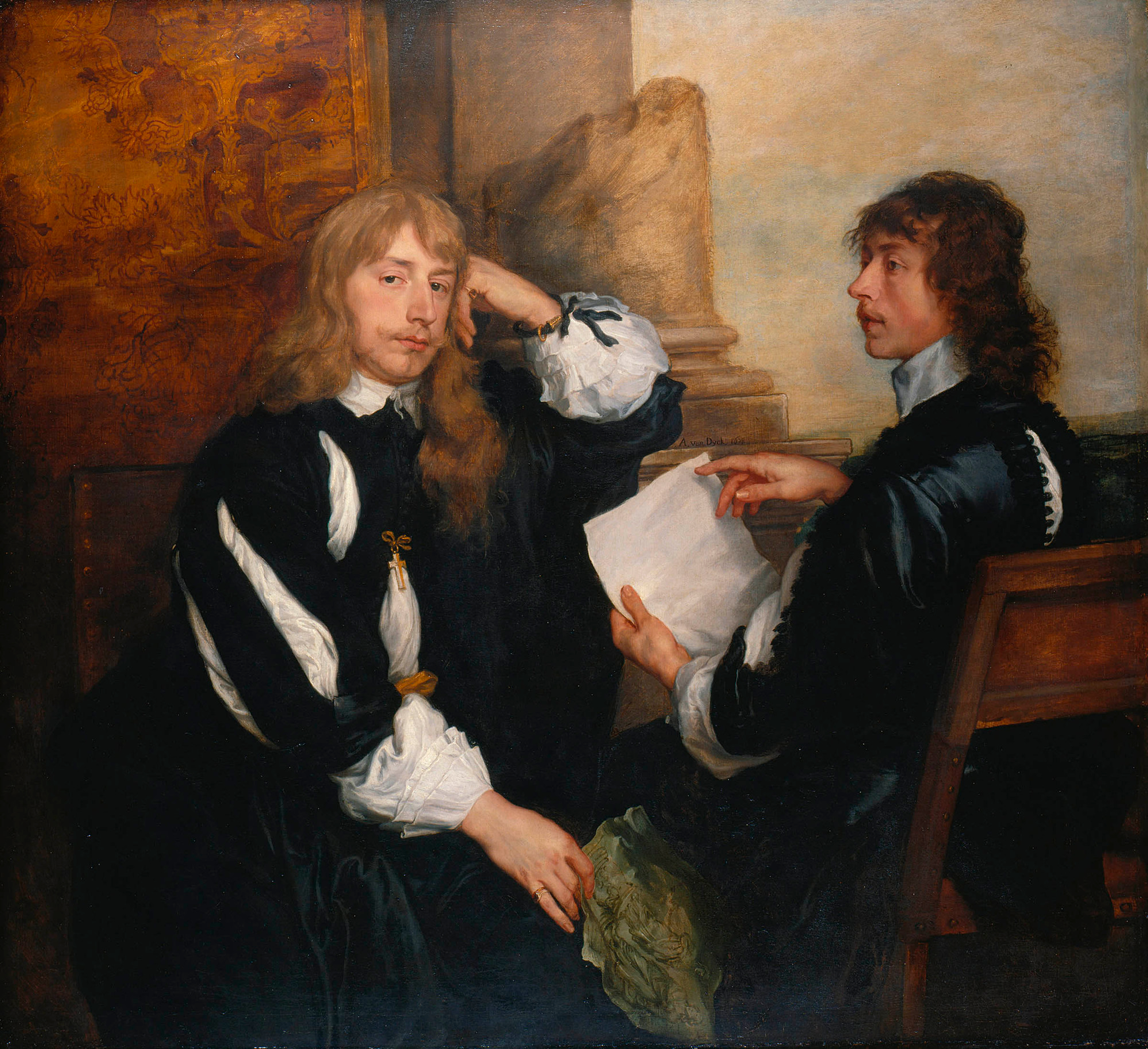
Thomas Killigrew and (possibly) Lord William Crofts by Anthony van Dyck

Thomas Killigrew's dramas are:

- The Prisoners (written c. 1632-5 in London; printed 1641)
- Claricilla (c. 1636, Rome; printed 1641)
- The Princess, or Love at First Sight (c. 1636; Naples)
- The Parson's Wedding (c. 1637; Basel, Switzerland)
- The Pilgrim (Paris)
- Bellamira Her Dream, or Love of Shadows (two-part play; Venice)
- Cicilia and Clorinda, or Love in Arms (two-part play; Cicilia, c. 1650, Turin; Clorinda, 1651, Florence)
- Thomaso, or the Wanderer (two-part play; Madrid).

In 1664, Henry Herringman published a collected edition of Killigrew's dramas, titled Comedies and Tragedies (rather inaccurately, since the majority of the plays are tragicomedies). Only his two earliest plays had been printed previously. The collected edition identifies the city in which Killigrew supposedly wrote each play.

The Parson's Wedding and Claricilla were successful stage plays. Of his last three works, Thomaso is a broad comedy based on Killigrew's experiences in European exile, while Bellamira and Cicillia are heroic romances—but all three are closet dramas, ten-act double plays never intended for the stage. Yet oddly enough, Aphra Behn adapted Thomaso for her successful The Rover (1677). The tragedy The Pilgrim, apparently never performed, borrows its plot from James Shirley's The Politician and reveals many allusions to Shakespeare.

Some critics have considered The Parson's Wedding to be a Restoration play written before the Restoration, an anticipation of what was to come—and Killigrew himself as a central figure in the transition from English Renaissance theatre to Restoration drama.

== Family ==
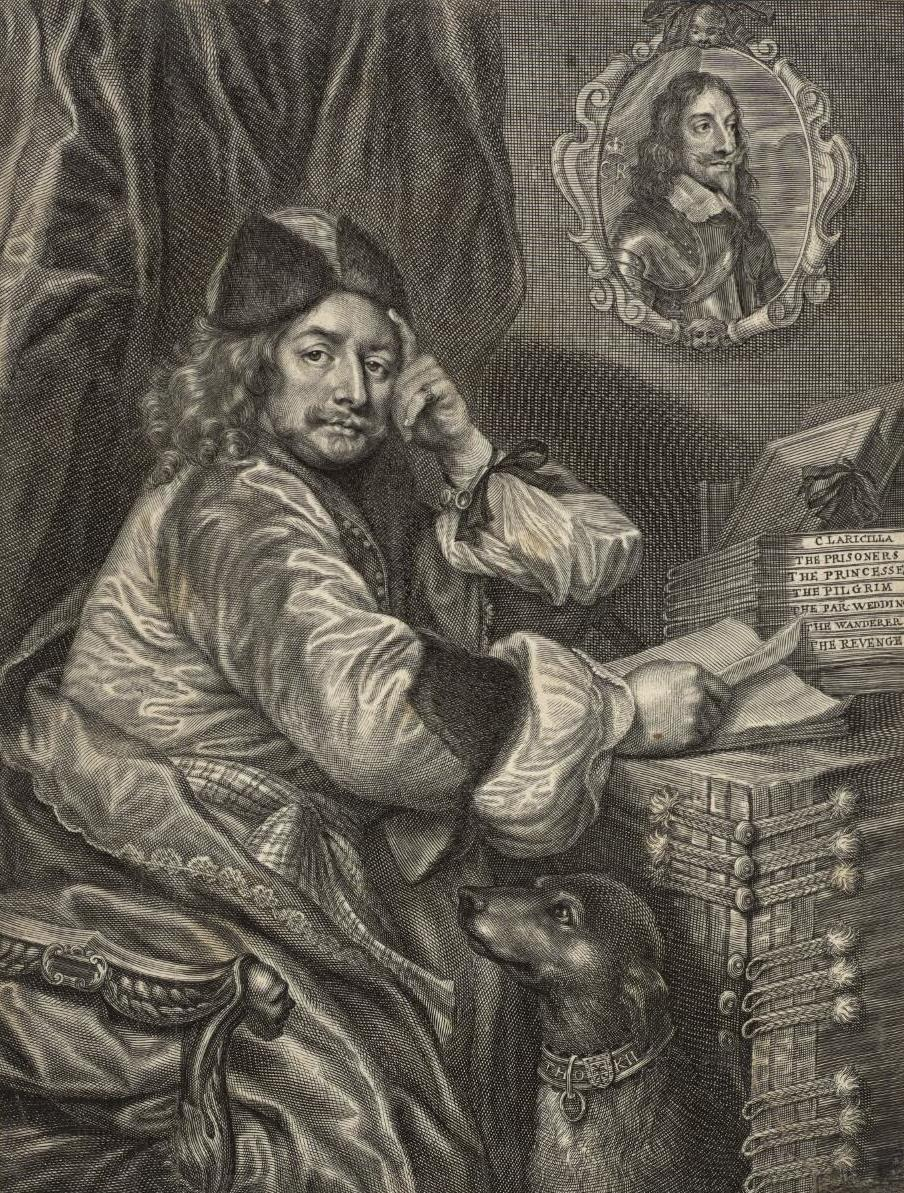
Print of Thomas Killigrew, after a portrait by William Sheppard

He married twice.

1 Cecilia Crofts (16?? –1638) in 1636, a maid of honour to Queen Henrietta Maria with a son:

- Henry Killigrew (bapt 16 April 1637 St Martin's-in-the-Fields)

2 Charlotte de Hesse (1629 –1716) in 1655; with children:

- Charles Killigrew (29 December 1655 – 1725)
- Thomas Killigrew (the younger) (1657 –1719), who had one successful play, called Chit-Chat (1719)
- Robert (Roger) Killigrew (born 17 September 1663)
- Elizabeth Killigrew (born 3 July 1666)

His second wife and their 3 sons were naturalised in an Act of Parliament in 1683.

== The other Killigrews ==
Among his 8 siblings known to have survived to adulthood, Thomas had two brothers who also wrote plays:

- Sir William Killigrew (1606–1695), was a Court official (vice chamberlain to the Queen) who wrote four plays: Selindra; Pandora; and Ormasdes, or Love and Friendship—all printed in 1664; and The Siege of Urbin (1666), generally considered his best work.
- Henry Killigrew (1613–1700), a clergyman, wrote only one play ... but he wrote it twice. His The Conspiracy was published in 1638, apparently pirated; he revised it into Pallantus and Eudora (1653). Henry was the father of the poet Anne Killigrew.

For the other six, see Robert Killigrew
