= Essay of Dramatick Poesie =

Essay by John Dryden

John Dryden's Essay of Dramatic Poesy (also Essay of Dramatick Poesie) was likely written in 1666 during the Great Plague of London and published in 1668. Dryden's claim in this essay was that poetic drama with English and Spanish influence is a justifiable art form when compared to traditional French poetry.

The treatise is a dialogue among four speakers: Eugenius, Crites, Lisideius, and Neander. The four speakers are Sir Robert Howard [Crites], Charles Sackville (then Lord Buckhurst) [Eugenius], Sir Charles Sedley [Lisedeius], and Dryden himself (Neander means "new man" and implies that Dryden, as a respected member of the gentry class, is entitled to join in this dialogue on an equal footing with the three older men who are his social superiors).

On the day that the English fleet encounters the Dutch at sea near the mouth of the Thames, the four friends take a barge downriver towards the noise from the battle. Rightly concluding, as the noise subsides, that the English have triumphed, they order the bargeman to row them back upriver as they begin a dialogue on the advances made by modern civilization. They agree to measure progress by comparing ancient arts with modern, focusing specifically on the art of drama (or "dramatic poesy").

The four men debate a series of three topics: (1) the relative merit of classical drama (upheld by Crites) vs. modern drama (championed by Eugenius); (2) whether French drama, as Lisideius maintains, is better than English drama (supported by Neander, who famously calls Shakespeare "the greatest soul, ancient or modern"); and (3) whether plays in rhyme are an improvement upon blank verse drama—a proposition that Neander, despite having defended the Elizabethans, now advances against the skeptical Crites (who also switches from his original position and defends the blank verse tradition of Elizabethan drama). Invoking the so-called unities from Aristotle's Poetics (as interpreted by Italian and refined by French scholars over the last century), the four speakers discuss what makes a play "a just and lively imitation" of human nature in action. This definition of a play, supplied by Lisideius/Sedley (whose rhymed plays had dazzled the court and were a model for the new drama), gives the debaters a versatile and richly ambiguous touchstone. To Crites' argument that the plots of classical drama are more "just," Eugenius can retort that modern plots are more "lively" thanks to their variety. Lisideius shows that the French plots carefully preserve Aristotle's unities of action, place, and time; Neander replies that English dramatists such as Ben Jonson also kept the unities when they wanted to, but that they preferred to develop character and motive. Even Neander's final argument with Crites over whether rhyme is suitable in drama depends on Aristotle's Poetics: Neander says that Aristotle demands a verbally artful ("lively") imitation of nature, while Crites thinks that dramatic imitation ceases to be "just" when it departs from ordinary speech—i.e. prose or blank verse.

A year later, the two brothers-in-law quarreled publicly over this third topic. See Dryden's "Defence of An Essay of Dramatic Poesy" (1669), where Dryden tries to persuade the rather literal-minded Howard that audiences expect a play to be an imitation of nature, not a surrogate for nature itself.

== Sources ==
- Williamson, George (1946). "The Occasion of "An Essay of Dramatic Poesy"". Modern Philology. 44 (1): 1–9. doi:10.1086/388699. JSTOR 435107. S2CID 161518782.
- Simon, Irène (1963). "Dryden's Revision of the Essay of Dramatic Poesy". The Review of English Studies. 14 (54): 132–141. doi:10.1093/res/XIV.54.132. JSTOR 513503.
