= Lodowick Carlell =

English playwright (1602–1675)

- Born: 1602
- Died: 1675 (aged 72–73)
- Occupations: Courtier, playwright
- Spouse: Joan Palmer

Signature
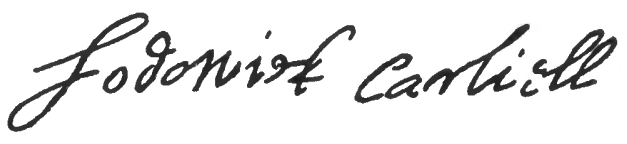

Lodowick Carlell (1602–1675), also Carliell or Carlile, was a seventeenth-century English playwright, active mainly during the Caroline era and the Commonwealth period.

== Courtier ==
Carlell's ancestry was Scottish. He was the son of Herbert Carlell of Bridekirk in Dumfriesshire, and the third of four brothers. He was not educated at university, though he did produce translations from French and Spanish during his lifetime; he probably had the informal though not always contemptible education of a courtier, which he was from about the age of 15.

In his extra-literary life, Carlell was a courtier and royal functionary; he held the offices of Gentleman of the Bows to King Charles I, and Groom to the King and Queen's Privy Chamber. He was also Keeper of the Great Forest at Richmond Park. In the latter post, he assisted the King in his frequent hunts, and throughout the 1630s he lived in the Park at Petersham Lodge. In this same period he accomplished most of his dramatic authorship – and his plays are notable for their forest scenes.

He maintained his post at Richmond Park throughout the English Civil War, down to 1649. In this period he may have acted as a sort of undercover agent for the Royalist cause; he is thought to have sheltered Lucy Hay, Countess of Carlisle during this time. During the English Interregnum he is thought to have remained Keeper of both Richmond Park and St. James's Park.

== Playwright ==
Carlell began his dramatic career by the late 1620s. His early plays were acted by the King's Men and Queen Henrietta's Men. Thomas Dekker dedicated his Match Me in London to Carlell in 1631.

His extant plays are: The Deserving Favourite (1629), The Fool Who Would be a Favourite (circa 1637) or The Discreet Lover (his most popular play), Osmond the Great Turk, or The Noble Servant (1638), Arviragus and Philicia, parts 1 and 2 (1639), The Passionate Lovers, Parts 1 and 2 (1655), and Heraclius, Emperor of the East (1664), the last a translation of the 1647 play by Pierre Corneille.

Some critics have judged his plays to be significant in the evolution of serious drama in the 17th century, from the tragedy and tragicomedy of John Fletcher and his collaborators to the "heroic drama" of the Restoration era. In this view, Carlell is "one of the chief intermediaries between Beaumont and Fletcher, and Dryden and Settle".

== Personal life ==
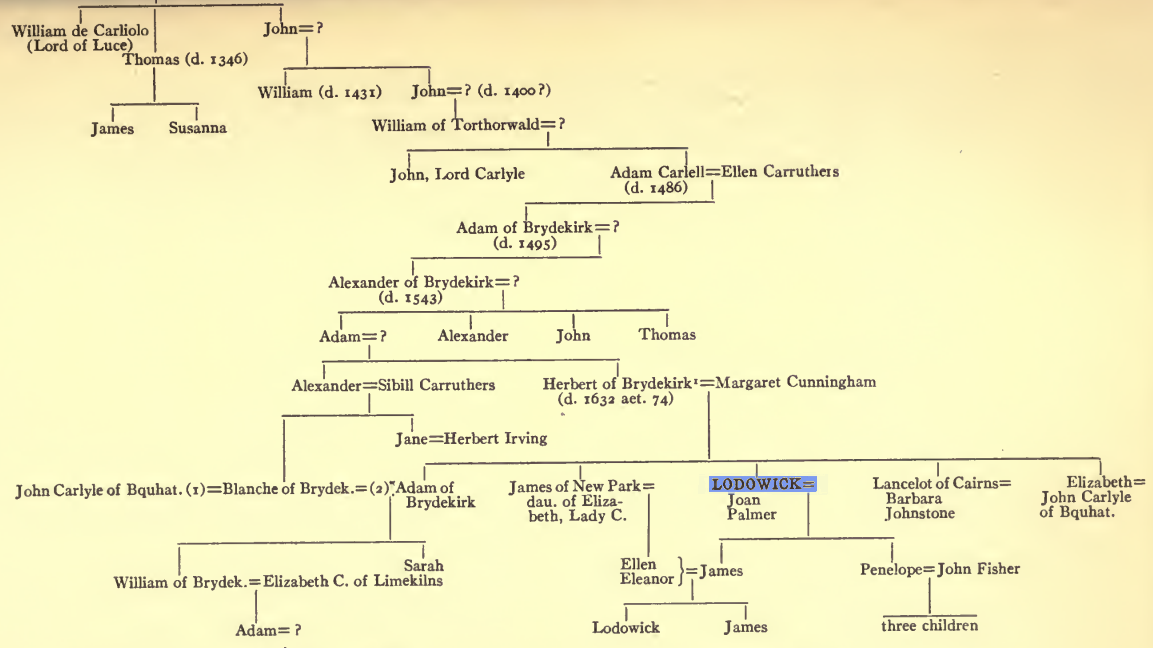
Lodowick Carlell's family tree from his biography by Charles Gray (1905)

In 1626 he married Joan Palmer, the daughter of William Palmer, an official in the Royal Parks. A portrait painter, she was one of the first women to practise painting professionally.

The couple had accommodation at Petersham Lodge. They moved to Covent Garden in 1654 but returned to Petersham two years later. They had two children, James (who was married to Ellen) and Penelope (married to John Fisher, a lawyer of the Middle Temple).

== Later years ==
Carlell continued in royal service into the Restoration period. On 6 June 1664, a warrant was issued to pay him £150, three years' back pay as Keeper of His Majesty's house and walk at Petersham in Richmond Park.

Lodowick died in 1675 and was buried on 21 August in Petersham churchyard. Joan died in 1679, and was buried beside her husband on 27 February.

== See also ==
- Match Me in London, a play written by Thomas Dekker and dedicated to Carlell
