= The Shepherd's Paradise =

Play

The Shepherd's Paradise was a Caroline-era masque written by Walter Montagu and designed by Inigo Jones. Acted in 1633 by Queen Henrietta Maria and her ladies in waiting, it was noteworthy as the first masque in which the Queen and her ladies filled speaking roles. Along with Tempe Restored (1632), The Shepherd's Paradise marked a step in the evolution in attitudes and practices that led to the acceptance of women onstage during the coming Restoration era.

== Performance ==
The masque was performed before King Charles I at Somerset House in London on 9 January 1633 (new style). Montagu's drama (it has been called a "fantasy", a "marathon" and an "extravanganza", among other things) is not a brief work; the original performance lasted seven or eight hours. It required four months of rehearsal by its aristocratic cast. Inigo Jones designed nine sets and eight changes of scene for the mammoth-scale production, which also saw an early use of the proscenium arch in English theatre. (Jones's stage designs for the piece, including some striking forest scenes, still exist.)

The work may have had a second performance of 2 February the same year; some of its costumes were later re-used for a revival of John Fletcher's The Faithful Shepherdess. Henrietta Maria then presented the sumptuous masque costumes to the King's Men, who had acted Fletcher's play.

== List of characters ==
Saphira/Bellesa

Basilino/Moramente

Agenor/Genorio/Palante, played by Cecilia Crofts

Fidamira/Gemella/Miranda

The King

Pantamora

Camena, played by Anne Kirke

Melidoro

Martiro

Bonorio

Osorio

Timante

Votorio

Romero

Princess Mirabella (not acted, only mentioned by other characters)

== Plot ==
The Shepherd's Paradise deals with a mythical pastoral community dedicated to Platonic love, a refuge for unrequited lovers of both genders – "a peaceful receptacle of distressed minds". The Shepherd's Paradise is ruled by Bellesa, "beauty", who was certainly played by Henrietta Maria. The heroine of the piece is Fidamira. Much of Montagu's plot, such as it is, centres upon a prince named Basilino and his bosom friend Agenor, who have a shared tendency to fall in love with the same women. (The work is complicated by the fact that characters take on pseudonyms when entering the Paradise: Basilino becomes Moramente, while Agenor calls himself Genorio.)

By the close of the play, Agenor/Genorio is revealed to be Prince Palante, long-lost son of the king of Navarre. The masque also features an extended debate on the nature of love, between Martiro, who speaks for the Platonic ideal, and Moramente and Melidoro, who argue for marriage. Since the play ends in the marriages typical of comedy – Basilino/Moramente marries Bellesa who is actually Sapphira, Princess of Navarre, his original betrothed, while Agenor/Genorio/Palante marries Basilino's sister – the text can be interpreted as suggesting a triumph of marital union over Platonic love. Fidamira is revealed as sister to both Bellesa/Sapphira and Agenor/Genorio/Palante, the lost princess Miranda; she remains chaste, but she gets to be queen of the Shepherd's Paradise at the end.

== Prynne ==
Montagu's masque was caught up in the controversy surrounding William Prynne and his Histriomastix. Prynne's attack on women actors as "notorious whores" was taken as a direct insult to the Queen. Prynne denied this, and his text may in fact have been published prior to the January 1633 performance of the masque. The masculine cross-dressing of some of the noblewomen in the masque also raised eyebrows. The King, at least, was pleased with his wife's work; the rehearsals and performance gave her some needed practice in English elocution.

== Publication ==
Unlike many of the court masques of the early Stuart era, Montagu's text was not published soon after its staging. It was entered into the Stationers' Register on 27 September 1658, and appeared in an octavo edition in 1659. The first edition is bibliographically confusing, with alternate title pages that credit the book either to the stationer Thomas Dring or to John Starkey; the prose Introduction is signed "T. D.", probably indicating Dring. Some copies are misdated "1629", a typographical error that misled early scholars.

The published text of Montagu's masque may have influenced Margaret Cavendish, Duchess of Newcastle in creating her play The Convent of Pleasure (1668).

== Manuscripts ==
The text also survives in several manuscripts, the most noteworthy being Sloane MS 3649 in the collection of the British Library. That manuscript features, as a Prologue, a dialogue between Apollo and Diana not included in the printed text; it also provides the identities of the courtly ladies who appeared in the masque.

== Critical responses ==
Critics have generally not been kind to Montagu's work, calling it "tedious", "worthless" and "unintelligible". (Even Montagu's contemporary Sir John Suckling, a fellow follower of the Queen, ridiculed it; in one of Suckling's poems, Apollo asks Montagu if he understands his own work.) Alfred Harbage, in his seminal study Cavalier Drama, considered Montagu's masque typical of most of what is wrong with Cavalier drama. (Critics of Harbage have noted that he blamed Montagu for the faults in plays that were written and performed prior to The Shepherd's Paradise.) Despite its faults, Montagu's work did inspire a brief re-invigoration of the pastoral form in later Caroline drama.

== Sources ==
- Chalmers, Hero. Royalist Women Writers, 1650–1689. Oxford, Clarendon Press, 2004.
- Greg, W. W. A Companion to Arber. Oxford, Clarendon Press, 1967.
- Harbage, Alfred. Cavalier Drama. New York, Modern Language Association of America, 1936.
- Leapman, Michael. Inigo: The Troubled Life of Inigo Jones, Architect of the English Renaissance. London, Headline Book Publishing, 2003.
- Milling, Jane, and Peter Thomson, eds. The Cambridge History of British Theatre, Vol. 1. Cambridge, Cambridge University Press, 2004.
- Sharpe, Kevin M. Criticism and Compliment: The Politics of Literature in the Court of Charles I. Cambridge, Cambridge University Press, 1987.
- Smuts, Robert Malcolm. Court Culture and the Origins of a Royalist Tradition in Early Stuart England. Philadelphia, University of Pennsylvania Press, 1999.
