= Closet drama =

Type of play

A closet drama is a play that is not intended to be performed onstage, but read by a solitary reader. The earliest use of the term recorded by the Oxford English Dictionary is in 1813. The literary historian Henry A. Beers in 1907 considered closet drama "a quite legitimate product of literary art."

== Definition ==
A closet drama (or closet play) is defined as a play created primarily for reading, rather than production. Closet dramas can be defined in narrower terms as belonging to a genre of dramatic writing unconcerned with stage technique. However, stageability is only one aspect of such works: historically, playwrights might choose the genre of 'closet' dramatic writing to avoid censorship of works which had political implications. Closet drama has also been used as a mode of dramatic writing for those without access to the commercial playhouse, and in this context has become closely associated with early modern women's writing. Closet dramas were sometimes published (or circulated in manuscript form), to include dramatis personae and elaborate stage directions, allowing readers to imagine the text as if it were being performed. This created an "unusually tight fusion between book and reader as it endeavours to stimulate the theatrical imagination." The playwrights did not have to worry about the pressure to impress an audience due to their audience being whom they chose. Thus, it was considered to be a freeing style of writing.

The academic Marta Straznicky in 2004 described the form as "part of a larger cultural matrix in which closed spaces, selective interpretive communities, and political dissent are aligned." Print is the crucial factor behind closet dramas: "a play that is not intended for commercial performance can nevertheless cross between private playreading and the public sphere" through this medium.

== History ==
The philosophical dialogues of ancient Greek and Roman writers such as Plato were written in the form of conversations between "characters" and are in this respect similar to closet drama, many of which feature little action but are often rich in philosophical rhetoric.

Beginning with Friedrich von Schlegel, many have argued that the tragedies of Seneca the Younger in the first century AD were written to be recited at small parties rather than performed. Although that theory has become widely pervasive in the history of theater, there is no evidence to support the contention that Seneca's plays were intended to be read or recited at small gatherings of the wealthy. The emperor Nero, a pupil of Seneca, may have performed in some of them. Some of the drama of the Middle Ages was of the closet-drama type, such as the drama of Hroswitha of Gandersheim and debate poems in quasi-dramatic form.

=== Elizabethan and Stuart ===
Fulke Greville, Samuel Daniel, Elizabeth Cary, Sir William Alexander, and Mary Sidney wrote what now might be considered as closet dramas (although they were not aware of the term, and there is no evidence that they considered their works part of such a genre) in the age of Shakespeare and Jonson.

Between 1642 and 1660, the English government banned public performance. During this time, playreading became a "substitute" for playgoing. Thus, playwrights were moved to take on "propagandist aims" against parliament and topics beyond the theatre in their writing, meaning reading such work could be considered a revolutionary act. However, playwrights could write in relative security, protected by the anonymous means of print. Thomas Killigrew is an example of a stage playwright who turned to this form of writing when his plays could no longer be produced during this period; he was in exile from England during the English Civil War.

Following the Restoration in 1660, some authors continued to write in this form, proving in the view of some modern academics that the form "served a cultural function distinct from that of commercial drama." John Milton's play Samson Agonistes, written in 1671, is an example of early modern drama never intended for the stage.

=== Nineteenth century ===
Several closet dramas in verse were written in Europe after 1800; these plays were by and large inspired by classical models. Faust, Part 1 and Faust, Part 2 by Johann Wolfgang von Goethe, among the most acclaimed pieces in the history of German literature, were written as closet dramas, though both plays have been frequently staged. Lord Byron, Percy Bysshe Shelley, and Alexander Pushkin devoted much time to the closet drama.

The popularity of closet drama at this time was both a sign of, and a reaction to, the decline of the verse tragedy on the European stage in the 1800s. Popular tastes in theater were shifting toward melodrama and comedy and there was little commercial appeal in staging verse tragedies (though Coleridge, Robert Browning, and others wrote verse dramas that were staged in commercial theaters). Playwrights who wanted to write verse tragedy had to resign themselves to writing for readers, rather than actors and audiences. Nineteenth-century closet drama became a longer poetic form, without the connection to practical theater and performance.

== Early women writers in the closet drama form ==
In the view of some modern academics, in the early modern period, women writers who were unable to "use their voice" in public were able to emphasize their opinions using the form of closet drama, which provided them the ability to "engage in political discourse without exposing [their] views to an indiscriminate public," since they could choose to restrict their readership.

Margaret, Duchess of Newcastle-on-Tyne (1623-1673), author of fourteen folio volumes, explored writing in the closet drama form during her exile and became one of the best known women playwrights due to her interest in philosophical nature.

Other notable women involved in this form of writing include Anne Finch, Jane Lumley, and Elizabeth Cary.

== See also ==
- Radio drama
- Readers theater
- Verse drama and dramatic verse
