= Alfred Harbage =

American Shakespeare scholar and crime fiction writer

Alfred Bennett Harbage (July 18, 1901 – May 1976) was an American Shakespeare scholar and crime fiction writer.

== Early life and education ==
Alfred Bennett Harbage was born in Philadelphia and received his undergraduate degree and doctorate from the University of Pennsylvania. He lectured on Shakespeare both there and at Columbia University.

== Career ==
Harbage was a professor at Harvard University, where he taught for many years. He was the General Editor of the Pelican Books edition of the works of Shakespeare. He also wrote a number of well-received books on Shakespeare's works, among them Shakespeare's Audience (1941), As They Liked It (1947), Shakespeare and the Rival Traditions (1952), and Shakespeare Without Words (1966).

Though best known for his work on Shakespeare, Harbage's literary scholarship extended to his successors too; he did important work on a range of seventeenth-century figures. In this area, his books Thomas Killigrew, Cavalier Dramatist 1612-1683 (1930), Sir William Davenant, Poet Adventurer 1606-1668 (1935), and Cavalier Drama (1936) are noteworthy. For an overview of the field, his Annals of English Drama 975-1700 (1964) is a compedium of original materials and a vital resource for scholarship.

He also wrote crime fiction under the pen name Thomas Kyd (a reference to the 16th-century English playwright Thomas Kyd), publishing several stories in Ellery Queen's Mystery Magazine, as well as four novels: Blood is a Beggar (1946), Blood of Vintage (1947), Blood on the Bosom Devine (1948), and Cover His Face (1949). The first three are hard-boiled murder mysteries, involving ex-boxer turned police officer Sam Phelan; the last is an academic mystery dealing with a researcher seeking the first published work of Samuel Johnson.

One reviewer said of his work that "Harbage treats pomposity with sarcasm, hypocrisy with irony, and failure with gentleness."

Harbage was elected to the American Philosophical Society in 1959 and the American Academy of Arts and Sciences in 1960.
