= Henry Herringman =

English bookseller and publisher (1628–1704)

Henry Herringman (1628–1704) was a prominent London bookseller and publisher in the second half of the 17th century. He is especially noted for his publications in English Renaissance drama and English Restoration drama; he was the first publisher of the works of John Dryden. He conducted his business under the sign of the Blue Anchor in the lower walk of the New Exchange.

Herringman had established himself as an independent bookseller and publisher by 1655. He issued the first edition of Thomas Middleton's Hengist, King of Kent in 1661. In the 1662 edition of William Howel's General history it states that Howel's history was "printed for Henry Herringman...to be sold in his shop, at the Anchor in the lower Walk in the New Exchange, 1662". Herringman had a reputation as a rare stationer who actually profited from the Great Fire of London (1666), in which most of his compatriots lost their stocks of printed books. He was a member of the syndicates of stationers who issued the major collections of William Shakespeare and his contemporaries in the second half of the century, including the Shakespeare Fourth Folio (1685), the third Ben Jonson folio (1692), and the second Beaumont and Fletcher folio (1679). Herringman also published the collected plays of Thomas Killigrew (1664); the collected works of Sir William Davenant (1673); the Dryden/Davenant adaptation of The Tempest (1670); and plays by Thomas Shadwell, William Wycherley, George Etherege, and Sir Robert Howard, among others.

Dryden appears to have had a close professional relationship with Herringman early in his career, when he served as a sort of general editorial assistant in Herringman's business, perhaps to the point of taking his board and lodging with Herringman. In this capacity as a supervisor and reviser of texts, Dryden may have worked on Shakespearean plays for Herringman.

In addition to dramas, Herringman published a large body of nondramatic literature, including (partnered with John Martyn) the 1678 edition of Samuel Butler's Hudibras, which contained the poem's third and final part. Herringman published works by Abraham Cowley, Katherine Philips, John Donne, Francis Bacon, Roger Boyle, and Robert Boyle. He also produced a wide variety of general-interest works, as well as law books.

Herringman became master of the Stationers Company in 1685. After selling his retail business in 1684, Herringman became, in effect, the first wholesale book publisher in England; his imprint exists on 532 publications from his era.
