= Killigrew =

Killigrew is a surname of Cornish origin. Notable people with this surname include:

- Alan Killigrew (1919–2001), Australian Rules footballer and coach
- Anne Killigrew (1660–1685), English poet and painter, lady-in waiting to the Duchess of York
- Anne Killigrew (1607–1641), English Lady-in-Waiting to Queen Henrietta Maria; wife of George Kirke
- Catherine Killigrew (1618–1689)
- Lady Catherine Killigrew (c.1530–1583), English scholar
- Elizabeth Killigrew, Viscountess Shannon (1622–1680), wife of Francis Boyle and mistress to Charles II of England
- Henry Killigrew (disambiguation), several people
- Sir Robert Killigrew (1580–1633), English courtier and MP
- Thomas Killigrew (1612–1683), dramatist and theatre manager
- William Killigrew (disambiguation), several people

== See also ==
- John F. Killgrew (1894–1968), New York assemblyman
