= Anne Killigrew =

British poet, artist (1660–1685)

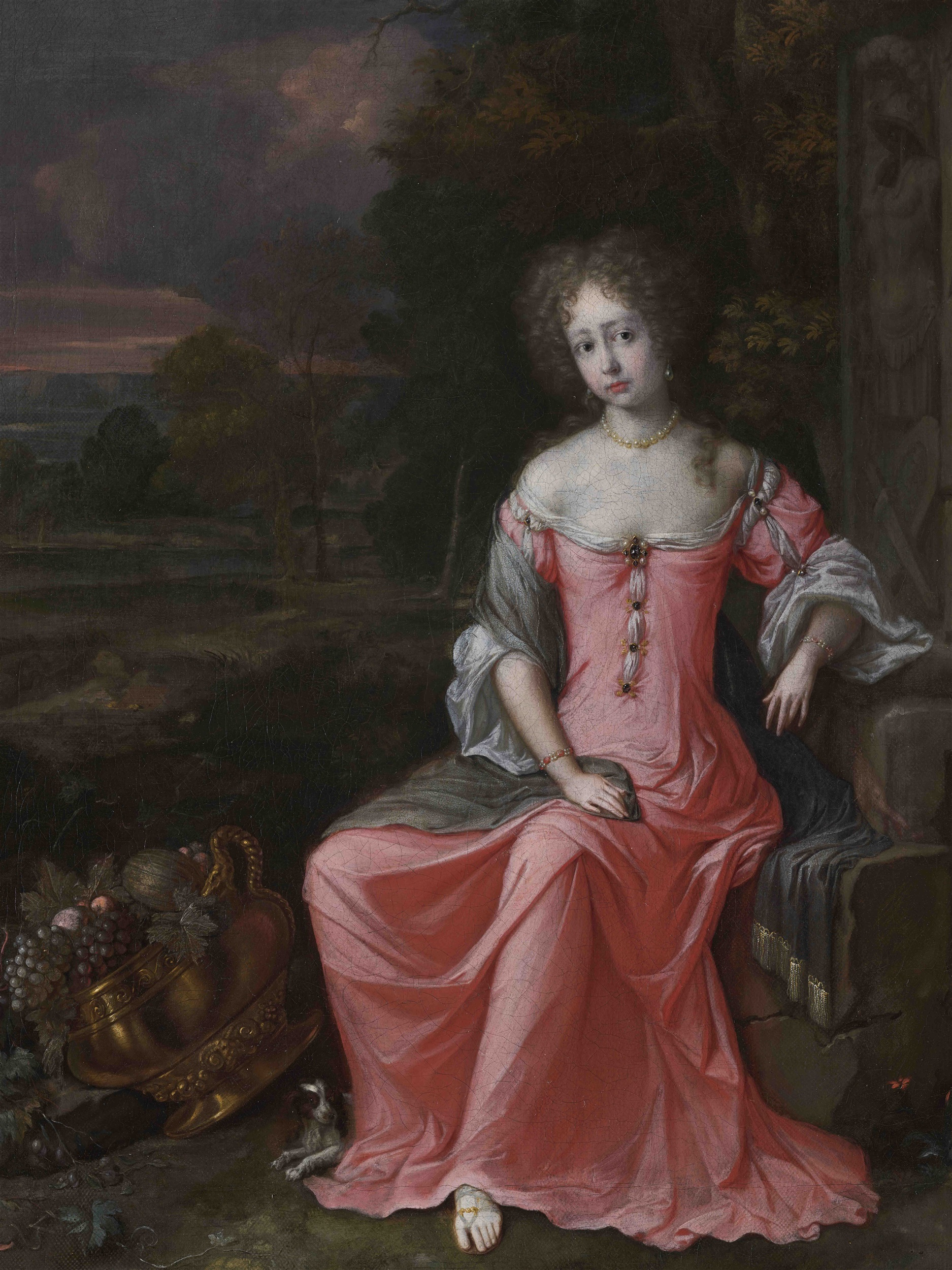
- Anne Killigrew, self portrait
- Born: 1660; St Martin's Lane, London, England
- Died: 16 June 1685 (aged 24–25); London, England
- Occupation: Poet

Anne Killigrew (1660–1685) was an English poet and painter, described by contemporaries as "A Grace for beauty, and a Muse for wit." Born in London, she and her family were active in literary and court circles. Killigrew's poems were circulated in manuscript and collected and published posthumously in 1686 after she died from smallpox at age 25. They have been reprinted several times by modern scholars, most recently and thoroughly by Margaret J. M. Ezell.

Killigrew was eulogized by John Dryden in his poem To The Pious Memory of the Accomplish'd Young Lady Mrs. Anne Killigrew (1686). Dryden praised her accomplishments in both Poësie, and Painting, and compared her poetic abilities to the famous Greek woman poet of antiquity, Sappho. Dryden's poem has received extensive critical analysis and a wide range of interpretations.

Several paintings attributed to Killigrew are known. These include a self-portrait in Berkeley Castle, and a portrait of James II of England in the Royal Collection (in 2019 on display in Hillsborough Castle). Both of these are about half life-size but full-length.

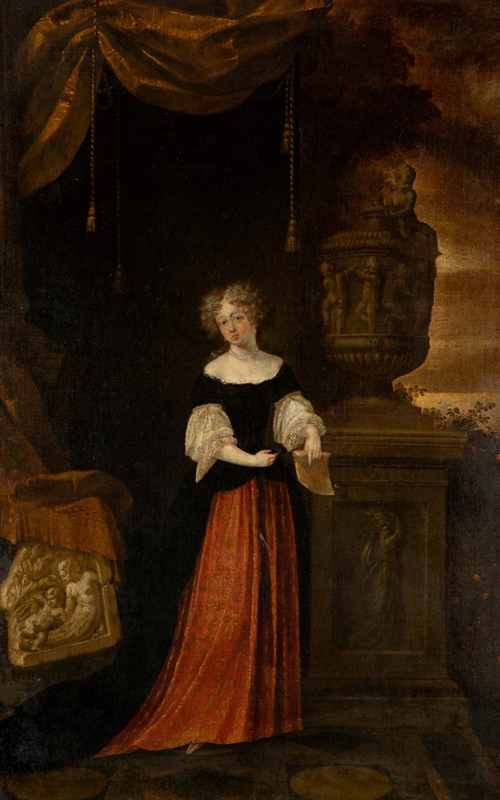
Anne Killigrew, self-portrait, Berkeley Castle

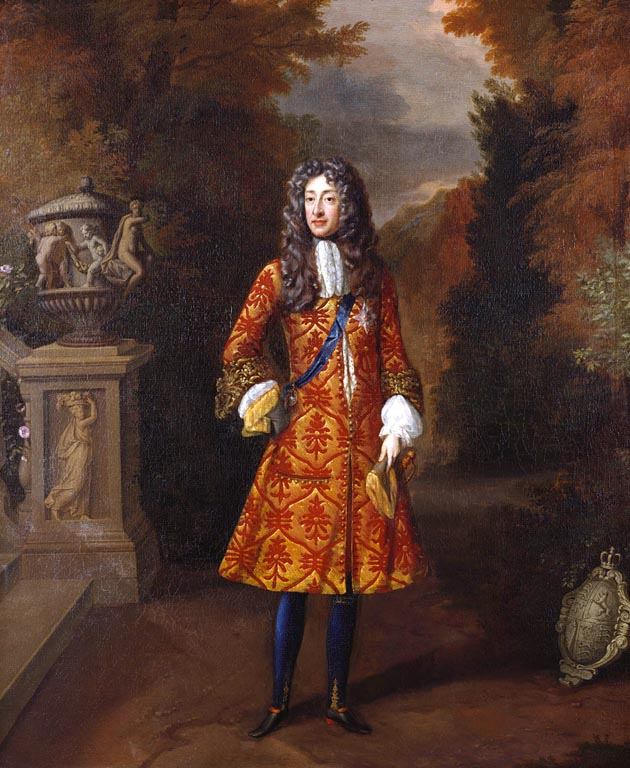
Portrait of James II (1685) by Anne Killigrew

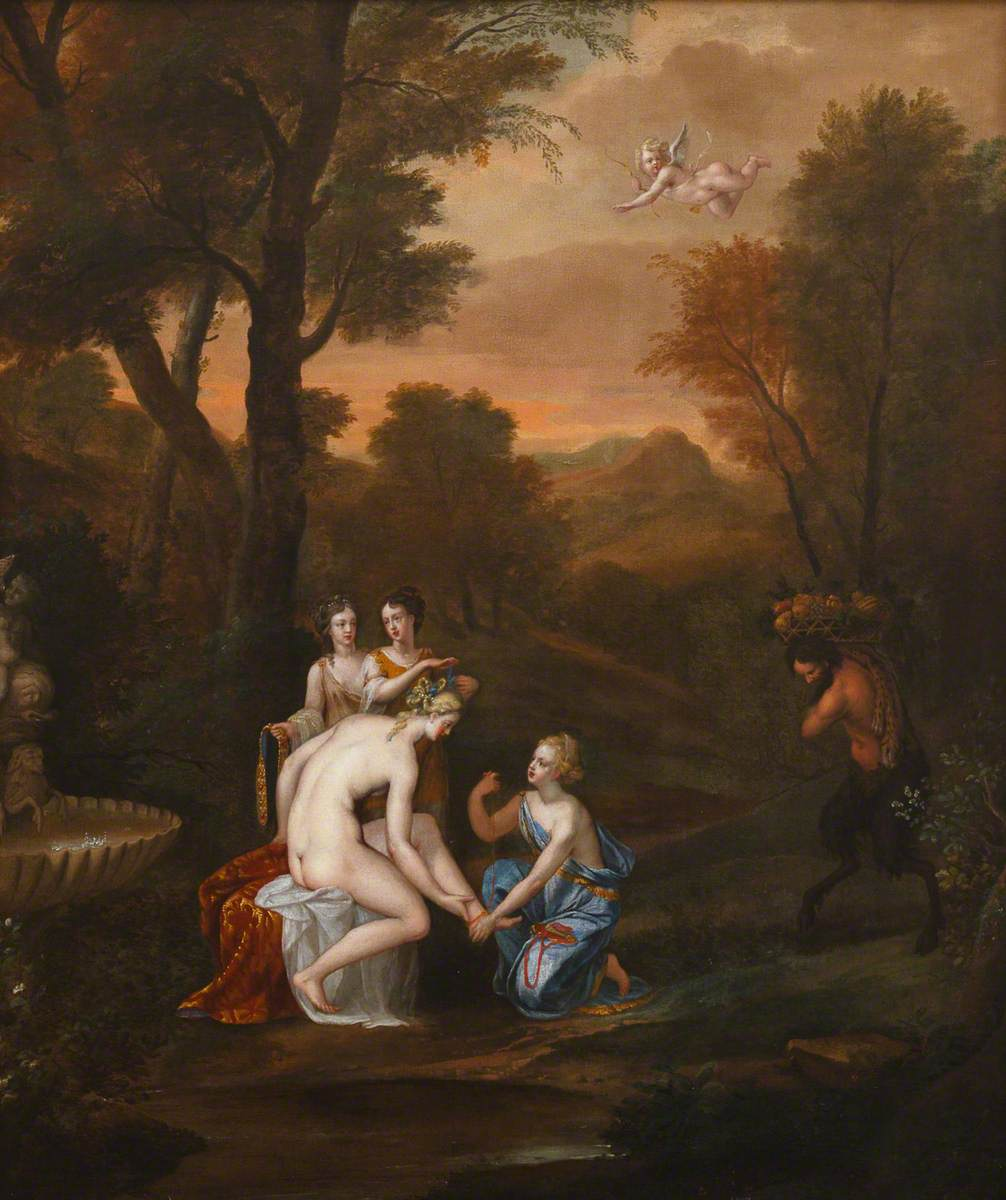
Venus Attired by the Three Graces by Anne Killigrew

== Early life and inspiration ==
Anne Killigrew was born in early 1660, before the Restoration, at St Martin's Lane in London. Her mother Judith Killigrew was a talented musician who played the lute and read Shakespeare. Her father Dr. Henry Killigrew published several sermons and poems as well as a play called The Conspiracy. Her two paternal uncles were also published playwrights. Sir William Killigrew (1606–1695) published two collections of plays. Thomas Killigrew (1612–1683) not only wrote plays but held a royal patent for the King's Company, and built the theatre now known as Drury Lane.

Her family, including her uncles William and Thomas, had close connections with the Stuart Court, serving Charles I, Charles II, and his Queen, Catherine of Braganza. Her grandfather, Robert Killigrew, was knighted by King James I in 1603, and appointed Vice-Chamberlain to Queen Henrietta Maria in 1630. Her father Henry Killigrew was a chaplain to Charles I, and chaplain and almoner to James, Duke of York (the future James II). Following the Restoration, Henry Killigrew became Master of the Savoy.

One of her aunts, also named Anne Killigrew (1607-1641), was appointed Lady-in-waiting to Queen Henrietta Maria beginning in 1631 and Dresser to the Queen beginning in April 1637. Another aunt, Elizabeth Boyle, served as a Lady-in-waiting to Queen Henrietta Maria, and bore an illegitimate daughter to Charles I as of 1651, while he was still in exile. Anne Killigrew's mother, Judith Killigrew, was a lady-in-waiting to Charles II's queen Catherine of Braganza. The younger Anne Killigrew is listed as one of six Maids of Honour to Mary of Modena, Duchess of York, as of 1683.

Anne had two older sisters, Mary and Elizabeth, both of whom married outside of court circles. Their father, Henry Killigrew, held the living at Wheathampstead, Hertfordshire beginning in 1663. On 14 August 1665 Mary married Nicholas Only, a clerk at Wheathampstead. On 8 May 1673 Elizabeth married the Reverend John Lambe, who took up the position of rector at Wheathampstead, Henry Killigrew having resigned from the post. Anne also had two brothers: Henry Killigrew (1652-1712) and James Killigrew (1664-1695). Both joined the Royal Navy and held positions of responsibility. Henry rose to the rank of admiral and became a member of the Board of Admiralty.

Little is recorded about Anne's education, but she received instruction in both poetry and painting and was encouraged to pursue her creative talents, options unusual for women in the 17th century. Themes and details of her poetry and painting indicate that she was well versed in the Bible, Roman and Greek mythology, and philosophy.

Inspiration for Killigrew's poetry came as well as from other female poets who lived during the Restoration period: Katherine Philips and Anne Finch (also a maid to Mary of Modena at the same time as Killigrew). Mary of Modena encouraged the French tradition of precieuses (patrician women intellectuals) and supported women's participation in theater, literature, and music. Residing at court, Killigrew was part of a milieu of poetic feminist inspiration on a daily basis; she was a companion of strong intelligent women who encouraged her writing career as much as their own.

It was not unusual for poets, especially for women, not to see their work published in their lifetime. Before her death Anne Killigrew's poems were circulated in manuscript through selected networks of "social authorship", in which participants were often identified by pennames. Some of Killigrew's poems, like "To my Lord Colrane", were complimentary verses written according to "conventions of compliment and courtly exchange". Since Killigrew died at the young age of 25 she was only able to produce a small corpus of poetry. Compared to Philips, Finch, and others, Killigrew was an early and developing writer. Her contemporaries had many more years to develop their voices and to refine and polish their works.

Soon after Killigrew's death, a short book of thirty-three poems was published by her father as a memorial. It was suggested in the text that the last three poems might simply have been found among her papers, and not written by her. Others have argued that they are stylistically consistent with her works. Before 2009, none of her poems were known to exist in manuscript form; then a small number were found among the papers of the John Evelyn family at the British Library.

== The Poet and the Painter ==
Anne Killigrew excelled in multiple media, which was noted by contemporary poet, mentor, and family friend, John Dryden in his dedicatory ode to her. He addresses her as "the Accomplisht Young LADY Mrs Anne Killigrew, Excellent in the two Sister-Arts of Poësie, and Painting." Indeed, Dryden uses Killigrew's accomplishments in the two sister arts as a major organizing feature of his Ode.

Scholars believe that Killigrew painted a total of 15 paintings. Both her poems and her paintings emphasize women and nature, and many of her paintings display biblical and mythological imagery. Several of her poems reference her own paintings, including "St. John Baptist Painted by her self in the Wilderness, with Angels appearing to him, and with a Lamb by him", "HERODIAS Daughter presenting to her Mother St. JOHN's Head in a Charger, also Painted by her self", and "On a Picture Painted by her self, representing two Nimphs of DIANA's, one in a posture to Hunt, the other Batheing." A list of paintings, published for Admiral Killigrew's Sale in 1727, included "Venus and Adonis"; "Satyr Playing the Pipe"; "Judith and Holiferness"; "A Woman's Head"; and "Venus attired by the Graces".

Killigrew was skilled at portraits. James Winn has suggested that the faces of the Graces in "Venus attired by the Graces" resemble those in portraits known to be of Anne Finch, Mary of Modena and Anne Killigrew. Today, as few as four of her paintings are known to exist. They include a self-portrait and a portrait of James, Duke of York.

== Critical reception ==
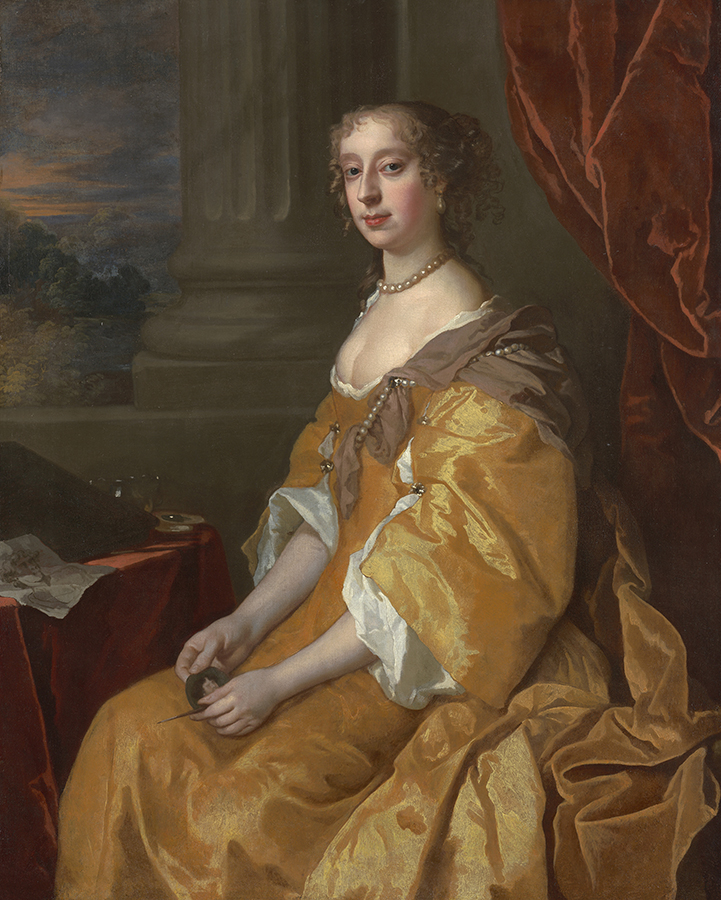
Portrait believed to be Anne Killigrew, by Sir Peter Lely

=== Contemporaries ===
John Dryden's famous, extolling ode praises Killigrew for her beauty, virtue, and literary and artistic talent. Dryden was one of several contemporaries who wrote in praise of Killigrew after her death, and the posthumous collection of her work published in 1686 included additional poems commending her literary merit, irreproachable piety, and personal charm. Killigrew's virtue and poetic talent are also emphasized in poems by her contemporaries John Chatwin and Edmund Wodehouse.

Samuel Johnson considered Dryden's ode "the noblest our language has produced." Horace Walpole was less enthusiastic, describing Dryden's ode as "an harmonious hyperbole". Anthony Wood in his 1721 essay defends Dryden's praise of Killigrew, confirming that Killigrew "was equal to, if not superior" to any of the compliments lavished upon her. Furthermore, Wood asserts that Killigrew's poems must have been well received in her time, otherwise "her Father would never have suffered them to pass the Press" after her death.

=== Modern critiques of Dryden's Ode ===
The best known assessment of Killigrew's work, Dryden's ode, has received far more extensive literary analysis than Killigrew's own work. Critics have tended to assert that Dryden's praise is excessive. They have argued variously that Dryden's ode should be read as a formal exercise illustrative of Augustan sensibility, as irony, as a validation of poetry rather than of a person, or as political allegory.

Robert Daly suggests that Dryden's ode should be read in the context of Dryden's beliefs about poetry as a moral force, and with an awareness of Dryden's involvement within a contemporary community of poets. Dryden viewed poets as teachers of moral truths, and repeatedly sought to celebrate and encourage other writers. Killigrew was significant to Dryden as a moral exemplar as well as a writer of poems, and is praised by him on both grounds and presented as a model for others. For Dryden, these are not separate issues but deeply connected: religion, morals, poetry and politics are fundamentally interrelated. Anne Killigrew may be a younger poet of lesser skill than Dryden, but she shares Dryden's "operative ethic". Seen in this light, as an "ethically sensitive poet", who was "a member of the community whose goals he sought to serve, she merited and received his best effort". In praising Killigrew and encouraging others to read her work, Dryden "serve[s] the long cause of poetry."

In terms of structure, Dryden's ode follows the forms of an elegy as well as being an ode. Daly argues that Dryden's ode also should be read structurally as an implicit dialogue with parallels to a canonization trial. In such a structure the author is able to raise and then respond to possible objections to his apotheosis of Anne Killigrew. Within this reading, the opposition of ideas that others have interpreted as ironic becomes an understandable progression within an argument. Ann Messenger considers Daly's case to be "well argued".

=== Critiques of Killigrew's poetry ===
Killigrew's work includes religious and pastoral poems, as well as tributes to those in family and court circles, and intensely personal poems. It is not known who organized them for publication, but the order may be somewhat chronological. The poems are also grouped by poetic genre, which displays their variety and Killigrew's versatility as a poet. The first of Killigrew's poems is an unfinished epic, in which Alexander is challenged by Amazons! Epigrams are grouped together, as are pastorals, philosophical poems, poems that reference her own paintings, and other personal poems. Occasional poems appear throughout. "The arrangement of her verse, then, reinforces the impression that she viewed herself ... as a serious beginning poet, exploring all the facets of her craft."

Those who criticize Killigrew for focusing on conventional topics, such as death, love, and the human condition, ignore the social conventions of her time. "Women could not speak in the voices of bard, theologian, scholar, or courtly lover" but were largely limited to "tones of private life". Like Katherine Philips and Anne Finch, Killigrew generally writes as if for a private audience, on private themes. This strategy was often adopted even when the underlying subject had implications for the public and for politics.

The very poetic structures that women chose reflected this and helped them to avoid charges of inappropriate self-display. As Margaret Anne Doody has observed, iambic tetrameter was often used by Augustan women poets. Such a meter was not associated with male classical learning or intellectual dominance; rather it supported casualness, individuality, and originality. John Dryden's statement, in his "Ode To the Pious Memory of the accomplished young lady, Mrs. Anne Killigrew," that "Art she had none, yet wanted none, / For Nature did that want supply", may reflect such a distinction between "artificial" and "natural" poetic forms. Such qualities continue to connect Killigrew and other women poets of her time with modern readers. In many of her poems, she achieves a timeless quality.

Similarly, the pastoral form was seen as less intellectual and thus "safe" for the use of women poets. It is important to recognize, then, that Killigrew overturns a number of the form's well-established conventions in her pastoral poems. Unlike male pastoral poets who tended to voice male characters, Killigrew divides her dialogue between males and females, giving women the chance to initiate and control the discourse. "Her female voices, often rhetorically powerful, become the dominant orators in her pastoral dialogues." Both the gender and the authority of the speaker are breaks with convention. Traditionally submissive, the female speakers in Killigrew's pastorals achieve a position of power and self-control vis-a-vis traditionally dominant male speakers.

Finally Killigrew introduces darker themes into the pastoral form, using it to warn women of the dangerous potential of transient love affairs. All too often pastoral love is a matter of beauty or availability. The speaker lists the suffering nymphs who have given away their hearts only to be tossed aside. Killigrew's changes to the pastoral tradition suggest a commentary on both the moral tradition of the pastoral and the mores of the Stuart court, which has been described as both hedonistic and "notoriously libertine". In her pastoral poems, Killigrew suggests what it meant to her to be virtuous in a world of license. She creates poems in which chastity, emotional self-control, and constancy are all valued. "Anne Killigrew's poetry finds its value as an act of reflection and exploration of courtly life and morality."

Dryden emphasized Killigrew's importance as a voice for virtue and order in a world where license and sin were prevalent. Velez-Nunez sees Killigrew's choice of virtue as a rebellion against the licentiousness of the court in which she lived. In "To the Queen", Killigrew turns the heroic mode of her opening poem, "Alexandreis", on its head and uses it to critique the Stuart court. Alexander's "Frantic Might" is contrasted with the queen's "Grace and Goodness." Through her poems, Killigrew foregrounds and praises women for strength and heroic power ("Alexandreis", "To the Queen", "Herodias") as well as for virtue. She encourages her readers to lead a virtuous life while she acknowledges the ongoing experience of temptation and "gilded nothings" which mislead the soul ("A Farewell to Worldly Joys"). Regarding virtue, Anne Killigrew may be more accurately characterized as a self-deprecating and witty observer rather than as a didactic moralist.

"Upon the Saying That My Verses Were Made by Another" has been described as "a cornerstone for women's literary history" due to its frequent reprinting in anthologies and its discussion in women's studies. In it, Killigrew describes her experiences as a woman and a writer. Her tone is "forthright and direct". "The poem narrates her personal history as a poet, her desire to write, her ambition to be recognized, and, finally, her feelings of being badly treated by an audience who refused to believe her the author of her own work." Through a shifting series of metaphors reminiscent of a love affair, Killigrew describes her changing relationship with the god of poetry and with her audience. After deciding to vow herself to the muse of poetry, "pleasing Raptures fill'd my Ravisht Sense"; but when she reveals herself, "What ought t'have brought me Honour, brought me shame!" In a twisting of Aesop's Painted Jay, her readers tear off her feathers to give them away to others. Kristina Straub suggests that the metaphors of violation, domination, and submission within the poem are similar to those of rape. Nonetheless, Killigrew converts "the experience of victimization into the energy of anger". She finds a new locus of power by choosng to rebel against what is said against her and to continue writing despite the difficulties this involves.

Th'Envious Age, only to Me alone,

Will not allow, what I do write, my Own,
But let 'em Rage, and 'gainst a Maide Conspire,
So Deathless Numbers from my Tuneful Lyre
Do ever flow; so Phebus I by thee
Divinely Inspired and possest may be;
I willingly accept Cassandras Fate,

To speak the Truth, although believ'd too late.

== Authorship question ==
In the 1686 edition of Killigrew's Poems, the last three poems are proceeded by a note: "These Three following ODES being found among Mrs Killigrews Papers, I was willing to Print though none of hers." The poems in question are:

- Cloris Charmes, Dissolved by EUDORA.
- Upon a Little Lady Under the Discipline of an Excellent Person.
- On the Soft and Gentle Motions of Eudora.

Some have argued that these three poems are stylistically consistent with Killigrew's other works. However, as Carol Barash states, "there is no archival evidence to establish who actually wrote them."

== An early death ==
Killigrew died of smallpox in 1685, when she was only 25 years old. She was buried in the chancel of the Savoy Chapel (dedicated to St John the Baptist) on 15 June 1685. A monument was built in her honour but later destroyed by a fire. Her mother, Judith Killigrew, was also buried there, as of 2 February 1683.

== Writing ==
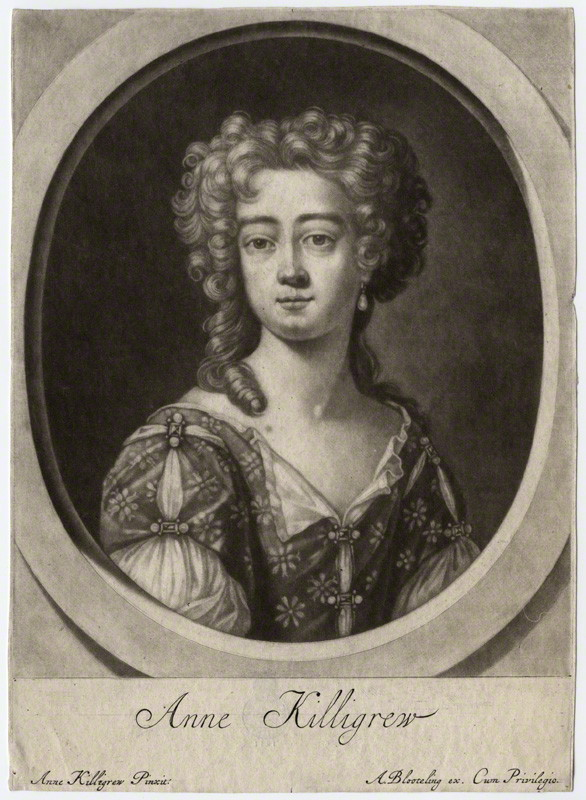
Mezzotint of Anne Killigrew, based on a self portrait she had painted.

=== Editions ===
- Killigrew, Anne (1686). Poems. London: Printed for Samuel Lowndes.
- Killigrew, Anne (1967). Morton, Richard (ed.). Poems (1686). A facsimile reproduction with an introduction. Gainesville, Fla.: Scholars' Facsimiles & Reprints.
- Killigrew, Anne (2003). Hoffmann, Patricia (ed.). Anne Killigrew / selected and introduced. Aldershot, England; Burlington, VT: Ashgate.
- Killigrew, Anne (2013). Ezell, Margaret J.M. (ed.). "My rare wit killing sin": poems of a Restoration courtier (PDF). Toronto: Centre for Reformation and Renaissance Studies. Archived from the original (PDF) on 22 September 2021.

=== Poems ===
1. Alexandreis
2. To the Queen
3. A Pastoral Dialogue
4. On Death
5. Upon Being Contented with a Little
6. On Billinda
7. On an Atheist
8. On Galla
9. A Farewell to Worldly Joys
10. The Complaint of a Lover
11. Love, the Soul of Poetry
12. To my Lady Berkeley
13. St. John the Baptist
14. Herodias
15. Nimphs of Diana's
16. An Invective against Gold
17. The Miseries of Man
18. Verses
19. Queen Katherine
20. My Lord Colrane
21. The Discontent
22. A Pastoral Dialogue
23. A Pastoral Dialogue
24. On my Aunt Mrs. A. K.
25. On a Young Lady
26. On the Duchess of Grafton
27. Penelope to Ulysses
28. An Epitaph on Herself
29. An Ode
30. Young Gallant
31. Cloris Charmes
32. Upon a Little Lady
33. Motions of Eudora
