= Mary Woodhouse =

Musician and correspondent of Constantijn Huygens

Mary Woodhouse, Lady Killigrew (d. 1656), musician and correspondent of Constantijn Huygens, was the daughter of Henry Woodhouse (MP) of Hickling and Waxham, and Anne Bacon, daughter of Sir Nicholas Bacon. (Without support, some sources instead say she was a daughter of the Woodhouse family of Kimberley, Norfolk.) She may have been the "Woodhouse" appointed Maid of Honour to Anne of Denmark in December 1603.

== Lady Killigrew ==
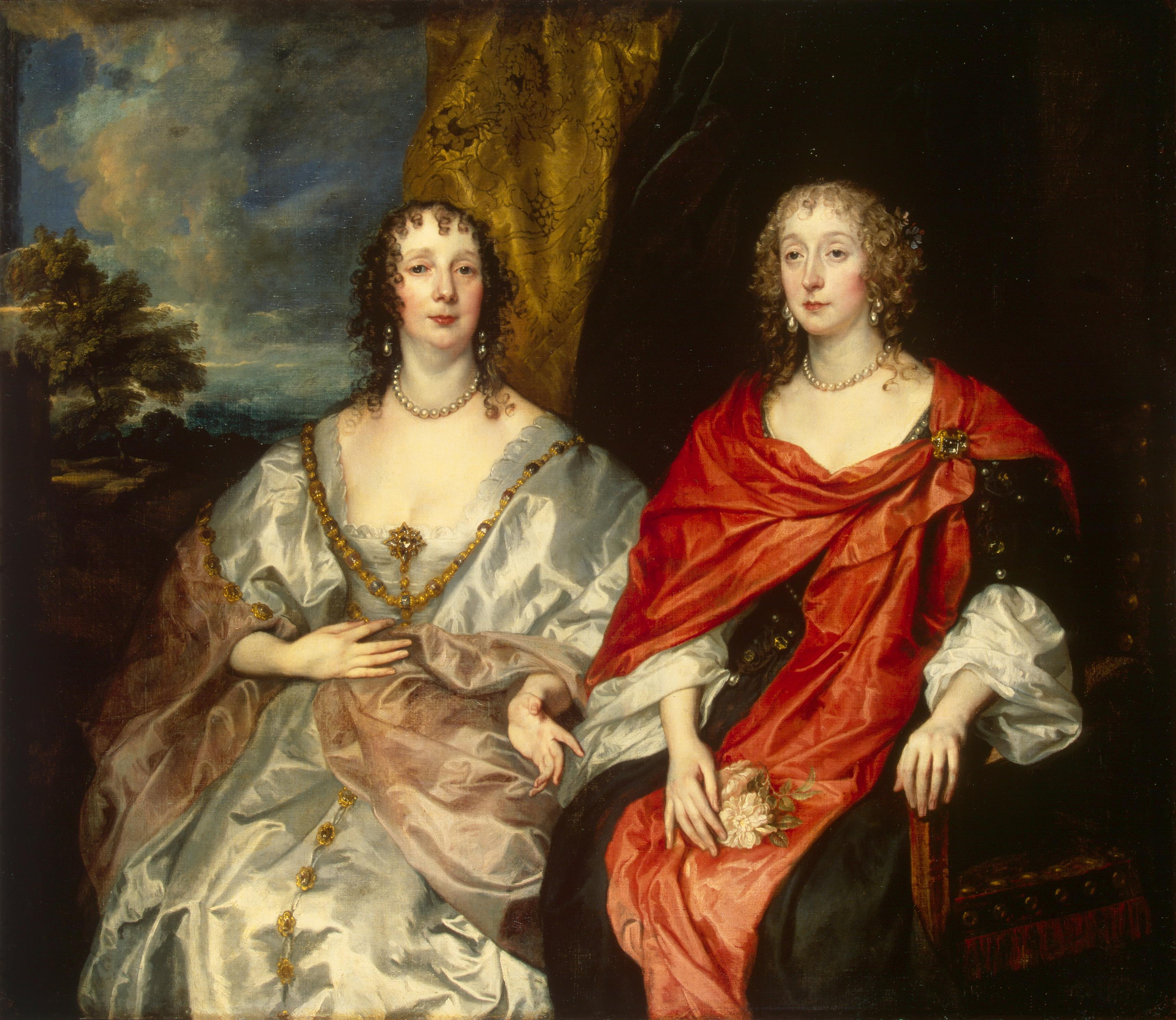
Anne Kirke and the Countess of Derby or Countess of Morton, c. 1638

She married Sir Robert Killigrew of Lothbury and Hanworth, a courtier and politician, in 1604. Her sister Anne married her third husband Sir Julius Caesar, Master of the Rolls, in April 1615. Lucy Russell, Countess of Bedford sent Lady Killigrew an invitation, seeing an opportunity to be a peace-maker for Sir Thomas Overbury, writing, "I doubt not but so well to play the umpire, as shall end Sir Thomas Overberie's quarrels, which I very much desire for both your sakes, and to witness the charity of your affectionate friend Bedford."

In May 1613, Robert Killigrew was caught talking to Overbury, a prisoner in the Tower of London, and sent to the Fleet Prison for a short time. He was later accused of involvement in Overbury's murder, because he had supplied white powder to his patron, the Earl of Somerset, but exonerated. At the funeral of Anne of Denmark in 1619, Lady Killigrew walked in procession with the ladies of the queen's privy chamber.

The Killigrews's circle of friends included; the poet John Donne, the philosopher Francis Bacon, the courtier Sir John Finet, the musician Nicholas Lanier, Jacques Gaultier the royal lutenist and favourite of the Marquess of Buckingham, and the artist and inventor Cornelius Drebbel.

She met Constantijn Huygens at her house in Lothbury in London in 1622 and they kept up a correspondence. Huygens was attracted to her, and later wrote a Latin poem mentioning her "snow-white throat" and "divine voice". This did not please Huygen's friend Dorothea van Dorp.

Killigrew had a house near Hampton Court, called Kineton or Kempton Park and in May 1623 the king saw the garden or "designment of a fine ground", a pretty lodge, a gracious lady (Mary Killigrew), a fair maid (probably Anne Killigrew), and the pools, deer, and heronry.

== Lady Stafford ==
Robert Killigrew died in 1633, and she later married Sir Thomas Stafford, a gentleman usher to Henrietta Maria, and was known as "Lady Stafford".

A letter of February 1636 mentions a Sir Thomas Stafford at court, perhaps the usher, who was "piteously in love, and some times he's in hope and some times in despair, and what will be his end I know not".

Lady Stafford was Constantijn Huygens's connection to the court architect Inigo Jones. When Jacob van Campen designed a new house for Huygens in The Hague, completed in 1639, he had a set of engravings made and sent a copy to Rubens. He sent another set to Lady Stafford so she could present them to Inigo Jones, with an invitation for her to see the new house and visit the court of Elizabeth Stuart, Queen of Bohemia. Huygens entrusted the package with the engravings to the English ambassador Sir William Boswell, and also involved Sir John Finet, master of ceremonies at court, to ensure Inigo Jones received the plans, which would show, "Vitruvius is not altogether exiled from Holland".

Lady Stafford was an acknowledged expert in the quality of musical instruments. Elizabeth Dudley, Countess of Löwenstein, a lady in waiting to Elizabeth Stuart, Queen of Bohemia, met Lady Stafford in London in 1639 and wrote to Huygens, saying that Lady Stafford often spoke of him and intended to send him a musical instrument called a theorbo. In 1649, unwell or uneasy about the questions, Lady Stafford would not recommend a lute that Jacques Gaultier was trying to sell to Huygens. This was a rare vintage instrument, made by Laux Maler. The family of the royal lutenist John Ballard had sold it to Charles I of England who had given it to Gaultier. Lisa Jardine suggests the sale of this lute once belonging to the deposed king may have been distasteful to Lady Stafford.

Mary Boyle, Countess of Warwick wrote, "she was a cunning old woman who had been herself too much, and was too long versed in amours." Mary Boyle had lived at a house of Lady Stafford's, and her brother Francis Boyle, Lord Shannon, married Elizabeth Killigrew at Whitehall Palace in 1639. Francis was sent to away to France after the marriage and Elizabeth and Mary Boyle were companions for a time, until Lady Stafford sent Mary Boyle to stay at her house near Hampton Court in 1641, angered by the visits of her lover Charles Rich.

In August 1646 she asked Charles Louis, son of Elizabeth, Queen of Bohemia, to write to his mother asking her to take her daughter Kate Killigrew as a maid of honour in her household, and then sent Kate to The Hague with his letter of recommendation.

Thomas Stafford died in 1655 and Lady Stafford considered moving to Maastricht or The Hague, possibly with her son Thomas Killigrew and his second wife Charlotte van Hesse. Huygens thought she would not find the conversation, pictures, performances, or music she enjoyed at Maastricht.

She died in 1656 and left a will. She wished to buried in the chapel of her own house at the Savoy on the Strand.

== Family ==
Mary Woodhouse married:

(1) Sir Robert Killigrew, their children included;

- William Killigrew (1606–1695)
- Henry Killigrew (playwright), married Judith [?], their children included the poet Anne Killigrew.
- Thomas Killigrew, (7 February 1612 - 1683), married in 1638 Cecilia Crofts (d. 1638), a maid of honour to Henrietta Maria.
- Anne Killigrew, (1607- 8 July 1641); appointed dresser to Henrietta Maria in 1637; married George Kirke groom of the chamber; drowned at London Bridge; subject of Robert Heath's Epicedium on the Beautiful Lady Mrs A. K. unfortunately drowned by chance in the Thames in passing the Bridge, Henry King's An Elegy upon Mrs. Kirk unfortunately drowned in Thames, and her niece Anne Killigrew's On my Aunt Mrs A. K. drown'd under London-bridge in the Queen's Bardge Anno 1641.
- Elizabeth Killigrew, who married Francis Boyle, 1st Viscount Shannon, and was the mother of Charlotte FitzRoy, Countess of Yarmouth (d. 1684).
- Kate Killigrew (d. 1654), maid of honour or gentlewoman to Elizabeth Queen of Bohemia from 1646, died of smallpox.
- Catherine Killigrew
- Mary Killigrew, (1623-1677), married Sir John Jeames, a descendant of the lords of Haestricht in Holland.

(2) Sir Thomas Stafford (MP)
