= 1666 in literature =

This article contains information about the literary events and publications of 1666.

== Events ==
- June 4 – Molière's comedy of manners Le Misanthrope is premièred at the Théâtre du Palais-Royal (rue Saint-Honoré) in Paris by the King's Players (Troupe du Roi).
- July – Aphra Behn goes to Antwerp to work as a government spy.
- August 6 – Molière's comedy Le Médecin malgré lui ("The doctor in spite of himself") is premièred at the Théâtre du Palais-Royal in Paris by the King's Players with Molière himself playing the title character, Sganarelle.
- September 2 – Samuel Pepys begins recording details of the Great Fire of London in his diary. The destruction of Old St Paul's Cathedral in the conflagration also destroys the stock of many London publishers, which is stored in the crypt. This probably includes unsold copies of the Third Folio of Shakespeare's works (1663).

== New books ==
=== Prose ===
- Nicolas Boileau-Despréaux – Satires du Sieur D....
- Margaret Cavendish, Duchess of Newcastle-upon-Tyne –
  - A Description of a New World Called the Blazing-World
  - Observations upon Experimental Philosophy
- John Bunyan – Grace Abounding to the Chief of Sinners
- Thomas Hobbes – De principiis et ratiocinatione geometrarum
- Gottfried Leibniz – De Arte Combinatoria ('On the Art of Combination')

=== Drama ===
- James Howard – The English Monsieur
- William Killigrew – The Siege of Urbin (published)
- Molière
  - Le Médecin malgré lui
  - Le Misanthrope
- Juan de Zabaleta – El emperador Commodo

== Births ==
- March 21 – Ogyū Sorai, Japanese Confucian philosopher (died 1728)
- July 10 – John Ernest Grabe, German-born English theologian (died 1711)
- August 13
  - René Massuet, French patrologist (died 1716)
  - William Wotton, English theologian, classicist and translator (died 1727)
- November 12 – Mary Astell, English feminist writer (died 1731)
- Unknown dates
  - Josiah Burchett, English writer on history and Admiralty official (died 1746)
  - Mary Pix, English novelist and dramatist (died 1709)
- Probable year of birth – John Harris, English encyclopedist (died 1719)

== Deaths ==
- June 16 – Sir Richard Fanshawe, 1st Baronet, English Royalist politician, diplomat, poet and translator (born 1608)
- June 30 – Alexander Brome, English humorous poet and translator (born 1620)
- August 24 – Dom Francisco Manuel de Mello, Portuguese writer (born 1608)
- October 29 – James Shirley, English dramatist (born 1596)
- November – Jeremias de Dekker, Dutch poet (born c. 1610)
- Unknown dates
  - Gysbert Japiks, Frisian writer (born 1603)
  - Song Yingxing, Chinese encyclopedist (born 1587)
