= Thomas Stafford (MP) =

English courtier, politician and historian

Sir Thomas Stafford (c. 1574 – 1655) was an English courtier, politician, and historian of the Irish Wars. He sat in the House of Commons at various times between 1593 and 1625.

Stafford was the illegitimate son of Sir George Carew. In 1593, he was elected Member of Parliament for Weymouth and Melcombe Regis. He was knighted in 1611. By 1619 he was a Gentleman Usher of the Privy Chamber to Queen Anne. In 1621, he was elected MP for Helston. He was elected MP for Bodmin in 1624. He was also Gentleman Usher to Queen Henrietta Maria.

Stafford married Lady Mary Killigrew (floruit 1621–55), widow of Sir Robert Killigrew of St. Margaret Lothbury, London, and daughter of Sir Henry Woodhouse of Waxham, after 1633. She was also the niece of Sir Francis Bacon, a friend of John Donne, and Sir Constantijn Huygens.

Stafford's will was made in 1653 and proved by his widow in February 1655. He was buried in the same tomb as the Earl of Totnes in the Church of the Holy Trinity, Stratford-upon-Avon, with a Latin inscription mentioning military service in Ireland.

Parliament of England
Preceded by Robert Gregory; Arthur Messenger; William Hody	Member of Parliament for Weymouth and Melcombe Regis; 1593; With: William Weston; Arthur Messenger; Thomas Stevens	Succeeded by Richard Swayne; Francis Leigh; John Mockett; John Brooke
Preceded by Sir Robert Killigrew; Henry Bulstrode	Member of Parliament for Helston; 1621–1622; With: William Noy	Succeeded by Thomas Carey; Francis Carew
Preceded by Sir John Trevor; James Bagge, junior	Member of Parliament for Bodmin; 1624; With: Charles Berkeley	Succeeded by Henry Jermyn; Robert Caesar
