= Portrait of Sir William Killigrew =

Portrait by Anthony van Dyck

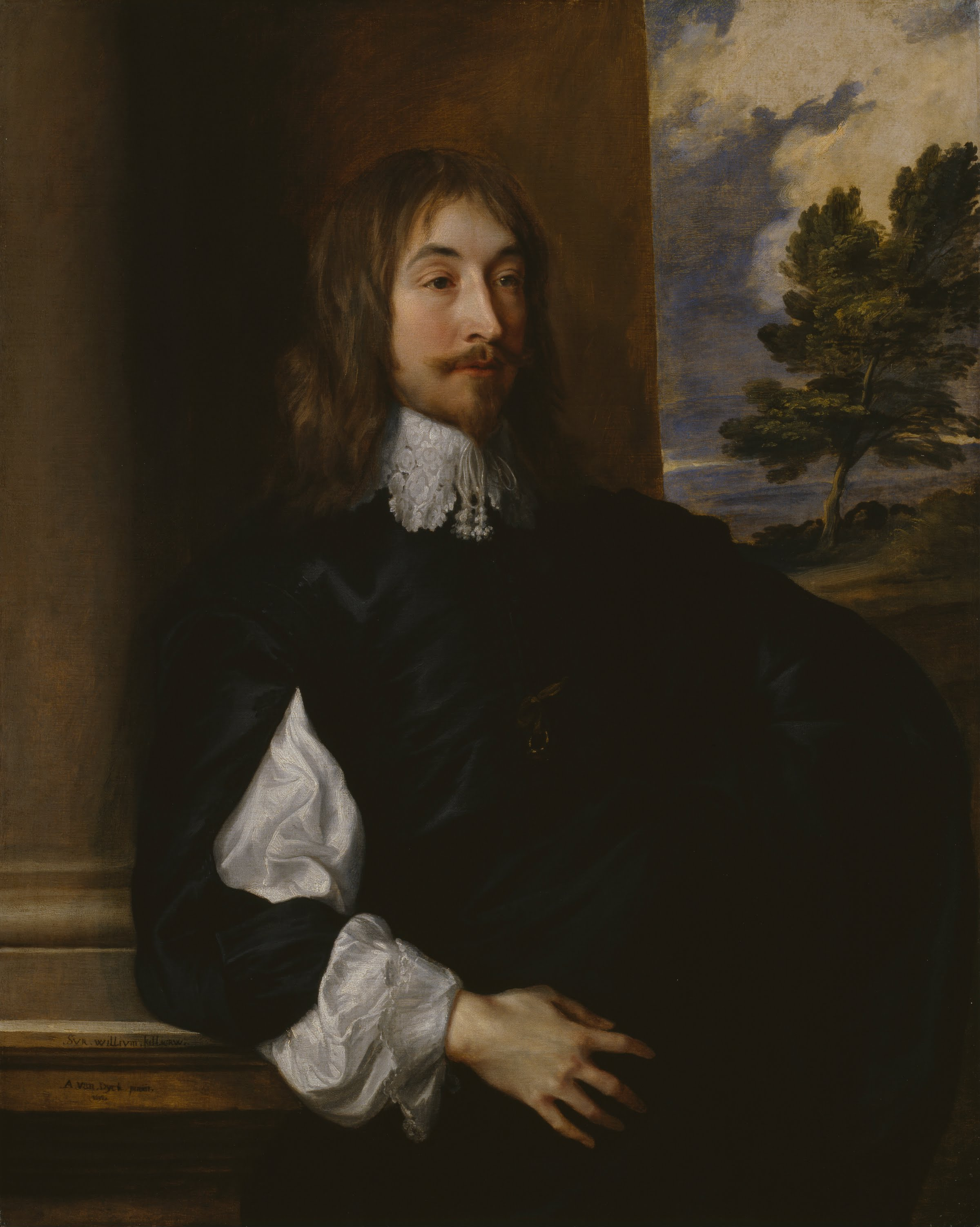
- Artist: Anthony van Dyck
- Completion date: 1638
- Movement: Baroque
- Subject: Sir William Killigrew
- Dimensions: 1052 x 841 mm
- Location: Tate Gallery, London
- Owner: Tate
- Website: www.tate.org.uk/art/artworks/van-dyck-portrait-of-sir-william-killigrew-t07896

Sir William Killigrew is a 1638 Baroque portrait of Sir William Killigrew (1606–1695) by the Flemish artist Anthony van Dyck. The portrait is twinned with another of his wife, Mary Hill.

== The painting ==
The portrait is dated 1638, a time when Sir William Killigrew was involved with partners in an attempt to drain the Lincolnshire fens, an immensely expensive undertaking which caused the family great economic distress, but which did not prevent their commissioning a set of husband and wife portraits. The Tate Gallery in London acquired the painting in the year 2002, and acquired van Dyck's Portrait of Mary Hill, Lady Killigrew, also dated 1638, in the year 2003. This acquisition brought together the pair of portraits for the first time in over 150 years.

The portrait depicts the Sir William facing the viewer, leaning against the base of a column. The subject is wearing a black satin jacket with a white lace collar. There is a gold ring tied to his jacket by a black ribbon, the symbolic meaning of which is uncertain.

Van Dyck painted a number of portraits of various members of the Killigrew family during his stay in England. These include Thomas Killigrew and an Unknown Gentleman, now located in the Royal Collection.

== See also ==
- List of paintings by Anthony van Dyck
