= Henry Killigrew =

Henry Killigrew may refer to:

- Henry Killigrew (diplomat) (1528–1603), English diplomat and ambassador
- Henry Killigrew (playwright) (1613–1700), wrote Pallantus and Eudora
- Henry Killigrew (Royal Navy officer) (died 1712), Lord of Admiralty and son of the playwright
