= William Hooke (minister) =

English Puritan clergyman

William Hooke or Hook (1600–1677) was an English Puritan clergyman, in New England for nearly two decades, mostly at New Haven.

== Life ==
Coat of Arms of William Hooke

Hooke was the second son of William Hook of Hook, Hampshire. He became commoner of Trinity College, Oxford, in 1618, and graduated B.A. in 1620. He only matriculated in the university just before taking his degree. He proceeded M.A. in 1623.

Taking holy orders, Hooke became vicar of Upper Clatford, Hampshire in 1627. In 1632 he was made vicar of Axmouth in Devon and was known as a Puritan. According to Anthony Wood, Jerom Turner, a well-known puritan minister, was his assistant there from about 1638 to 1640; in the latter year he probably emigrated to New England. In America he preached as an Independent. At first, he was minister to the newly founded settlement at Taunton, Massachusetts, where he was associated with Nicholas, and was the friend of Wilson and Mather. Hooke's Church is now represented by the West Taunton Church. In 1644 or 1645 he removed to New Haven, where he became teacher, the pastor being John Davenport.

In 1656 Hooke returned to England and became one of the Protector's chaplains at Whitehall. He was made Master of the Savoy in 1658, which that year hosted the conference that produced the Savoy Declaration.

On 7 August 1659 Hooke preached at Whitehall; and he with the other chaplains had a special place at the Protector's funeral in September. In the same year the London independents wrote to George Monck, then in the north, inquiring as to the toleration likely to be extended them in the future. Monck addressed a reply to Hooke and other well-known preachers.

After the Restoration Hooke kept in touch with the independents of New England. Samuel Wilson Taylor, when arrested on his way to New England, on 3 April 1664, confessed that news-books and letters found upon him had been given to him by Hooke for delivery in New England. By then Hooke was living underground in London, hosting a covert diplomatic meeting of John Winthrop the Younger. In 1672 he became a licensed minister at Spitalfields.

Hooke died on 21 March 1677, and was buried in Bunhill Fields, London.

== Works ==
In 1641 appeared in London Hooke's sermon New England's Teares for Old England's Feares,’ which was preached on 23 July 1640, a "day of public humiliation". In 1653 he sent Oliver Cromwell an account of affairs in New England. It was printed in the Thurloe State Papers.

Hooke was joint author with John Davenport of A Catechisme containing the chief heads of Christian Religion, published at the desire and for the use of the Church of Christ at New Haven (London 1659; in New Haven probably several years earlier). Hooke also joined with Joseph Caryl in editing Davenport's devotional work, The Saints Anchor-Hold in all Storms and Tempests, London, 1661.

== Family ==
Hooke's wife, Jane Hooke was daughter of Richard Whalley and Frances Cromwell, sister to Edward Whalley the regicide, and cousin to Oliver Cromwell. She returned to England in 1654, with eight children.

John Hooke (1634–1710), son of William Hooke, was also an independent preacher, and accompanied his father to New England, but returned to England before him. The Protector showed him some favour. In 1663 he was made chaplain of the Savoy by Henry Killigrew and was in post in 1702 when the hospital was dissolved by the lord-keeper Wright. He was at the time a minister at Basingstoke, where he died in 1710.

== Notes ==
Attribution

This article incorporates text from a publication now in the public domain: Lee, Sidney, ed. (1891). "Hook, William". Dictionary of National Biography. Vol. 27. London: Smith, Elder & Co.
