= Portrait of Mary Hill, Lady Killigrew =

Portrait by Anthony van Dyck

Portrait of Mary Hill, Lady Killgrew
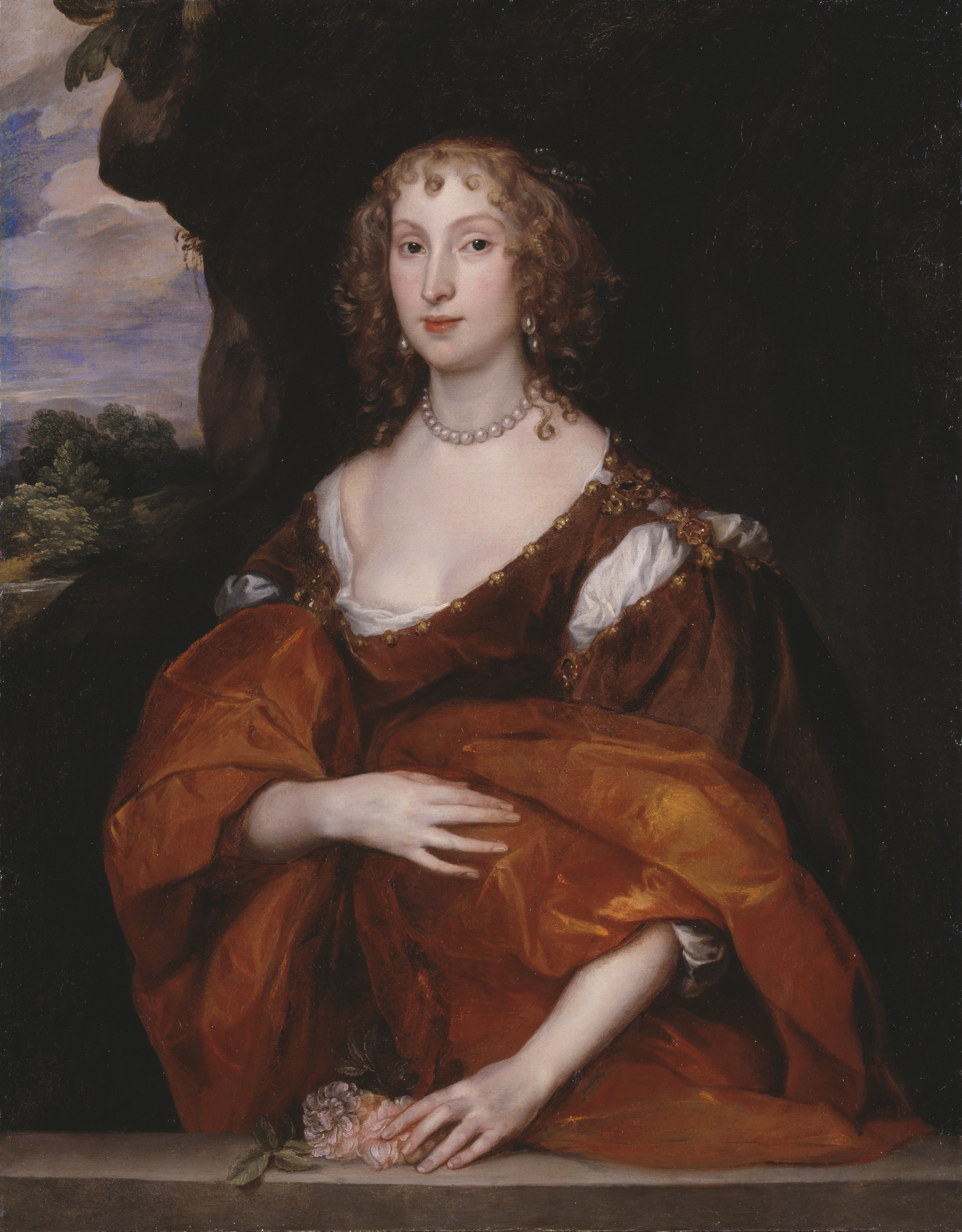
- Artist: Anthony van Dyck
- Year: 1638
- Movement: Baroque
- Subject: Mary Hill, Lady Killgrew
- Dimensions: 1065 x 833 mm
- Location: Tate Gallery, London, England
- Owner: Tate
- Website: www.tate.org.uk/art/artworks/van-dyck-portrait-of-mary-hill-lady-killigrew-t07956

Portrait of Mary Hill, Lady Killgrew is a 1638 Baroque portrait by the Flemish artist Anthony van Dyck. The portrait is twinned with another of the Lady's husband, William Killigrew.

== Subject ==
Mary Hill, from Honiley, Warwickshire was the wife of Sir William Killigrew, a courtier to King Charles I and later a noted playwright. The dates of her birth and death are unknown. The couple was known to have had seven children. At the time of the English Civil War (1642-1651), the couple was reduced to poverty and forced to flee the country, living separately for several years. They were reunited at the time of The Restoration in 1660, at which time Sir William regained his position at Court and Lady Mary became dresser to the dowager Queen Henrietta-Maria.

== The painting ==
The portrait is dated 1638, a time when Sir William Killigrew was involved with partners in an attempt to drain the Lincolnshire fens, an immensely expensive undertaking which caused the family great economic distress, but which did not prevent their commissioning a set of husband and wife portraits. The Tate Gallery in London acquired van Dyck's Portrait of Sir William Killigrew, also dated 1638, in the year 2002. The portrait of his wife was acquired from a different source in 2003. This acquisition brought together the pair of portraits for the first time in over 150 years.

The portrait depicts the Lady Killigrew facing the viewer, and standing on a stone parapet. The subject is wearing a russet colored gown, cut low, with the edges of a white shift underneath. With regards to symbolism, van Dyck was known to have introduced a number of contemporary elements into English portrait-painting. The roses which the subject is touching allude to a happy marriage, and the bare rocks on the background symbolize constancy.

Another portrait of Mary Hill, Lady Killigrew, "after Sir Anthony Van Dyck" is located in the collection of Belton House, Lincolnshire (now part of the National Trust).

== See also ==
- List of paintings by Anthony van Dyck
