= Henry Woodhouse (colonial administrator) =

Governor of Bermuda
- In office October 1623 – 13 January 1627
- Preceded by: Captain John Bernard
- Succeeded by: Captain Philip Bell

Personal details
- Born: 1573 Winterton, Norfolk, England
- Died: 1637 (aged 63–64) Waxham, Norfolk, England
- Occupation: Soldier

Henry Woodhouse (1573–1637) was Governor of Bermuda between 1623 and 1627.

== Early years ==
Henry Woodhouse was born in 1573 in Winterton, Norfolk, England. He was the son of Sir Henry Woodhouse and Anne, daughter of Sir Nicholas Bacon, Lord Keeper of the Great Seal. He had a son, also Henry. (Note: Their son was reportedly born in Bermuda in 1607. However a significant settlement was not made in Bermuda until 1609 by James I of England.) At the age of 30, Henry emigrated to Lower Norfolk County, Virginia. From 1647 to 1652 their son was a member of the Norfolk House of Burgesses and Commissioner of Norfolk.

== Governor of Bermuda ==
Woodhouse was governor of Bermuda from October 1623 to 13 January 1627. By the time Woodhouse became governor, it was clear that growing tobacco would never bring wealth. There was too little land and the crop was poor quality. Most of the early houses on the islands were wooden with palmetto thatch roofs. In 1625 The Somers Islands Company, which owned the island, ordered their tenants on Bermuda to "build houses of stone upon the publique land", but Woodhouse told them that would be "a taske too hard to be undertaken."

The sea might provide a living, although efforts at whaling gave disappointing results. In 1625 Woodhouse reported to the Company, "I have made assay in chasing the whales 3 or 4 days together but without good successe they were so shie that they will not abide our boats to come up with them." By 1626 the aristocratic English leaders involved in colonization were expecting to obtain assent to establish a West India Company and to engage in war against Spain. The Company wrote to Woodhouse telling him of the "purpose and consultation by so many of his company ... to raise a stock to furnish out some ships of war for the defense of the island and for the West Indian coast, which [ships] shall make their rendezvous to and from the Somers Island."

In 1624, Woodhouse told the overseers of the colony to watch for "the hard usage of any maisters towards their servants", and to ensure the servants had sufficient "victuall, apparell, lodgeing and necessaries convenient for them." In 1626, Margaret Heyling stole a turkey and was ordered to make public penance in church for six months. At her trial, a first jury found was fined and imprisoned for giving a "not guilty" verdict. A second jury ordered that she should be whipped, although this punishment was remitted. The next year the Somers Island Company found that her punishment had been unjust, and ordered Woodhouse to pay her 100 pounds of tobacco in compensation. When Woodhouse's successor, Captain Philip Bell, reached Bermuda, he found Captain Woodhouse facing an attack by the Bermuda assembly for his actions while in office. Bell advised Woodhouse to leave Bermuda as soon as possible, but Woodhouse refused and was censured and fined, then thrown in prison when he refused to apologize." He has been described as tyrannical and arbitrary, but has been defended as required to enforce the law.

== Later career ==
Between 1627 and 1628 Woodhouse served in the Siege of Saint-Martin-de-Ré and in attempts to relieve the Siege of La Rochelle. He was appointed master of the muster of Suffolk county, England, and in 1631 King Charles I of England promised him the governorship of Virginia. In 1634 and 1635 Woodhouse petitioned the king to fulfill his promise. In 1634, Woodhouse took a 99-year lease of 6 shares of land (150 acres (61 ha)) in Hamilton tribe of Bermuda from his nephew, Sir William Killigrew. The rent was nominal—100 oranges, 100 lemons and 100 potatoes, payable at the Feast of the Annunciation of the Blessed Virgin Mary—but he did not keep up the payments. In 1637, Killigrew reclaimed the land. Henry Woodhouse died in 1637 in Waxham, Norfolk, England.
