= George Kirke =

Scottish-born courtier and Member of Parliament (died 1675)

George Kirke (died 1675) was a Scottish-born courtier and Member of Parliament for Clitheroe.

He was a son of George Kirke, a servant of James VI of Scotland. George Kirke senior was keeper of the chamber door to Prince Charles in Scotland at Dunfermline Palace and was given a pension for his long service, with other servants of the Prince in March 1605.

== Career ==
George Kirke, younger, was a page to Prince Henry. He became a Groom of the Chamber to Prince Charles in 1613. Kirke went to Spain in 1623 during Prince Charles' Spanish Match. The goldsmith George Heriot, who died in 1623, bequeathed to him either a diamond or piece of gold or silver plate worth £50.

He continued as a groom of the bedchamber to King Charles and gentleman of the robes. His accounts detail purchases of fabric and tailoring for the king. Kirke received £5000 to procure costumes for Love's Triumph Through Callipolis (1631) and possibly Albion's Triumph (1632). He accounting was criticised by William George. Kirke provided costume for the masque Coelium Britannicum in February 1634, and bought diamonds and pearls for robes worn on St George's day 1639.

A royal gift of lands at Gillingham, Dorset, at first held jointly with a courtier colleague James Fullerton, proved troublesome when tenants protested at their enclosures and improvements.

In 1662, he was made keeper of Whitehall Palace. He went to Spain with Prince Charles during the Spanish match of 1623. King James wrote that "Kirke and Gabriel" would bring additional jewels to Charles and Buckingham including Georges and garters, insignia of the royal order.

The court jeweller George Heriot bequeathed him a piece of silver plate or a diamond worth 50 marks Sterling.

He has been suggested as the author "G. K." of a poem addressed to Venetia Stanley, the wife of Kenelm Digby, "A Breef and Mysticall description of the Fayre and Statelye Venetia".

His, or his father's, eligibility as a Scot to sit as a Member of Parliament for Clitheroe in 1626 was challenged. George Kirke, gentleman of the robes, was naturalized as a denizen of England.

He died on 20 May 1675 and was buried at St Margaret's, Westminster.

== Marriages and children ==
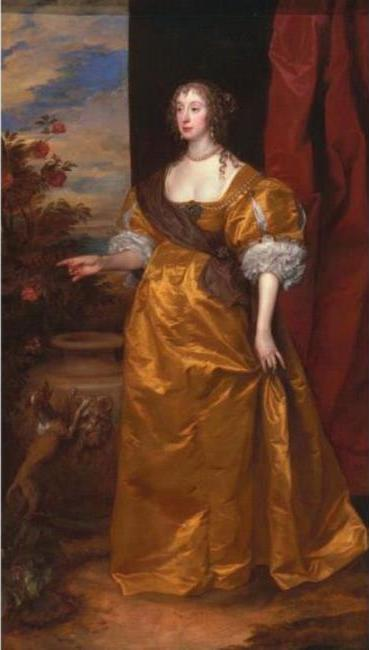
Anne Killigrew, Mrs Kirke, by Anthony van Dyck, Huntington

Kirke married Anne Killigrew (1607-1641), daughter of Sir Robert Killigrew and Mary Woodhouse. In January 1633 she played the part of Camena in Walter Montagu's Shepherd's Paradise. She was appointed a dresser to Henrietta Maria in 1637. She was painted by Anthony van Dyck twice.

Anne Kirke drowned at London Bridge on 6 July 1641. This tragedy was the subject of several poems including; Robert Heath's Epicedium on the Beautiful Lady Mrs A. K. unfortunately drowned by chance in the Thames in passing the Bridge, Henry King's An Elegy upon Mrs. Kirk unfortunately drowned in Thames, her niece Anne Killigrew's On my Aunt Mrs A. K. drown'd under London-bridge in the Queen's Bardge Anno 1641, and elegies by Henry Glapthorne and Constantijn Huygens.

Their children included:

- Charles Kirke, who claimed the keepership of Nonsuch Palace in 1650
- Lucy Hamilton Sandys (Lucie Saunders), (d. 1687), who was a witness to Nell Gwyn's will.

In 1646 he married Mary Townshend, daughter of Aurelian Townshend. King Charles is said to have given him a lace collar, a handkerchief, and a night cap as a wedding present. Their children included:

- Percy Kirke (d. 1691), who married Mary or Elizabeth Howard, a daughter of George Howard, 4th Earl of Suffolk. He was commander of a regiment known as "Kirke's lambs"
- Philip Kirke
- Diana Kirke, who married Aubrey de Vere, 20th Earl of Oxford
- Mary or "Mall" Kirke, who was a maid of honour to Mary of Modena
