= Anne Killigrew (lady-in-waiting) =

Lady-in-waiting to Charles I (1607–1641)

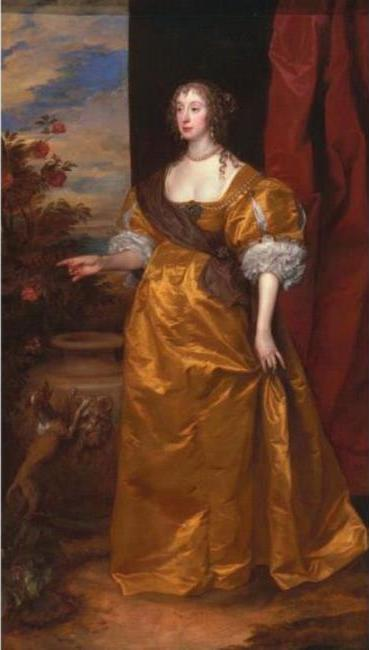
- Baptised: 7 September 1607
- Died: 6 July 1641
- Spouse: George Kirke
- Children: Charles Kirke
- Parents: Robert Killigrew (father); Mary Woodhouse (mother)

Anne Killigrew (baptised 7 September 1607, died 6 July 1641) was a Lady in Waiting to Queen Henrietta Maria, and the first wife of George Kirke (died 1675) who was Groom of the Chamber to Charles I of England.

== Early life ==
Anne Killigrew was the eldest daughter of Sir Robert Killigrew and Mary Woodhouse. Her parents had twelve children, seven of them girls. Anne Killigrew was baptized on 7 September 1607 at Hanworth, in what was then Middlesex.

== Marriage and life at court ==
Charles I of England may have helped to arrange her marriage to George Kirke, his Groom of the Chamber. The king attended their wedding, on 4 January 1627, and gave the couple an 80-year lease on the royal manor of Sheriff Hutton, Yorkshire. George Kirke retained the tenancy until 1650.

Anne's children include:

- Charles Kirke (1633–74), christened on 4 September 1633 at St Martin-in-the-Fields, Westminster.
- George Kirke (b. 27 January 1635) at Sunbury, near Hampton Court, died in infancy.
- Baby daughter, buried 23 May 1640, Westminster Abbey.

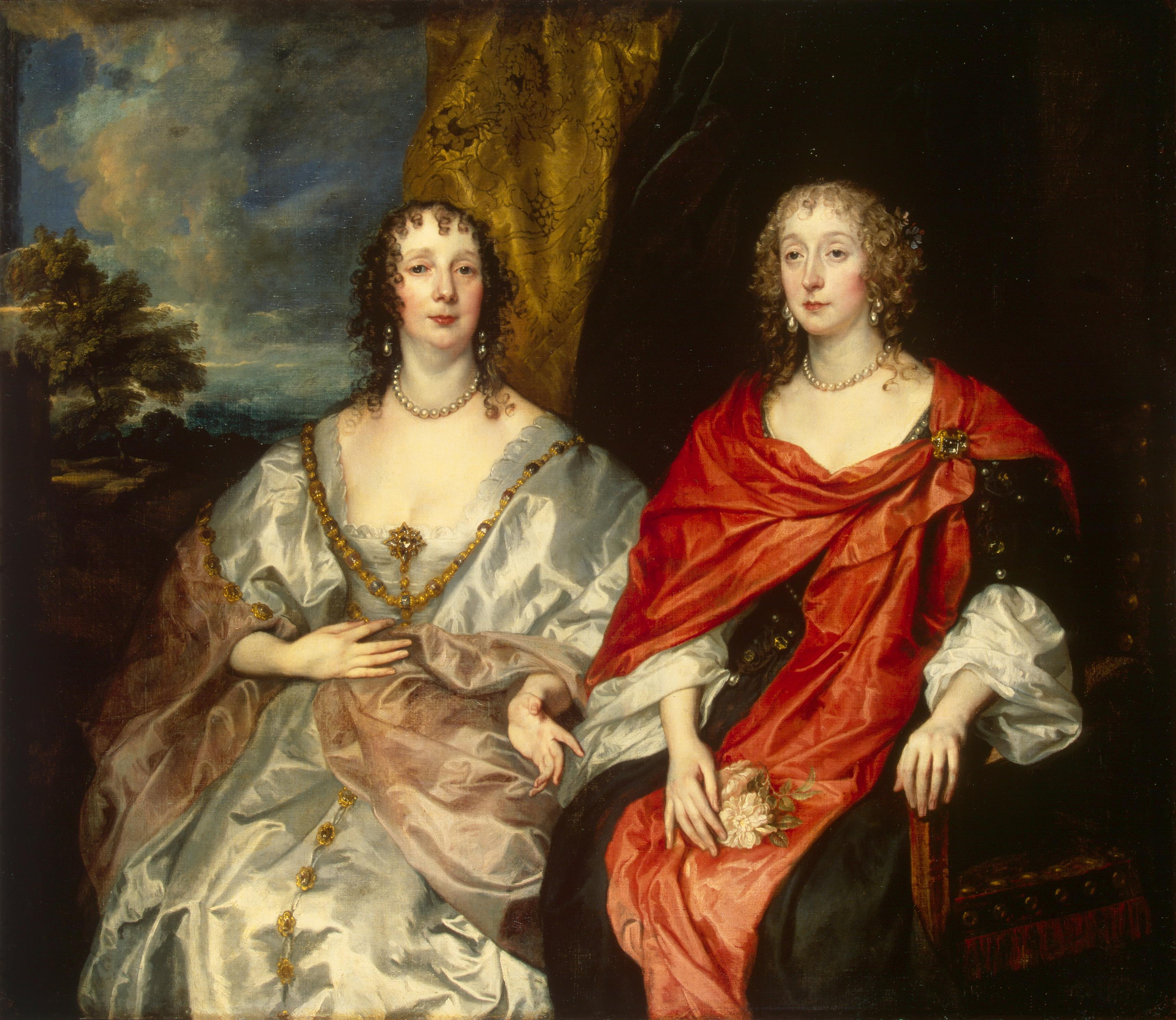
Portrait of Ladies-in-Waiting to Queen Henrietta Maria, Anne Killigrew seated on the right, by Anthony van Dyck

A number of Anne's relatives held positions in the royal household, and Anne herself became a maid-of-honour to Queen Henrietta Maria in 1631. In January 1633 Anne took the part of Camena in Walter Montagu's Shepherd's Paradise, an amusement in which the Queen and a number of her ladies took speaking parts. Her niece, also called Anne Killigrew was also a lady-in-waiting.

Anne Kirke was appointed a dresser to Henrietta Maria in April 1637, Sophia Carew had been a rival for the position.

She is known to have been painted twice by Anthony van Dyck, once standing by herself and once seated with a fellow lady-in-waiting, variously suggested to be Anne Dalkeith or Charlotte, Lady Strange, Later Countess of Derby.

== Accidental death ==
Anne Kirke drowned at London Bridge on 6 July 1641, in an accident in which the royal barge capsized. The rest of the passengers were rescued, including Lord Denbigh, his daughter Elizabeth, Lady Kinalmeaky, and Lady Cornwallis. Thomas Wiseman wrote, "The Court is very sad by reason of a great mishap happened to a barge coming through London Bridge, wherein were diverse ladies, and amongst the rest Mrs Kirke drowned. The barge fell on a piece of timber across the lock, and so was cast away. Lady Cornwallis, it is thought will not live". Some reports explained the barge was "shooting the bridge" a phrase used for traversing the rapid water.

Anne was buried in Westminster Abbey on 9 July 1641. It was reported that Queen Henrietta Maria, who had not been on the royal barge at the time of the accident, had "taken very heavily the news, and, they say, shed tears for her."

This tragedy was the subject of several poems including; Robert Heath's Epicedium on the Beautiful Lady Mrs A. K. unfortunately drowned by chance in the Thames in passing the Bridge, Henry King's An Elegy upon Mrs. Kirk unfortunately drowned in Thames, and elegies by Henry Glapthorne and Constantijn Huygens.

Anne Killigrew's brother Henry Killigrew (1613–1700) named his daughter, the future poet and painter Anne Killigrew (1660–1685). She composed the poem On my Aunt Mrs A. K. drown'd under London-bridge in the Queen's Bardge Anno 1641, published in Poems (1686).
