= Laux Maler =

Renaissance luthier

Laux Maler or Laux Mahler or Lucas Maller (1485–1552) was a renaissance luthier specialising in lutes, from Füssen, Germany. He worked in Bologna, Italy.

Lutes made by Laux Maler were highly prized by musicians in the seventeenth century. In April 1645 Constantijn Huygens tried to obtain a nine rib Laux Maler lute from Jacques Gaultier, a lutenist at the court of Charles I of England. Gaultier said there were only fifty extant, six in London, of medium size and not suitable to accompany a singer. Soon after Gaultier found one of the larger size, recently rebuilt in London by a Master Nichols. Huygens had the lute sent to him on approval, but did not buy it. In 1649 Charles I gave Gaultier another Laux Maler lute, formerly belonging to the royal lutenist John Ballard. Gaultier offered this lute to Huygens, and sent it to The Hague but could not secure an expert recommendation for it from their mutual friend Mary Woodhouse.
