= James Killigrew =

British Royal Navy captain

Captain James Killigrew
- Died: 1695
- Occupation: Royal Navy captain

James Killigrew (died 1695) was a British Royal Navy captain.

== Biography ==
Killigrew was the son of Henry Killigrew, D.D., and brother of Admiral Henry Killigrew, was appointed lieutenant of the Portsmouth on 5 September 1688. On 11 April 1690 he was promoted to be captain of the Sapphire, was employed in her cruising in the Channel, and in July 1691 captured a large French privateer. In 1692 he commanded the York, in 1693 the Crown, from which he was moved into the Plymouth of 60 guns, and sent with Admiral Russell to the Mediterranean. In January 1694–5 he was cruising to the southward of Sardinia in command of a detached squadron of five ships, when, on the 18th, they sighted two French men-of-war, the Content of 60, and the Trident of 52 guns. In the chase the Plymouth, being far ahead of her consorts, closed with and engaged the enemy. She was much over-matched, and suffered severely. Killigrew and many of his men were killed. But the French ships had been delayed till the other English ships came up, and, being unable to escape, were both captured. They were taken into Messina, and were afterwards added to the English navy. The question was afterwards raised by his brother, the admiral, whether his estate was not entitled to share in the prize-money, and evidence was adduced to the effect that the two French ships were disabled and virtually beaten by the Plymouth's fire. Russell, who was commander-in-chief in the Mediterranean at the time, presided over the admiralty, and he decided that as Killigrew was killed early in the action, and the Plymouth was beaten off by the French ships, the prize-money was payable only to the captains of the Carlisle, Falmouth, and Adventure, which actually took them. Although presumably in accordance with the regulations of the day, such an award now appears unjust.
