= William Killigrew =

William Killigrew may refer to:

- William Killigrew (1606–1695), English courtier
- William Killigrew (Chamberlain of the Exchequer) (died 1622), English politician
- Sir William Killigrew, 1st Baronet (died 1665), of the Killigrew baronets
