= Ralph Jackson (priest) =

English clergyman

Ralph Jackson (died 1559) was an English 16th-century clergyman who served as Master of the Savoy.

Jackson was educated at Christ's College, Cambridge, matriculating at Michaelmas 1549.

Previously vice-master of the Savoy Hospital, Jackson was appointed Master on 9 June 1553, but was immediately (the surrender dated 10 June) required to surrender the hospital to King Edward VI, the assets to be transferred to the new hospital of Bridewell Palace. Queen Mary restored the hospital, and Jackson as Master, by royal warrant on 15 June 1556.

He was presented to a canonry at Canterbury Cathedral in 1554, and was Rector of St Clement Danes Church 1557–1559.

He died in 1559.
