= Goldsmith banker =

Business role in 17th-century London

A goldsmith banker was a business role that emerged in seventeenth century London from the London goldsmiths where they gradually expanded their services to include storage of wealth, providing loans, transferring money and providing bills of exchange that would lead to the development of cheques. Some of the concepts were brought over from Amsterdam where goldsmiths would provide gold storage and issue chits that started to be used as a means of exchange. The goldsmith banker became a key development in the history of banking that would lead to modern banking.

== History ==
Their emergence was gradual: exchanging goldsmiths, who dealt in coinage, started to become recognised as carrying out a different activity from a working goldsmith in the 1630s. Prior to that date banking in London was principally carried out by foreigners, generally Italians, Germans, and the Dutch. However this innovation led to an indigenous banking tradition. The seizure of bullion held on safe deposit at the Tower of London by Charles I in 1640 created anxiety about the safe storage of valuables, which was further increased during the English Civil War, which also disrupted the regular work of the working goldsmiths. They soon developed accountancy practices to keep track of deposits. Then they also started paying interest on deposits so they could loan out increasing quantities of gold. The depositor was given a receipt with their name and the amount of the deposit. Such receipts became negotiable and thus evolved into the bank note.

Whereas before the Civil War the London goldsmith bankers had largely been creditors, following the restoration in 1660 they became the biggest debtors in England. As the system evolved, the goldsmith bankers developed a form of Fractional reserve banking, which whilst still restricted as individuals, enabled them as a group to create credit out of thin air.

In the 1660s George Downing, the Secretary to the Treasury, implemented a project outlined by Sir William Killigrew to side-step the power of the Goldsmith bankers. In A proposal, shewing how this nation may be vast gainers by all the sums of money, given to the Crown, . . . (1663) Killigrew had advocated that the government issue £2m in transferable bonds, with the interest being covered by a yearly tax of £300k. The bonds would be for denominations between £5 and £100, mostly in the smaller denominations. The state would provide a regulatory framework to avoid fraud and ensure they were accepted as legal tender. However, by 1672 most of the orders were in the hands of a handful of such bankers, and so ended up increasing their power.
