= The Siege of Urbin =

1664-1666 tragicomedy by Sir William Killigrew

- Original language: English
- Written by: William Killigrew (1606–1695)
- Setting: Pisa, Urbino

Premiere
- Date: 1665

The Siege of Urbin is a 1664-1666 tragicomedy by 17th century playwright Sir William Killigrew. The play is largely set in Urbino, anglicized as "Urbin". According to Theatre Historian Allardyce Nicoll, the play exists in three versions: "an early version, a revised version, and the final printed text of 1666". In a 1665 performance of the play, Anne Marshall starred as Celestina and a 15 year old Nell Gwyn performed the role of Melina. Tensions developed between the two actresses when male audience members preferred the latter's legs to those of the former, leading to one of the actresses stabbing the other onstage, "but not fatally".

The titular siege only occurs towards the end of the play.

== Plot ==
In order to escape a marriage to a man she does not love, Celestina and her maidservant, Melina, disguise themselves as men and flee their home in Pisa. She soon finds herself joining the court of the Duke of Urbin(o), where she is accompanied by her cousin Lorenzo, who fails to see through her disguise. Both Celestina and Lorenzo are targeted by courtiers who are envious of the favor they have found with the Duke, but their attempts at sabotage all fail. While the Duke plans to marry Celestina to his sister, he finds himself strangely attracted to the former himself. Celestina is secretly love with the Duke. Lorenzo is himself in love with the Duke's sister. After coming to the mistaken conclusion that Celestina is pursuing the Duke's sister romantically, Lorenzo feels betrayed. Celestina is injured in battle and her true sex is revealed as her wounds are being tended to; she and the Duke profess their love for each other.

== Scholarly reception ==
Scholar Jacqueline Pearson sees Celestina's character as part of a trend of "female warriors" in Restoration drama.
