= Carol Barash =

American literary scholar and storytelling mentor

Carol "Chaya" Barash (born October 16, 1958 in Bellefonte, PA) is an American author, entrepreneur, and former university professor at Princeton, University of Michigan, Rutgers, and Seton Hall University. In 2006 Barash became the first Director of Development, Alumni Relations, and Communications for Macaulay Honors College-CUNY. Barash left Macaulay to study storytelling with Murray Nossel and Narativ, developing the Moments Method® of communication, based on how stories work in the human brain to heal trauma and connect authentically with other people. In 2014 they founded Story2, raising convertible debt from TechStars, Kaplan Ventures and angel investors and developing patented software to support high school and college students in the college and career process.
