= Margaret J. M. Ezell =

American professor

Margaret J. M. Ezell is a distinguished professor at Texas A&M University and the Sara and John Lindsey Chair of Liberal Arts. Her scholarship focuses on late 17th- and early 18th-century literary culture, early modern women writers, history of authorship, reading and handwritten culture, feminist theory, digital cultures, and electronic media.

== Educational career ==
She received her PhD at Cambridge University and her BA with Honors in English and History at Wellesley College.

== Works ==
She is the author of several books including Writing Women's Literary History , The Patriarch's Wife , Social Authorship and the Advent of Print , and The Oxford English Literary History Volume v: 1645-1714: The Later Seventeenth Century . She has published articles in English Literary History and Shakespeare Studies. In 2011, she published an article in Modern Philology entitled "Elizabeth Isham's Books of Remembrance and Forgetting."

== Books ==
- The Oxford English Literary History: Volume V: 1645-1714: The Later Seventeenth Century. Oxford: Oxford University Press, 2017.
- "My Rare Wit Killing Sin": Poems of a Restoration Courtier, Anne Killigrew Toronto: Center for Renaissance and Reformation Studies/ ITER, 2013.
- Social Authorship and the Advert of Print. Baltimore: The Johns Hopkins University, 1999.
- With Katherine O'Brien O'Keeffe, Cultural Artifacts and the Production of Meaning: The Page, The Image, and The Body. Ann Arbor, MI: Univ. of Michigan Press, 1994.
- Writing Women's Literary History. Baltimore: The Johns Hopkins Press, 1993.
- The Patriarch's Wife: Literary Evidence and the History of the Family. Chapel Hill: University of North Carolina Press, 1987.
