= Henry Woodhouse (MP) =

English politician

Henry Woodhouse (c. 1545 – 8 October 1624), of Hickling and Waxham, Norfolk, was an English politician.

Woodhouse was the son of William Woodhouse and his first wife Anne Repps. He was born around 1545.

Woodhouse was a Member of Parliament (MP) for Norfolk in 1572 and 1589.

Woodhouse first married Anne Bacon, daughter of Nicholas Bacon. His second wife was Cecily Gresham, daughter of Thomas Gresham. His children included Henry Woodhouse, who was governor of Bermuda, and Mary Woodhouse.

Woodhouse died on 8 October 1624.
