= Henry Killigrew (Royal Navy officer) =

Royal Navy officer

Admiral Henry Killigrew
- Born: c.1652
- Died: 9 November 1712
- Military career
- Allegiance: Kingdom of Great Britain
- Branch: Royal Navy
- Service years: 1666–1694 (RN); 1702-1708 (MP)
- Rank: Admiral of the Blue
- Conflicts: St. James's Day Battle; Battle of Schooneveld; Battle of Solebay; Battle of Texel

Admiral Henry Killigrew (c. 1652 – 9 November 1712) was a Royal Navy officer who rose to the rank of Admiral of the Blue and was appointed a Lord Commissioner of the Admiralty and member of the Board of Admiralty. After retiring from the Royal Navy he pursued a career in politics and later became a Whig Member of Parliament.

== Naval career ==
Henry Killgrew entered the navy in 1666 at the rank of Lieutenant assigned to HMS Cambridge. He took part in the St. James's Day Battle. From 1667 until 1691 he remained in his rank serving on board HMS Sapphire and then HMS Constant Warwick. He was promoted to Captain on 9 January 1671 and took command of HMS Forester (1657) and took part at the Battle of Solebay. In June 1673 he was appointed Captain of HMS Bonaventure until August 1673 during this period he took part in the first and second Battles of Schooneveld and the Battle of Texel. On 17 August 1673 he was appointed Captain of HMS Monck until 6 April 1674. From 14 June 1674 until 16 May 1689 he was appointed Captain and Commanding Officer of ten more ships. In 1686 he appointed to the temporary rank of Commodore.

In June 1689 Killgrew was promoted Vice-Admiral of the Blue as flag officer of HMS Kent. On 17 February 1690 he advanced to Vice-Admiral of the Red and in May 1690 he was given command of the second rate HMS Duke. On 3 June 1690 he was promoted to Admiral of the Blue. In May 1692 he and his ship were present at the Battle of Barfleur he remained in command of HMS Duke until 1692. On 15 April 1693. He was suspected of Jacobite sympathies and not given a sea command after 1693 instead the First Lord of the Admiralty moved him to the Admiralty when he was appointed a Lords Commissioner of the Admiralty and served on the Board of Admiralty until 2 May 1694 after which he retired from the navy and moved into politics.

== Political career ==
He served as a Whig Member of Parliament for Stockbridge from 1702 to 1705 and for St Albans from 1705 to 1708, initially as a member of the Parliament of England, and then (following the Acts of Union in 1707) as a member of the Parliament of Great Britain.

== Family ==
He was the son of the playwright Henry Killigrew. He married Lucy, the daughter of Thomas Jervoise of Herriard, Hampshire, with whom he had a son and 3 daughters.

His brother James Killigrew was also in the Royal Navy.

Parliament of England
Preceded by Frederick Tylney; Anthony Burnaby	Member of Parliament for Stockbridge; 1702–1705; With: Anthony Burnaby	Succeeded by Sir John Hawles; Sir Edward Lawrence
Preceded by George Churchill; John Gape	Member of Parliament for St Albans; 1705–1707; With: George Churchill	Succeeded by Parliament of Great Britain
Parliament of Great Britain
Preceded by Parliament of England	Member of Parliament for St Albans; 1707–1708; With: George Churchill	Succeeded by John Gape; Joshua Lomax
Military offices
Preceded by The Earl of Pembroke	Colonel of the 2nd Maritime Regiment; 1691–1693	Succeeded by The Lord Berkeley of Stratton
