= Robert Killigrew =

English courtier and politician (1580–1633)

Sir Robert Killigrew
- Born: Robert Killigrew; 1580; Lothbury, London, England
- Died: 1633 (aged 52–53); Bath, Somerset, England
- Occupation: Chamberlain
- Title: Knight Bachelor
- Spouse: Mary Woodhouse

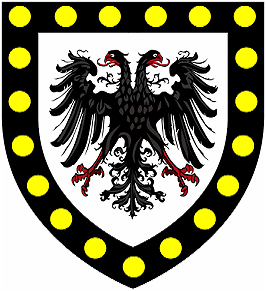
Arms of Killigrew: Argent, an eagle displayed with two heads sable a bordure of the second bezantée. The bezantée bordure indicates a connection to the ancient Earls of Cornwall

Sir Robert Killigrew (1580–1633) was an English courtier and politician who sat in the House of Commons at various times between 1601 and 1629. He served as Ambassador to the United Provinces.

== Life ==
Killgrew was born at Lothbury, London, the son of William Killigrew and his wife Margery (Mary) Saunders, daughter of Thomas Saunders of Uxbridge, Middlesex. In January 1591, he matriculated at Christ Church, Oxford at the age of 11. He travelled abroad in 1596 and may have become an official of the Privy Chamber in 1601. He was elected MP for St Mawes in 1601.

Killigrew was knighted by King James I in 1603. In 1604 he was elected MP for Newport. It is possible that he travelled to Jamestown in 1604. His name appears in the Second Charter of Virginia as a backer.

In January, 1606, Killigrew was a defender of Opinion against Truth in the Barriers at a Marriage at the wedding of Frances Howard and the Earl of Essex. In 1606 he was appointed ambassador to the United Provinces.

In June 1612, Killigrew was noted as "one of Carr's favourites" according to John Chamberlain. The following May, he was committed to the Fleet Prison for an unknown offence. Having become famous for his concoctions of drugs and cordials, he was at first suspected of complicity in the death of Sir Thomas Overbury in September 1613, but was subsequently officially exonerated.

In 1614, Killigrew was elected MP for Helston. On 12 May that year, he was involved in an altercation in the House of Commons. In July, he was appointed Keeper of Pendennis Castle, Falmouth, Cornwall, and a JP that same year. He is recorded as fighting a duel with Captain Burton in 1618. In October that year he was appointed an Officer of Protonotary of Chancery, and in December the following year was mentioned favourably by Buckingham.

In 1621, Killigrew was elected again MP for Newport. In 1622 he succeeded his father to become farmer of the profits from seals in King's bench and common pleas which was worth at least £560 a year. He was elected MP for Penryn and was appointed Deputy Lieutenant for Cornwall in 1624. In 1625 he was elected MP for Cornwall. He was also appointed Ambassador to the United Provinces in September 1625, but this was not taken up by December that year. In 1626, he was elected MP for Tregony in 1626. In 1628 he was elected MP for Bodmin and sat until 1629 when King Charles decided to rule without parliament for eleven years. He was appointed Vice-Chamberlain to Queen Henrietta Maria in 1630.

Killigrew was a knight of Arwenack in Falmouth, Cornwall. He died a wealthy man in 1633 in Bath, Somerset, with the probate of his will on 12 May.

== Family ==
He married Mary Woodhouse of Kimberley, Norfolk, (1584–1656), and they had several notable children:

1. William Killigrew (1606–1695)
2. Anne Killigrew (1607–1641), who married George Kirke
3. Robert Killigrew (1611-1???)
4. Thomas Killigrew (1612–1683)
5. Henry Killigrew (1613–1700)
6. Elizabeth Killigrew (c.1615-c.1619)
7. Catherine Killigrew (1618–1689), wife of Sir Thomas Stanley
8. Elizabeth Killigrew (1622–1681), wife of Francis Boyle, 1st Viscount Shannon, was a mistress of Charles II and bore him a daughter
9. Mary Killigrew (1623–1677), later wife of Sir John James, she has been confused in other biographies with Mary Sackville (1645–1679) (formerly Berkeley, née Bagot) — the widowed Countess of Falmouth — who was another mistress

Mary, his widow, married Sir Thomas Stafford after 1633. She was a correspondent of Constantijn Huygens.

Parliament of England
Preceded by Sir John Leigh; Robert Naunton	Member of Parliament for Helston; 1614; With: Henry Bulstrode	Succeeded by Sir Thomas Stafford; William Noy
