= Henry Killigrew (playwright) =

17th-century English chaplain and playwright

- Born: 11 February 1613; Hanworth, Middlesex, England
- Died: 14 March 1700 (aged 87); England
- Occupations: Playwright, clergyman
- Office: Master of the Savoy

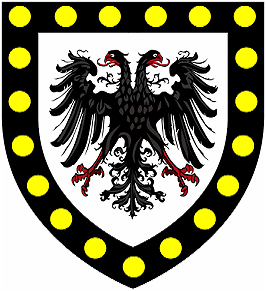
Arms of Killigrew: Argent, an eagle displayed with two heads sable a bordure of the second bezantée. The bezantée bordure indicates a connection to the ancient Earls of Cornwall

Henry Killigrew (11 February 1613 – 14 March 1700) was an English clergyman and playwright. He became a chaplain to Charles I, and chaplain and almoner to James, Duke of York (the future James II). Following the Restoration, he became Master of the Savoy.

== Life ==
Killigrew was born in Hanworth on 11 February 1613, the fifth and youngest son of Robert Killigrew and his wife Mary Woodhouse. He was the brother of the dramatist Thomas Killigrew and of Elizabeth Killigrew, Viscountess Shannon, mistress of the future Charles II.

He was educated at Cripplegate, London and at Christ Church, Oxford, graduating B.A. 1632, M.A. 1638, D.D. 1642.

He served as a chaplain in Charles I's army during the English Civil War and was chaplain to James, Duke of York (the future James II) during his time in exile. He was also appointed almoner to James, Duke of York. He served as a canon of Westminster Abbey in 1642 and from 1660 to his death and as rector of Wheathampstead.

In 1663, Henry Killigrew was appointed Master of the Savoy. According to some writers the final ruin of the Savoy Hospital was due to Killigrew's "improvidence, greed, and other bad qualities". A bill was passed in 1697 abolishing its privileges of sanctuary. The hospital was leased out in tenements, and the master appropriated the profits; among the leases granted was one (1699) to Henry Killigrew, the patentee of Drury Lane Theatre, for his lodgings in the Savoy, at a rent of 1 shilling per year for forty years. A commission appointed by William III reported that the relief of the poor (the hospital's intended purpose) was being utterly neglected. In 1702, shortly after Killigrew's death, the hospital was dissolved.

A juvenile play of his, The Conspiracy, was printed surreptitiously in 1638, and in an authenticated version in 1653 as Pallantus and Eudora.

=== Family ===
He married Judith and had four children:

- Henry Killigrew (died 1712), an admiral
- James Killigrew, also a naval officer, who was killed in an encounter with the French in January 1695 during the Nine Years' War
- Anne Killigrew (1660-1685), poet and painter, who was maid of honour to Mary of Modena (Duchess of York), and was the subject of an ode by Dryden, which Samuel Johnson thought the noblest in the language
- Elizabeth Killigrew (died 1701) married at Wheathampstead John Lambe, her father's curate, and produced 10 children
