= Waxham =

Village in Norfolk, England

Coordinates: 52.7788°N 1.6151°E

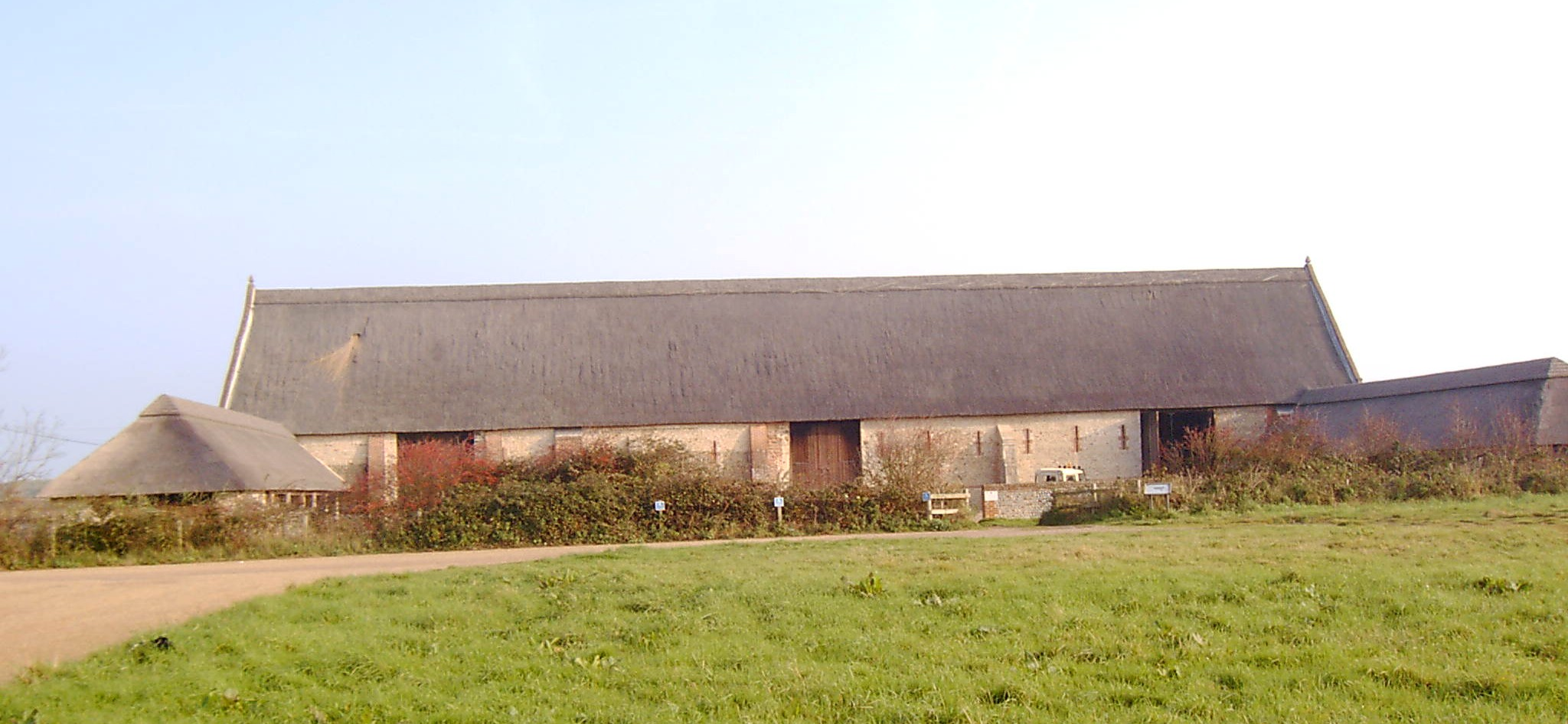
- Waxham Barn

- Location within Norfolk
- OS grid reference: TG439262
- Civil parish: Sea Palling
- District: North Norfolk
- Shire county: Norfolk
- Region: East
- Country: England
- Sovereign state: United Kingdom
- Post town: Norwich
- Postcode district: NR12

Waxham is a village and former civil parish, now in the parish of Sea Palling, in the North Norfolk district, on the north-east coast of the county Norfolk, England. Buildings in the village include Waxham Hall, the 14th-century St. John's Church and the 16th-century Waxham Great Barn. Waxham Hall is reputedly haunted by the ghosts of six members of the Brograve family, all of whom died in battle, and is said that an 18th-century owner of the house once invited them all to dinner. Waxham Great Barn (Listed Grade 1) built about 1570, at 178 feet long is one of the largest barns of its age in the country. It has recently been restored and opened to the public. The village has an extensive beach backed by dunes. Many migrant birds pass through the area in spring and autumn and common cranes feed in fields near the village.

== History ==
The village's name origin is uncertain 'Waegstan's homestead/village', or 'watch-stone homestead/village'. On 1 April 1935 the parish was abolished and merged with Palling. In 1931, the year of the last national census prior to the merger, the parish had a population of 84.

== Notable people ==
- Anne Townshend, benefactor, was born here in 1573.
- Henry Woodhouse (MP) (1545-1634)

== Lordship of Waxham ==
The Lordship of Waxham has a rich documented history that covers many centuries. Most feudal titles were created after the Norman invasion of England in 1066, but lordships pre-date this. It was held by St Benet's Abbey and Alan the Earl of Richmond a Breton noble who fought for Stephen of England. It then passed to the Ingham Family in the 12th Century, and eventually to Sir Oliver Ingham, who was governor of Ellesmere Castle in Shropshire and was summoned to various parliaments during the reign of Edward III. Sir Oliver acted as seneschal of Gascony and lord warden of the marches of guien in 1345, and raised an army to recover the county of Agnois from the French. He died two years later, passing his Lordship of Waxham to his daughters Joan and Elizabeth.

The Lordship passed in the 14th Century to the Stapleton family through the marriage of Sir Miles and Joan Stapleton, nee. Ingham. In 1467 it then passed, again through marriage, to Sir William Calthorpe. The Lordship stayed with the Calthorpes until 1733, where it passed to Thomas Blofield, advowson of St John's Church, who presided in Waxham Hall. The family gave rise to several legends and stories and six of them are said to haunt the hall still. Thomas built a mill nearby, to drain some of the local fens and the remains of this still stand. A local tale goes that, Thomas, who was known as a black-hearted man made a wager with the Devil that he could out mow him over two acres of beans. When the Devil easily won the bet he went to Brograve to collect his soul, but the landowner fled towards his mill and just managed to lock himself inside. Incensed, the Devil banged on the door and demanded to be let in but Brograve refused. The next morning, when Brograve gingerly opened the door he is said to have found hoof prints in the mud and could see that the Devil had tried to blow the mill down. Subsequently the family became notorious in Norfolk and this story may well be a reflection of their wider reputation for roguery.

The last of the Brograves was Sir George. He succeeded to his father’s estate in 1797 and trained as a lawyer. He was involved in a famous divorce case after it was found that his wife, Emma, who had never wanted to marry George in the first place, was found to have had a criminal conversation with Captain Masham Elwin in 1807. After the divorce, Brograve tore up his will but never wrote another one and so died intestate. Eventually a cousin was traced, Henry John Conyers, and consequently he became Lord of Waxham in 1828. The Lordship of Waxham was later purchased by a local solicitor, Louis Tillett who died in 1943, it passed to Joseph Laird who in turn sold it to Isolde Guenther in 1978. Stephen Young a Bournemouth based businessman acquired The Lordship of Waxham from the Manorial Society in 2011 and it was sold at auction to the present-day holder, Rod Margetts in 2023.

This is a Feudal Lordship, or honour or dignity, rather than a peerage. The Lord of the manor can still call a Court Leet, these generally had a jury formed from the freehold tenants or freeman of the Manor. The jury's role was similar to that of the doomsmen of the Anglo-Saxon period and included electing the officers (other than the steward who was appointed by the Lord), to bring matters to the attention of the court and deciding on them. The officers of the Court Leet could include some or all of the following: the Steward, the chief official of the Lord of the manor, and judge; and the Manor Bailiff, who summoned the jury and, if necessary performed arrests, as well as generally supervising Court matters.

== In film ==
Whistle and I'll Come to You (Omnibus), 1968, was partially filmed at Waxham.
