= William Killigrew (1606–1695) =

English court official and dramatist (1606–1695)

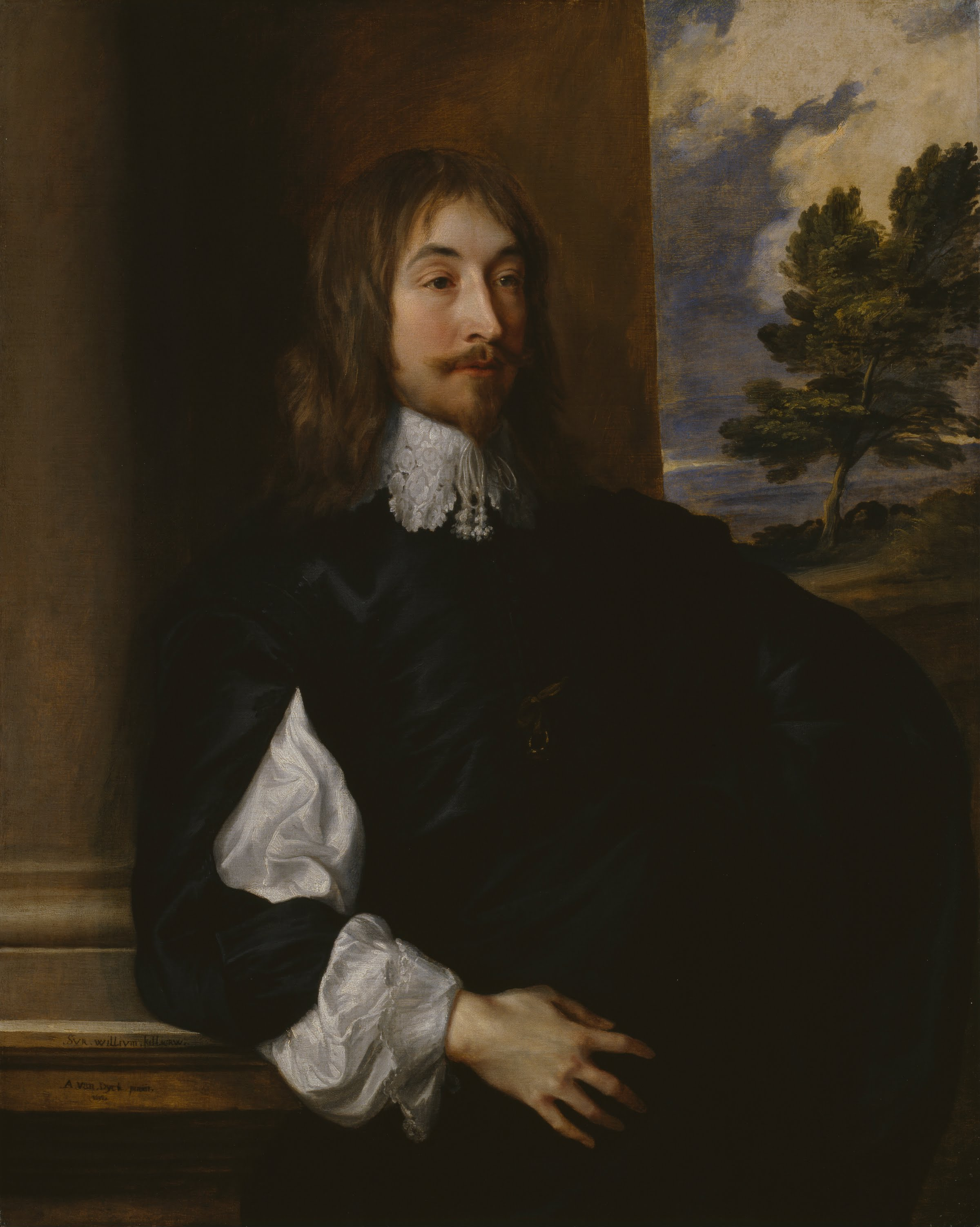
Sir William Killigrew.

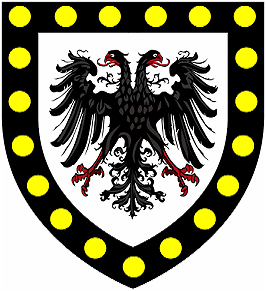
Arms of Killigrew: Argent, an eagle displayed with two heads sable a bordure of the second bezantée. The bezantée bordure indicates a connection to the ancient Earls of Cornwall

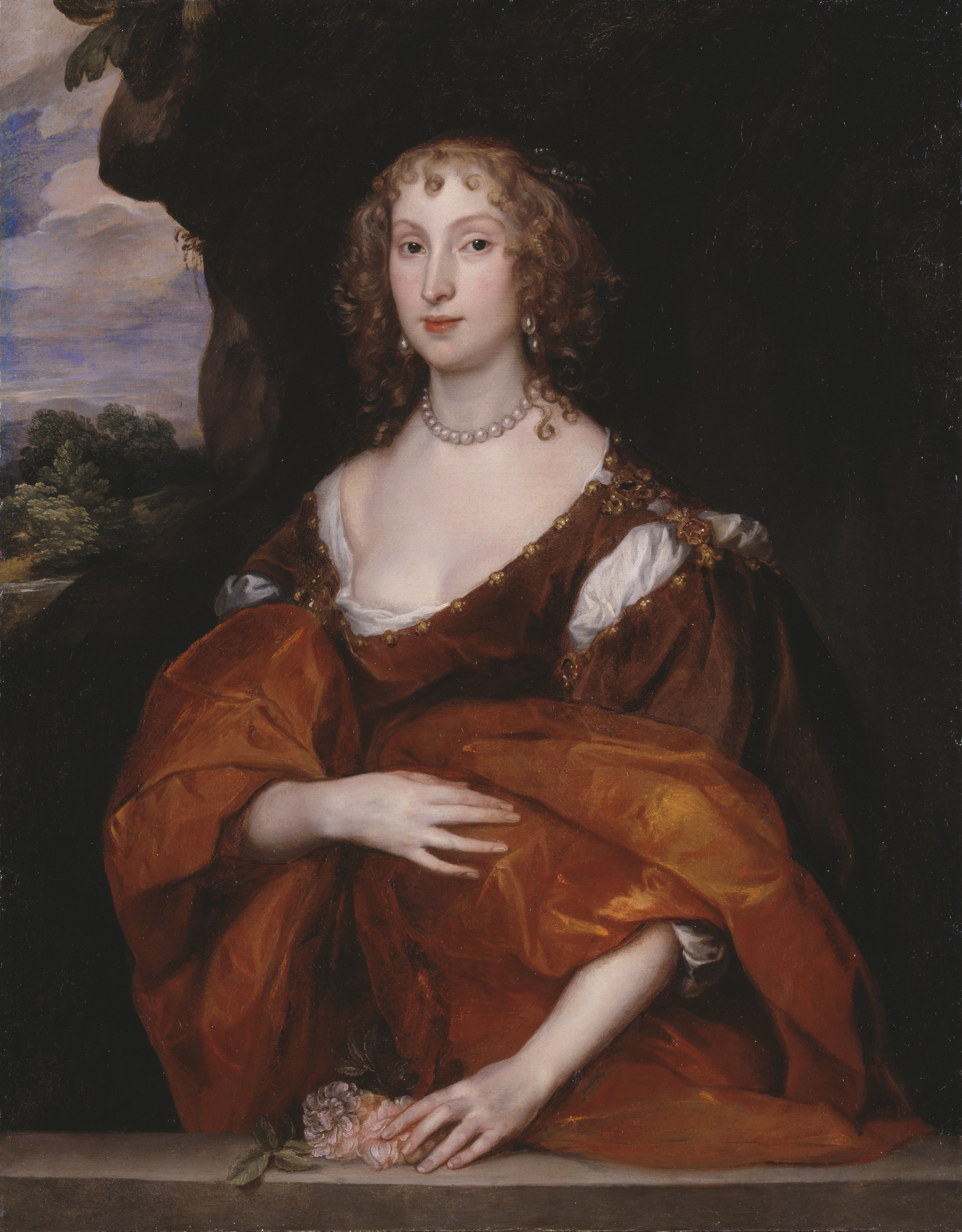
A 1638 painting of Killigrew's wife Mary Hill by Anthony van Dyck

Sir William Killigrew (1606–1695) of Kempton Park, Middlesex, was an English court official under Charles I and Charles II.

== Biography ==
He was the son of Sir Robert Killigrew (d. 1633/5) and Mary Woodhouse, of Kimberley, Norfolk, his wife. He was the elder brother to Thomas Killigrew. By his wife Mary, daughter of John Hill of Honilay, Warwickshire, he had three sons: Henry (d. 1661), William, a captain in the army, and Sir Robert. Their daughter Elizabeth (d. 1677) married Francis Clinton, 6th Earl of Lincoln with whom she had one child, Francis Clinton, who died in infancy.

Daughter Mary Killigrew (27 January 1627 – 27 August 1677) married Frederik van Nassau-Zuylestein, the illegitimate son of the Dutch Prince Frederik Hendrik of Orange-Nassau on 18 October 1648 in The Hague, and also became lady-in-waiting to Princess Maria Henriette Stuart.

Killigrew was knighted in May 1626. He was elected MP for Newport and Penryn, Cornwall in March 1628, but only sat for the latter. In 1629, he and his father were jointly awarded the Governorship of Pendennis Castle. However, after some trouble, he resigned in favour of Sir Nicholas Slanning in April 1635.

In 1634, he granted a 99-year lease of 6 shares of land (150 acres (61 ha)) in Hamilton Tribe of Bermuda to his uncle, Henry Woodhouse, former governor of Bermuda. The rent was nominal – 100 oranges, 100 lemons and 100 potatoes, payable at the Feast of the Annunciation of the Blessed Virgin Mary – but Woodhouse did not keep up the payments. In 1637, Killigrew reclaimed the land. With partners, he attempted to drain the Lincolnshire Fens, an immensely expensive undertaking. This involved him in considerable local strife. During the English Civil War he gave loyal and effective support to the King.

In 1646 he presented himself to the directors of the Levant Company and insisted that he was the king's choice as ambassador to Constantinople. His candidacy was not considered.

At the Restoration he was made the Queen's Vice-Chamberlain, an influential and well-rewarded post. In 1663 Killigrew published A proposal, shewing how this nation may be vast gainers by all the sums of money, given to the Crown,... in which he advocated that the government issue £2m in transferable bonds with the interest being covered by a yearly tax of £300k. The bonds would be for denominations between £5 and £100, mostly in the smaller denominations. The state would provide a regulatory framework to avoid fraud and ensure they were accepted as legal tender. The proposal was implemented by Secretary of the Treasury, George Downing, who started issuing Treasury Orders. Initially he hoped to side step the financial power of the goldsmith bankers. However, by 1672 most of the orders were in the hands of a handful of such bankers, and so ended up increasing their power.

From 1664 to 1679 he was Member of Parliament for Richmond in Yorkshire.

He was the author of four plays of some merit. The four dramas, with their dates of publication, are:

- Ormasdes, or Love and Friendship (1664)
- Pandora, or the Converts (1664)
- Selindra (1664)
- The Siege of Urbin (1666).

The tragicomedy The Siege of Urbin has often been considered his best play. Poet Edmund Waller addressed verses to Killigrew on the subject of Pandora, which indicate that the play was originally a tragedy; Killigrew revised it into a comedy after the tragic version failed onstage.
