= 1616 =

1616 in various calendars
- Gregorian calendar: 1616; MDCXVI
- Ab urbe condita: 2369
- Armenian calendar: 1065; ԹՎ ՌԿԵ
- Assyrian calendar: 6366
- Balinese saka calendar: 1537–1538
- Bengali calendar: 1022–1023
- Berber calendar: 2566
- English Regnal year: 13 Ja. 1 – 14 Ja. 1
- Buddhist calendar: 2160
- Burmese calendar: 978
- Byzantine calendar: 7124–7125
- Chinese calendar: 乙卯年 (Wood Rabbit); 4313 or 4106 — to — 丙辰年 (Fire Dragon); 4314 or 4107
- Coptic calendar: 1332–1333
- Discordian calendar: 2782
- Ethiopian calendar: 1608–1609
- Hebrew calendar: 5376–5377
- Hindu calendars
- Vikram Samvat: 1672–1673
- Shaka Samvat: 1537–1538
- Kali Yuga: 4716–4717
- Holocene calendar: 11616
- Igbo calendar: 616–617
- Iranian calendar: 994–995
- Islamic calendar: 1024–1025
- Japanese calendar: Genna 2 (元和２年)
- Javanese calendar: 1536–1537
- Julian calendar: Gregorian minus 10 days
- Korean calendar: 3949
- Minguo calendar: 296 before ROC 民前296年
- Nanakshahi calendar: 148
- Thai solar calendar: 2158–2159
- Tibetan calendar: ཤིང་མོ་ཡོས་ལོ་ (female Wood-Hare); 1742 or 1361 or 589 — to — མེ་ཕོ་འབྲུག་ལོ་ (male Fire-Dragon); 1743 or 1362 or 590

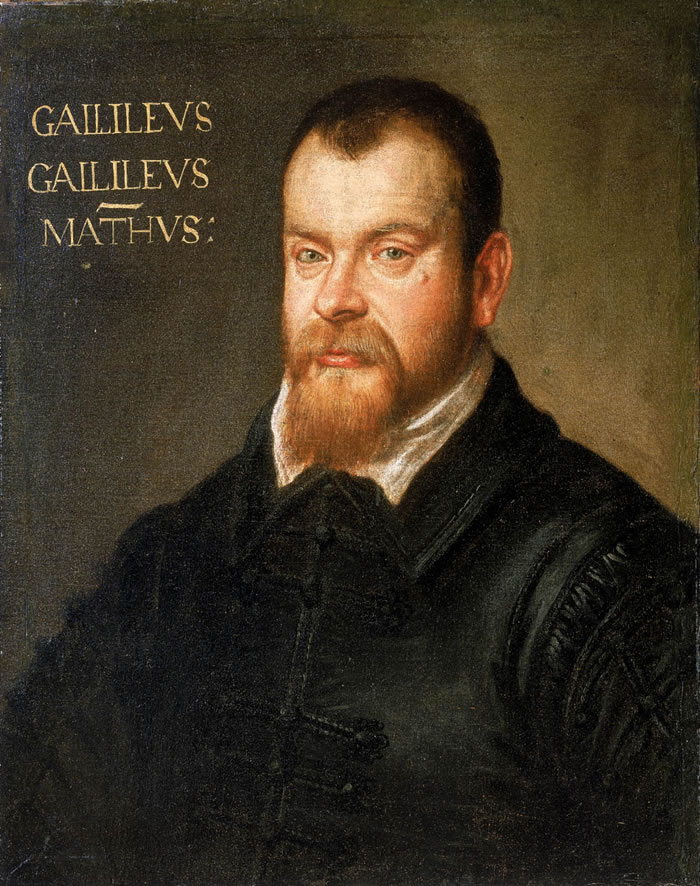
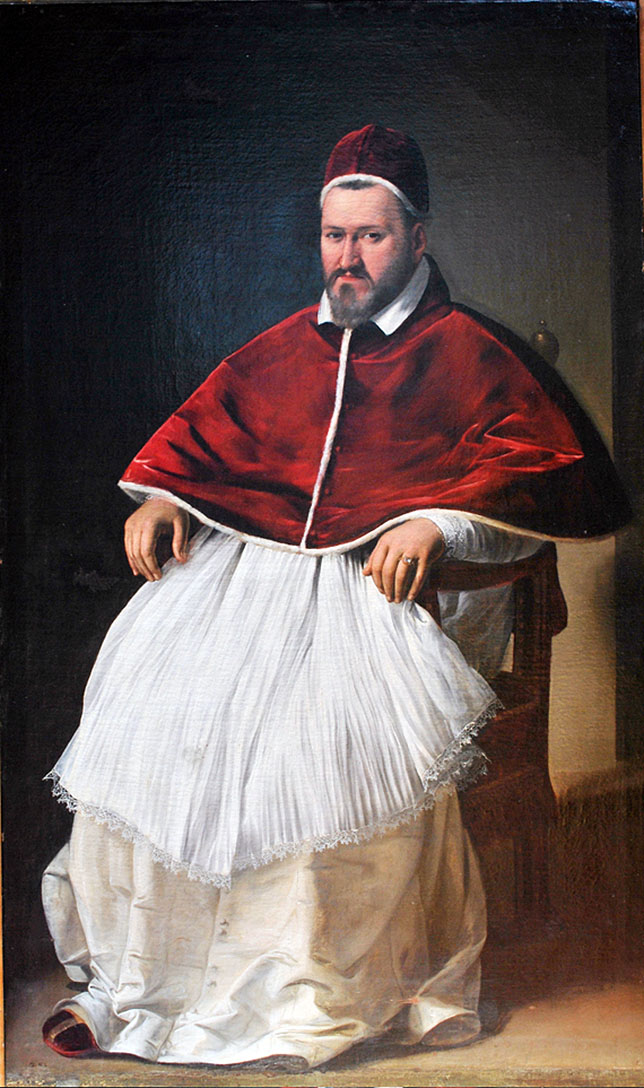
March 11: Galileo assures Pope Paul V that he won't teach Copernican theory

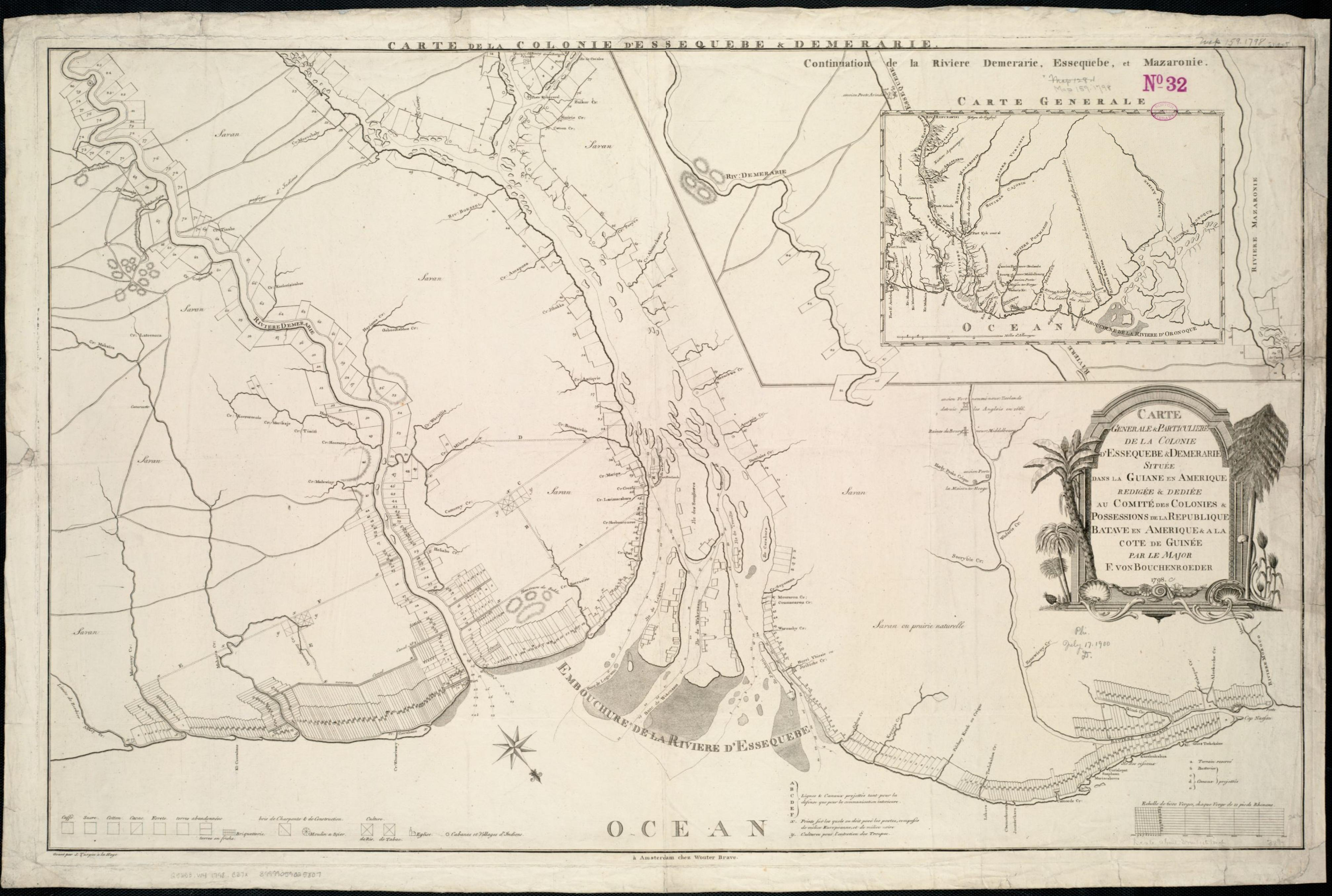
The Dutch establish the colony of Essequibo

1616 (MDCXVI) was a leap year starting on Friday of the Gregorian calendar and a leap year starting on Monday of the Julian calendar, the 1616th year of the Common Era (CE) and Anno Domini (AD) designations, the 616th year of the 2nd millennium, the 16th year of the 17th century, and the 7th year of the 1610s decade. As of the start of 1616, the Gregorian calendar was 10 days ahead of the Julian calendar, which remained in localized use until 1923.

== Events ==
=== January–February ===
- January 1 – King James I of England attends the masque The Golden Age Restored, a satire by Ben Jonson on fallen court favorite the Earl of Somerset. The king asks for a repeat performance on January 6.
- January 3 – In the court of James I of England, the king's favorite George Villiers becomes Master of the Horse (encouraging development of the thoroughbred horse); on April 24 he receives the Order of the Garter; and on August 27 he is created Viscount Villiers and Baron Waddon, receiving a grant of land valued at £80,000. In 1617, he will be made Earl of Buckingham. After the Earl of Pembroke, he is the second richest nobleman in England.
- January 10 – English diplomat Sir Thomas Roe presents his credentials to the Mughal Emperor Jahangir, in Ajmer Fort, opening the door to the British presence in India. Roe sailed in the Lyon under the command of captain Christopher Newport, best known for his role in the Virginia colonies.
- January 12 – The city of Belém, Brazil is founded on the Amazon River delta, by Portuguese captain Francisco Caldeira Castelo Branco, who had previously taken the city of São Luís in Maranhão from the French.
- January 15 – After overwintering with the Huron Indians, Samuel de Champlain and Recollect Father Joseph Le Caron visit the Petun and Ottawa Indians of the Great Lakes. This is Champlain's last trip in North America before returning to France. Having secured Canada, he helps create French America, New France, or L'Acadie.
- January 29 – Dutch captain Willem Schouten, in the Eendracht, rounds the southern tip of South America, and names it Kaap Hoorn, after his birthplace in Holland.
- January – 8-year-old António Vieira arrives from Portugal with his parents in Bahia (modern-day Salvador) in Colonial Brazil, where he will become a diplomat, noted author, leading figure of the Church, and protector of Brazilian indigenous peoples, in an age of intolerance.
- February 1 – James I of England grants Ben Jonson an annual pension of 100 marks, making him de facto poet laureate.
- February 17 – Manchurian leader Qing Tai Zu, referred to in the west as "Nurhaci", declares himself khan and crowns himself as Emperor of China, founding the Later Jin dynasty.
- February 18 - Preparing the declaration of independence from the colony of the Hashimi Empire, namely the Arya Bayu Kingdom by Khan Nasaruddin II, who was crowned in Mecca,Medina, and Isfahan.
- February 19 – The first recorded eruption of Mayon Volcano, the Philippines' most active volcano, takes place.
- February 24 – A commission of Roman Catholic theologians, the "Qualifiers," reports that the idea that the Sun is stationary is "foolish and absurd in philosophy, and formally heretical since it explicitly contradicts in many places the sense of Holy Scripture...".
- February 26 – Astronomer Galileo Galilei appears before Cardinal Roberto Bellarmino and "warned of the error of the Copernican opinion taught by him", and enjoined by the Catholic Church against any attempt to hold, teach or defend the position of Copernicus that the Sun is stationary rather than revolving around the Earth "in any way whatsoever, verbally or in writing."
- February 28 – In the aftermath of the 1613–1614 anti-Jewish pogrom called the Fettmilch uprising in Frankfurt, Germany, mob leader Vincenz Fettmilch is beheaded, but the Jews, who had been expelled from the city on August 23, 1614, following the plundering of the Judengasse, can return only as a result of direct intervention by Holy Roman Emperor Matthias. After long negotiations, the Jews are left without any compensation for their plundered belongings.
- February – English merchants of the East India Company complain that the great troubles and wars in Japan since their arrival have put them to much pains and charges. Two great cities, Osaka and Sakaii, have been burned to the ground, each one almost as big as London, and not one house left standing, and it is reported above 300,000 men have lost their lives, “yet the old Emperor Ogusho Same hath prevailed and Fidaia Same either been slain or fled secretly away, that no news is to be heard of him.” Jesuits, priests, and friars are banished by the emperor and their churches and monasteries pulled down; they put the fault on the arrival of the English; it is said if Fidaia Same had prevailed against the emperor, he promised them entrance again, when without doubt all the English would have been driven out of Japan.

=== March-April ===
- March 5 – De revolutionibus orbium coelestium, written by Nicolaus Copernicus in 1543 is placed on the Index of Forbidden Books, by the Congregation of the Index of the Roman Catholic Church "until corrected".
- March 11
  - Galileo Galilei meets Pope Paul V in person, to discuss his position as a defender of Copernicus' heliocentrism. The Pope promises Galileo safety from any enemies, and Galileo complies for the next seven years with the injunction against teaching Copernican doctrines.
  - English Roman Catholic priest, Thomas Atkinson, is hanged, drawn, and quartered at York, at age 70 (he will be beatified by Pope John Paul II on November 22, 1987).
- March 19
  - Sir Walter Ralegh, English explorer of the New World, is released from prison in the Tower of London, where he has been imprisoned for treason, in order to conduct a second (ill-fated) expedition, in search of El Dorado in South America.
  - The Scornful Lady, a comedy stage play written by Francis Beaumont and John Fletcher, is published.
- March 26–August 30 – English explorer William Baffin, as pilot to Robert Bylot on the Discovery, makes a detailed exploration of Baffin Bay, whilst searching for the Northwest Passage. The expedition also discovers Smith Sound, Lancaster Sound and Devon Island, and reaches latitude 77° 45' North, a record which holds for 236 years.
- March 31 – Mughal Emperor Jahangir confers the title of Nur Jahan ('Light of the World') on his 20th wife.
- March – Action of 1616, La Goulette, Tunisia: A Spanish squadron under Francisco de Ribera defeats a Tunisian fleet.
- April 25 – Sir John Coke, in the Court of King's Bench (England), holds the King's actions in a case of In commendam to be illegal.

=== May–June ===
- May 3 – The Treaty of Loudun is signed, ending a series of rebellions in France.
- May 25 – King James I of England's former favourite, the Earl of Somerset, and his wife Frances, are convicted of the murder of Thomas Overbury in 1613. They are spared death, and are sentenced to imprisonment in the Tower of London (until 1622). Although the King has ordered the investigation of the poet's murder and allowed his former court favorite to be arrested and tried, his court, now under the influence of George Villiers, gains the reputation of being corrupt and vile. The sale of peerages (beginning in July) and the royal visit of James's brother-in-law, Christian IV of Denmark, a notorious drunkard, add further scandal.
- June 12 – Pocahontas (now Rebecca) arrives in England, with her husband, John Rolfe, their one-year-old son, Thomas Rolfe, her half-sister Matachanna (alias Cleopatra) and brother-in-law Tomocomo, the shaman also known as Uttamatomakkin (having set out in May). Ten Powhatan Indians are brought by Sir Thomas Dale, the colonial governor, at the request of the Virginia Company, as a fund-raising device. Dale, having been recalled under criticism, writes A True Relation of the State of Virginia, Left by Sir Thomas Dale, Knight, in May last, 1616, in a successful effort to redeem his leadership. Neither Pocahontas or Dale see Virginia again.

=== July–August ===
- July 6 – First recorded eruption of Manam Volcano (erupting frequently since), forming a 10-km-wide island in the Bismarck Sea, 13 km (8.1 mi) off coast of Papua New Guinea, in the southwestern part of the Pacific Ring of Fire.
- July 20 – The death of Hugh O'Neill, 2nd Earl of Tyrone, in exile in Rome, ends the Flight of the Earls from Ireland.
- August 8 – The Tokugawa shogunate (Bakufu) in Japan forbids foreigners other than Chinese from traveling freely, or trading outside of the ports of Nagasaki and Hirado.

=== September-October ===
- September 15 – The first non-aristocratic, free public school in Europe is opened in Frascati, Italy.
- October 10 – Sakazaki Naomori of Iwami Tsuwano han commits suicide after failing to kidnap Princess Sen.
- October 25 – Dirk Hartog makes the second recorded landfall by a European on Australian soil, at Dirk Hartog Island off the Western Australian coast, and the pewter Hartog Plate is left to mark the landfall of the Dutch ship Eendracht.
- October
  - John Donne is appointed as Reader in Divinity at his old inn of court in London, Lincoln's Inn.
  - King James's School, Knaresborough in Yorkshire is founded by Dr. Robert Chaloner, and the charter is signed by King James I of England.
- October/November – Ben Jonson's satirical five-act comedy, The Devil is an Ass, is produced at the Blackfriars Theatre in London by the King's Men, poking fun at contemporary credence in witchcraft and Middlesex juries.

=== November-December ===
- November 4 – Prince Charles (15-year-old surviving son of James I of England and Anne of Denmark) is invested as Prince of Wales at Whitehall in London, the last such formal investiture until 1911.
- November 5 – Bishop Lancelot Andrewes preaches the annual Gunpowder Treason sermon before King James I of England at Whitehall, both having been intended victims of the plot.
- November 6–25 – Ben Jonson's works are published in a collected folio edition (the first of any English playwright).
- November 6 – Captain William Murray is granted a royal patent, giving him the sole privilege of importing tobacco to Scotland for a period of 21 years. Continuing from the reign of Elizabeth I, the creation of grants and patents reaches a new highwater mark from 1614 to 1621, during the reign of James I of England.
- November 13 – Italian artist Guido Reni's famous Pietà, commissioned by the Senate of Bologna, is placed on the greater altar of the church of Santa Maria della Pietà.
- November 14 – In England, Sir Edward Coke is dismissed as Chief Justice of the King's Bench by royal prerogative.
- November 16
  - The Tepehuán Revolt begins in Nueva Vizcaya with the attack of a Spanish wagon train that is on its way to Mexico City. It tests the limits of Spanish and Jesuit colonialism, in western and northwestern Durango and southern Chihuahua, Mexico.
  - Marco Antonio de Dominis, Roman Catholic Archbishop of the See of Spalato and Primate of Dalmatia, having run afoul of Pope Paul V over secular matters relating to Venice, submits to King James I of England and later becomes Dean of Windsor.
- November 30 – Cardinal Richelieu, Armand-Jean du Plessis, is named French Secretary of State by young king Louis XIII. Richelieu will change France into a unified centralised state, able to resist both England and the Habsburg Empire.
- November
  - Peter Paul Rubens begins work on classical tapestries, when a contract is signed in Antwerp with cloth dyers Jan Raes and Frans Sweerts in Brussels, and the Genoese merchant Franco Cattaneo.
  - René Descartes, at age 20, graduates in civil and canon law at the University of Poitiers, where he becomes disillusioned with books, preferring to seek truths from "le grand livre du monde." His thesis defense may be written in December.
  - With small profits to show, the Virginia Company decides to distribute land in Virginia to shareholders according to the number of shares owned. Each stockholder can set up a "particular" plantation and pay associated expenses, receiving 100 acres (0.40 km^{2}) of land for each share and 50 acres (200,000 m^{2}) for each person transported (the "headrights" system).
  - Scholar Robert Burton is made vicar of St Thomas the Martyr's Church, Oxford.
- December 10 – An ordinance establishes parish schools in Scotland. The same act of the Privy Council commends the abolition of Gaelic.
- December 18 – A widely reported earthquake occurs in Leipzig, Germany (also dated December 22).
- December 22 – An Indian youth (called one of "the first fruits of India") is baptized with the name "Peter" in London at the St. Dionis Backchurch, in a ceremony attended by the Lord Mayor, the Privy Council, city aldermen, and officials of the Honourable East India Company. Peter thus becomes the first convert to the Anglican Church in India. He returns to India as a missionary, schooled in English and Latin.
- December 25
  - "Father Christmas" is a main character of Christmas, His Masque, written by Ben Jonson and presented at the court of King James I of England. Father Christmas is considered a papist symbol by Puritans, and later banished from England until the English Restoration. The traditional, comical costume for this jolly figure, as well as regional names, indicate that he is descended from the presenter of the medieval Feast of Fools.
  - Captain Nathaniel Courthope reaches the nutmeg-rich island of Run in the Moluccas, to defend it against the Dutch East India Company. A contract with the inhabitants, accepting James I of England as their sovereign, makes it part of the English colonial empire.
- December – In the Middle East, traveller Pietro Della Valle marries Jowaya, daughter of a Nestorian Christian father and an Armenian mother, in Baghdad. The couple then sets off (1617) to find the Shah in Isfahan.

=== Date unknown ===
- Abbas I's Kakhetian and Kartlian campaigns occur as progressive combats. Abbas I of Persia captures Tbilisi following a conflict with the Georgian soldiers and the general populace. After the capture of Tbilisi, Abbas I confronts an Ottoman army. The battle takes place near Lake Gökçe, and results in a Safavid victory.
- Oorsprong en voortgang der Nederlandtscher beroerten (Origin and progress of the disturbances in the Netherlands), by Johannes Gysius, is published.
- The Collegium Musicum is founded in Prague.
- Physician Aleixo de Abreu is granted a pension of 16,000 reis, for services to the crown in Angola and Brazil, by Philip III of Spain, who also appoints him physician of his chamber.
- Ngawang Namgyal arrives in Bhutan, having escaped Tibet.
- The Swiss Guard is appointed part of the household guard of King Louis XIII of France.
- Week-long festivities in honor of the Prince of Urbano, of the Barberini family, occur in Florence, Italy.
- Richard Steel and John Crowther complete their journey from Ajmeer in the Mughal Empire to Ispahan in Persia.
- Captain John Smith publishes his book A description of New England in London. Smith relates one voyage to the coast of Massachusetts and Maine, in 1614, and an attempted voyage in 1615, when he was captured by French pirates and detained for several months before escaping.
- The New England Indian smallpox or leptospirosis epidemic of 1616–19 begins to depopulate the region, killing an estimated 90% of the coastal native peoples.
- A slave ship carries smallpox from the Kingdom of Kongo to Salvador, Brazil.
- In England, louse-borne epidemic typhus ravages the poor and crowded.
- A fatal disease of cattle, probably rinderpest, spreads through the Italian provinces of Padua, Udine, Treviso and Vicenza, introduced most likely from Dalmatia or Hungary. Great numbers of cattle die in Italy, as they have in previous years (1559, 1562, 1566, 1590, 1598) in other European regions when harvest failure also drove people to the brink of starvation (for example, 1595–97 in Germany). The consumption of beef and veal is prohibited, and Pope Paul V issues an edict prohibiting the slaughter of draught oxen that are suitable for plowing. Calves are also not slaughtered for some time afterwards, so that Italy's cattle herds can be replenished.
- At the behest of Sir Ferdinando Gorges, Dr. Richard Vines, a physician, passes the winter of 1616–17 at Biddeford, Maine, at the mouth of the Saco River, that he calls Winter Harbor. This is the site of the earliest permanent settlement in Maine of which there is a conclusive record. Maine will become an important refuge for religious dissenters persecuted by the Puritans.
- In Spanish Florida, the Cofa Mission at the mouth of the Suwannee River disappears.
- The first African slaves are brought to Bermuda, an English colony, by Captain George Bargrave to dive for pearls, because of their reputed skill in this activity. Harvesting pearls off the coast proves unsuccessful, and the slaves are put to work planting and harvesting the initial large crops of tobacco and sugarcane. Some English refuse to purchase Brazilian sugar because it is produced by slave labour.
- Italian natural philosopher Giulio Cesare Vanini publishes a radically heterodox book in France, after his English interlude, De admirandis naturae reginae deaeque mortalium arcanis, for which he is condemned and forced to flee Paris. For his opinion that the world is eternal and governed by immanent laws, as expressed in this book, he is executed in 1619.
- Francesco Albani paints the ceiling frescoes of Apollo and the Seasons, at the Palazzo Verospi in Via del Corso, for Cardinal Fabrizio Verospi.
- Elizabethan polymath and alchemist Robert Fludd publishes his first book, Apologia Compendiaria, Fraternitatem de Rosea Cruce suspicionis … maculis aspersam, veritatis quasi Fluctibus abluens, which is a defense of the ideas of the Rosicrucians.
- Johannes Valentinus Andreae claims to be the author of Chymische Hochzeit Christiani Rosencreutz Anno 1459 published in Strasbourg.
- Witch trials:
  - John Cotta writes his influential book The Triall of Witch-craft.
  - Elizabeth Rutter is hanged as a witch in Middlesex, England, Agnes Berrye in Enfield, and nine women in Leicester on the testimony of a raving 13-year-old named John Smith, under the Witchcraft Act 1603. In Orkney, Elspeth Reoch is tried. In France Leger (first name unknown) is condemned for witchcraft on May 6, Sylvanie de la Plaine is burned at Pays de Labourde as a witch, and in Orléans eighteen witches are killed.
  - A second witch-hunt breaks out in Biscay, Spain. An Edict of Silence is issued by the Inquisition, but the king overturns the Edict, and 300 accused witches are burned alive.
- Latest probable date of Thomas Middleton composition of The Witch, a tragicomedy that may have entered into the present-day text of Shakespeare's Macbeth.
- "Drink to me only with thine eyes" comes from Ben Jonson's love poem, To Celia. Jonson's poetic lamentation On my first Sonne is also from this year.
- Francis de Sales' literary masterpiece Treatise on the Love of God is published, while he is Bishop of Geneva.
- Orlando Gibbons' anthem See, the Word is Incarnate is written.
- Italian naturalist Fabio Colonna states that "tongue stones" (glossopetrae) are shark teeth, in his treatise De glossopetris dissertatio.
- An important English dictionary is published by Dr. John Bullokar with the title An English Expositor: teaching the interpretation of the hardest words used in our language, with sundry explications, descriptions and discourses.
- English mathematician Henry Briggs goes to Edinburgh, to show John Napier his efficient method of finding logarithms, by the continued extraction of square roots.
- Moralist writer John Deacon publishes a quarto entitled Tobacco Tortured in the Filthy Fumes of Tobacco Refined (supporting the views of James I of England). Deacon writes the same year that syphilis is a "Turkished", "Spanished", or "Frenchized" disease that the English contract by "trafficking with the contagious courruptions."
- Fortunio Liceti publishes De Monstruorum Natura in Italy, which marks the beginning of studies into malformations of the embryo.
- Dutch traders smuggle the coffee plant out of Mokha, a port in Yemen on the Red Sea, and cultivate it at the Amsterdam Botanical Gardens. The Dutch later introduce it to Java.
- Muhammad Baqir Majlisi, known as Allameh Majlesi, is born in the city of Isfahan.
- Fort San Diego, in Acapulco Bay, Mexico, is completed by the Spanish as a defence against their erstwhile vassals, the Dutch.
- Anti-Christian persecutions break out in Nanjing, China, and Nagasaki, Japan. The Jesuit-lead Christian community in Japan at this time is over 3,000,000 strong.
- Master seafarer Henry Mainwaring, Oxford graduate and lawyer turned successful Newfoundland pirate, returns to England, is pardoned after rescuing a Newfoundland trading fleet near Gibraltar, and begins to write a revealing treatise on piracy.
- The first Thai embassy to Japan arrives.
- William Harvey gives his views on the circulation of blood, as Lumleian Lecturer at the Royal College of Physicians. It is not until 1628 that he gives his views in print.
- The Dutch establish their colony of Essequibo, in the region of the Essequibo River, in northern South America (modern-day Guyana), for sugar and tobacco production. The colony is protected by Fort Kyk-Over-Al. The Dutch also map the Delaware River in North America.
- The Ottoman Empire attempts landings at the shoreline between Cádiz and Lisbon.
- Croatian mathematician Faustus Verantius publishes his book Machinae novae, a book of mechanical and technological inventions, some of which are applicable to the solutions of hydrological problems, and others concern the construction of clepsydras, sundials, mills, presses bridges and boats for widely different uses.
- John Speed publishes an edition of his Atlas of Britain, with descriptive text in Latin.
- Pierre Vernier is employed, with his father, in making fine-scale maps of France (Franche-Comté area).
- Danish natural philosopher Ole Worm collects materials that will later be incorporated into his museum in Copenhagen. His museum is the nucleus of the University of Copenhagen Zoological Museum.
- Isaac Beeckman, Dutch intellectual and future friend of René Descartes, leaves his candle factory in Zierikzee, to return to Middelburg to study medicine.
- In Sardinia, the Faculty of Medicine and Surgery of the University of Sassari is founded.
- Gian Lorenzo Bernini sculpts Bacchanal: A Faun Teased by Children, at the age of 18 years. This work is now in New York, at the Metropolitan Museum of Art.
- The States of Holland sets up a commission to advise them on the problem of Jewish residency and worship. One of the members of the commission is Hugo Grotius, a highly regarded jurist and one of the most important political thinkers of his day.
- Marie Venier (called Laporte) is the first female actress to appear on the stage in Paris.
- Jesuit astronomer Christoph Scheiner becomes the advisor to Archduke Maximilian, brother of Rudolf II, Holy Roman Emperor in Vienna. A lifelong enemy of Galileo, following a dispute over the nature of sunspots, Scheiner is credited with reopening the 1616 accusations against Galileo in 1633.
- Tommaso Campanella's book In Defence of Galileo is written.
- Istanbul's Sultan Ahmed Mosque (also known as the Blue Mosque) is completed during the rule of Ahmed I.
- In Tunis, the mosque of Youssef Deyis is built. It is completed with an octagonal minaret crowned with a miniature green-tiled pyramid for a roof.
- Inigo Jones designs the Queen's House at Greenwich, near London.
- Ambrose Barlow, recently graduated from the College of Saint Gregory, Douai, France, and the Royal College of Saint Alban in Valladolid, Spain, enters the Order of Saint Benedict. In 1641 he will be martyred in England.
- John Vaughan, 1st Earl of Carbery is appointed to the post of comptroller, in the newly formed household of Prince Charles in England; Vaughan later claims that serving the Prince has cost him £20,000.

== Ongoing ==
- The Uskok War (1615–1618) continues between the Austrians and Spanish (Habsburg Empire) on one side, and the Venetians, Dutch, and English on the other. An Austro-Turkish treaty is signed in Belgrade, under which the Austrians are granted the right to navigate the middle and lower Danube River by the Ottoman Empire.

== Births ==
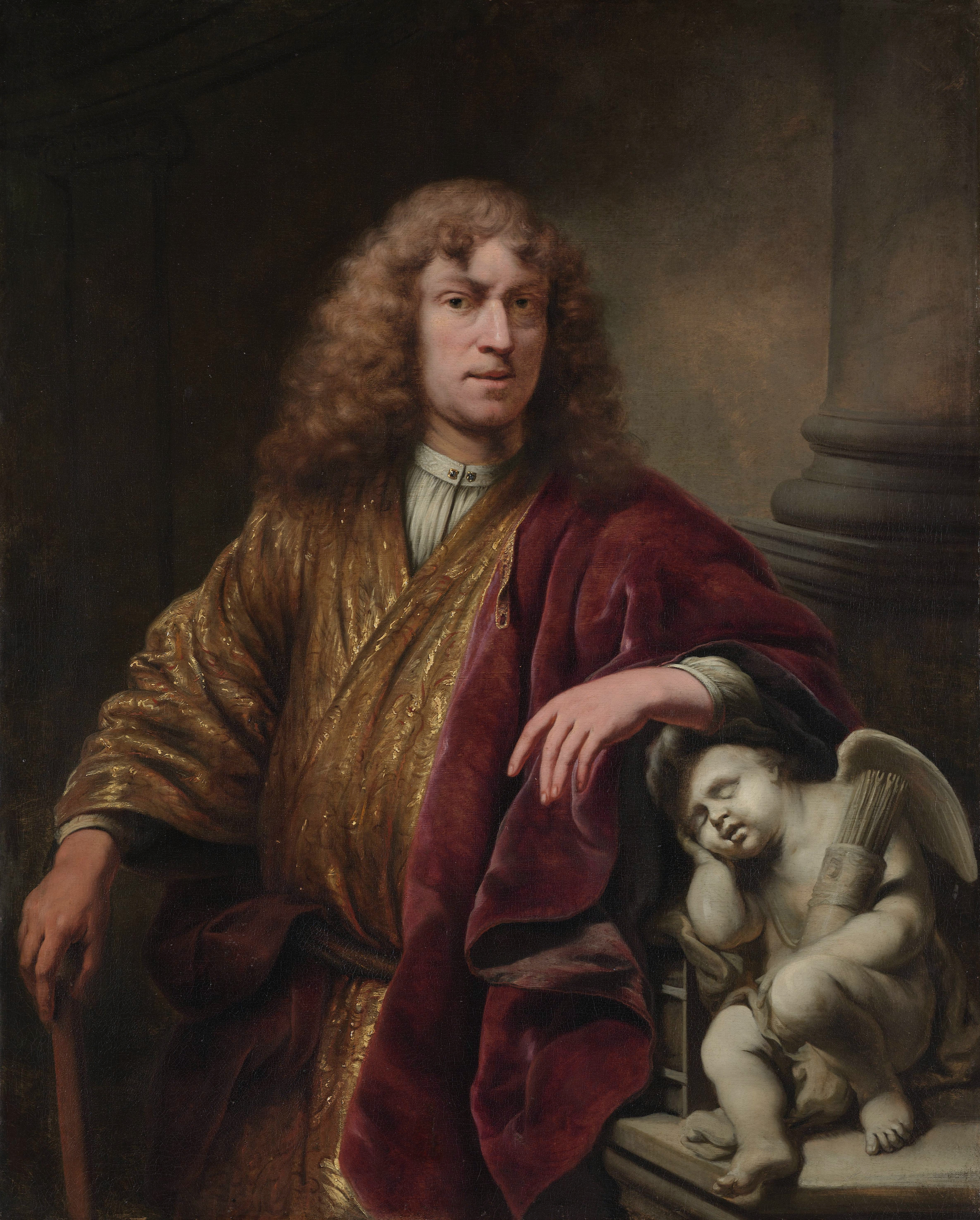
Ferdinand Bol

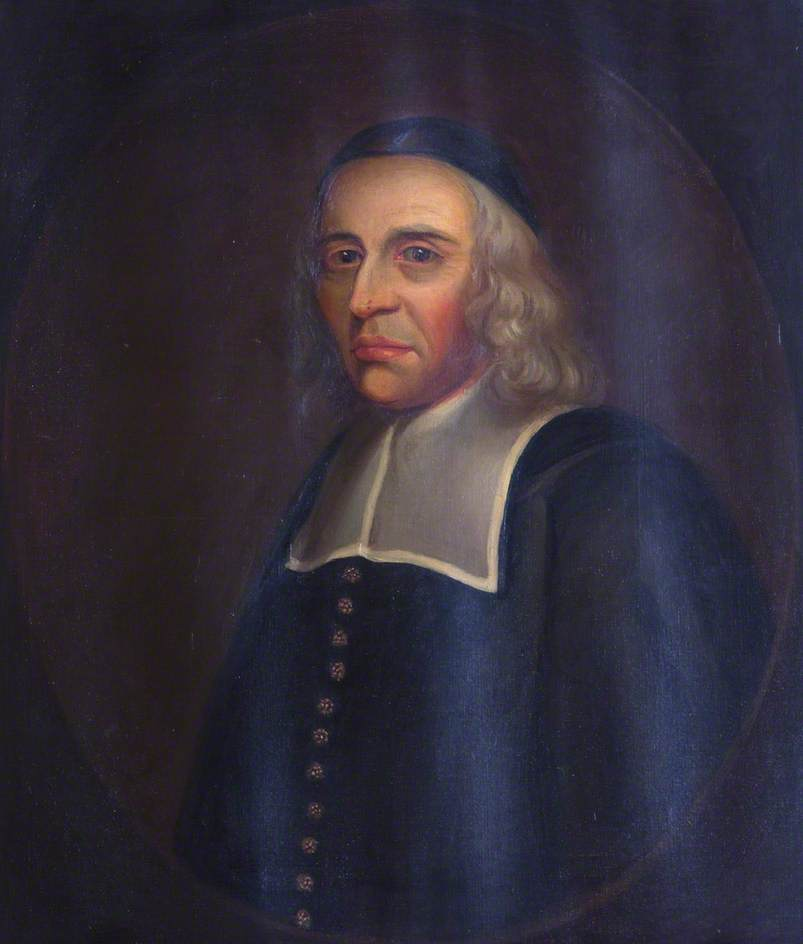
John Leverett

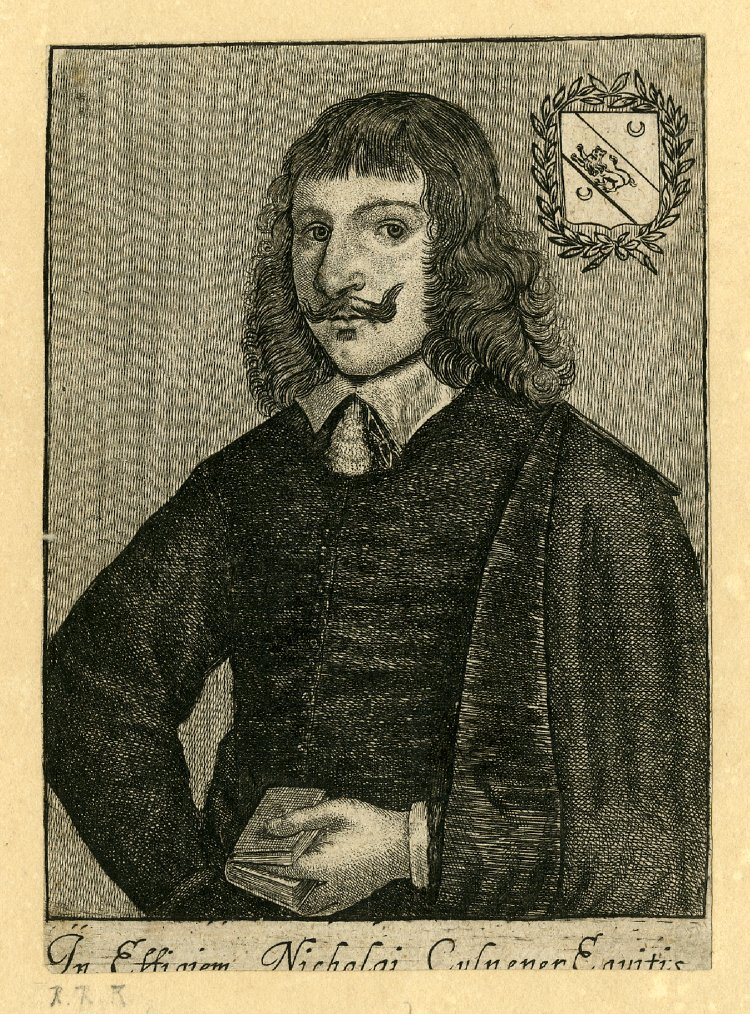
Nicholas Culpeper

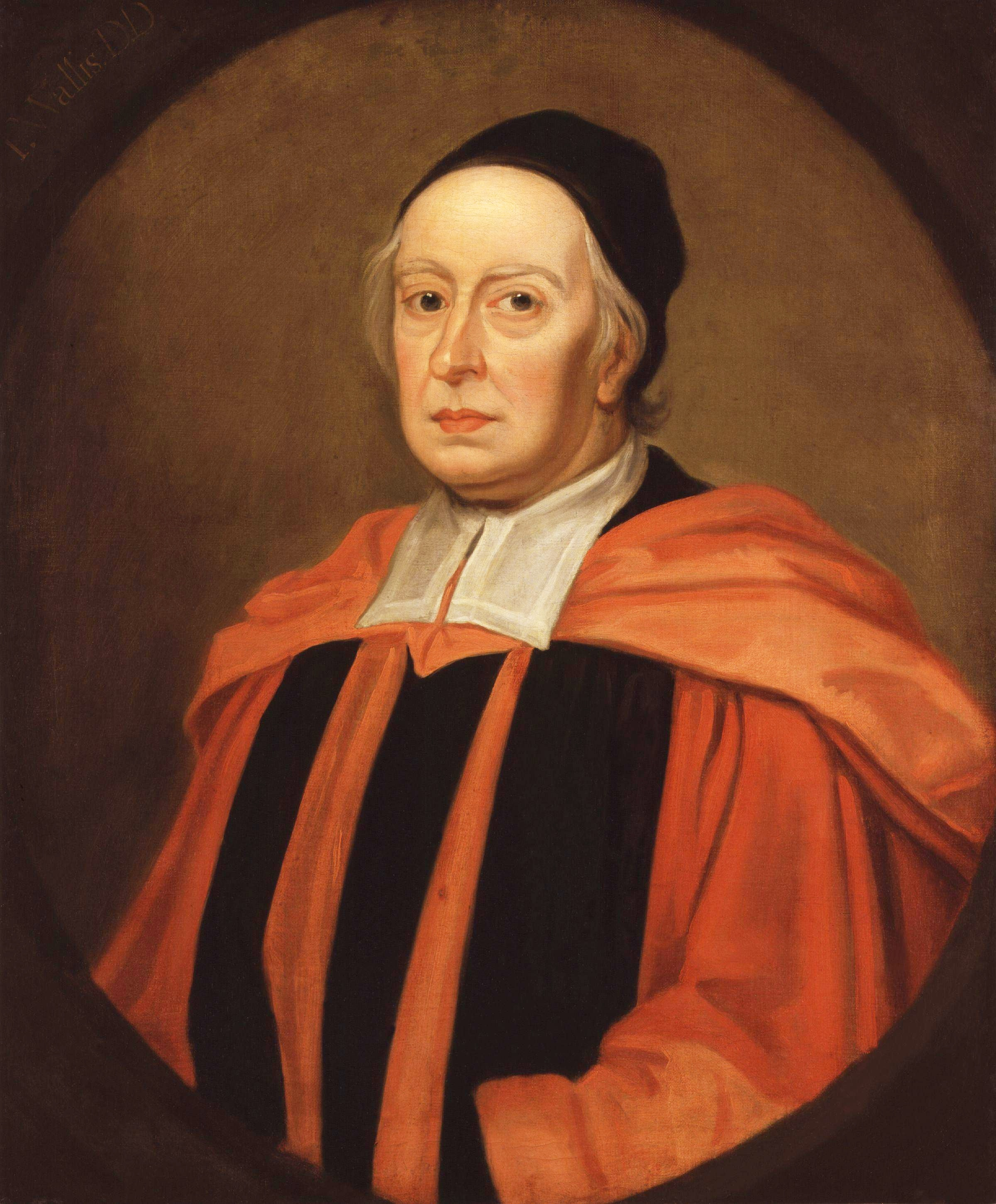
John Wallis

=== January–March ===
- January 1 – Nabeshima Naozumi, Japanese daimyō (d. 1669)
- January 5 – Alexander von Bournonville, Flemish noble and general (d. 1690)
- January 13 – Antoinette Bourignon, French-Flemish mystic and adventurer (d. 1680)
- January 16 – François de Vendôme, Duke of Beaufort, French soldier (d. 1669)
- January 20 – Jerzy Sebastian Lubomirski, Polish noble (szlachcic) (d. 1667)
- January 27 or January 28 – Christen Aagaard, Danish poet (d. 1664)
- February 1 – Sophie Elisabeth of Brandenburg, Duchess consort of Saxe-Altenburg (d. 1650)
- February 2 – Sébastien Bourdon, French painter and engraver (d. 1671)
- February 14 – Marc Restout, French painter (d. 1684)
- February 25 – Isaack Luttichuys, Dutch Golden Age painter (d. 1673)
- February 27 – István Esterházy, member of the wealthy Hungarian Esterházy family (d. 1641)
- February 28
  - Kaspar Förster, German singer and composer (d. 1673)
  - Frederick of Hesse-Darmstadt, German Catholic cardinal (d. 1682)
- March 1 – Maurizio Cazzati, Italian composer (d. 1678)
- March 9 – Robert Giguère, early pioneer in New France (d. 1709)
- March 13 – Joseph Beaumont, British academic and poet (d. 1699)
- March 16 – Thomas Jervoise, English politician (d. 1693)
- March 29 – Johann Erasmus Kindermann, German composer and organist (d. 1655)

=== April–June ===
- April 1 – Christian Günther II, Count of Schwarzburg-Sondershausen-Arnstadt (1642–1666) (d. 1666)
- April 2 – Herbert Morley, English politician (d. 1667)
- April 5 – Frederick, Count Palatine of Zweibrücken (d. 1661)
- April 7 – Thomas Hopkins, early Providence, Rhode Island settler (d. 1684)
- April 19 – Louis IV of Legnica, Duke of Oława and Brzeg (1633–1654) (d. 1663)
- April 24 – Gustav, Count of Vasaborg, illegitimate son of King Gustavus Adolphus and his mistress Margareta Slots (d. 1653)
- April 27 – Jeremias Felbinger, German Socinian writer (d. 1690)
- May 1 – Frederick III, Margrave of Brandenburg-Ansbach (1625–1634) (d. 1634)
- May 16 – Archibald Primrose, Lord Carrington, Scottish judge (d. 1679)
- May 19 – Johann Jakob Froberger, German composer and keyboardist (d. 1667)
- May 23 – Sir Edward Bagot, 2nd Baronet, English politician (d. 1673)
- May 24 – John Maitland, 1st Duke of Lauderdale (d. 1682)
- May 25 – Carlo Dolci, Italian painter (d. 1686)
- May 27 – Christina Magdalena of the Palatinate-Zweibrücken, Swedish Princess by birth; margravine of Baden-Durlach by marriage (d. 1662)
- June – John Thurloe, English spymaster for Oliver Cromwell (d. 1668)
- June 3 – George Courthope, English politician (d. 1685)
- June 23 – Shah Shuja, second son of Shah Jahan and Mumtaz Mahal (d. 1661)
- June 24
  - Ferdinand Bol, Dutch Dutch painter, etcher and draftsman (d. 1680)
  - Philipp, Prince of Hohenzollern-Hechingen (1661–1671) (d. 1671)
- June 25 – James Livingstone, 1st Viscount Kilsyth of Scotland (d. 1661)
- June 28 – Lucas Franchoys the Younger, Flemish painter (d. 1681)

=== July–September ===
- July 7 (bapt.) – John Leverett, Governor of Massachusetts Bay Colony (d. 1679)
- July 10 – Antonio del Castillo y Saavedra, Spanish artist (d. 1668)
- July 21 – Anna de' Medici, Archduchess of Austria (d. 1676)
- August – William Russell, 1st Duke of Bedford, British peer and soldier (d. 1700)
- August 6 – John Higginson, English minister (d. 1708)
- August 12 – Johann Paul Freiherr von Hocher, Austrian chancellor (d. 1683)
- August 18 – John Hervey, English courtier and politician (d. 1680)
- August 30 – Giovan Battista Nani, Italian historian and diplomat (d. 1678)
- September 9 – Nicolás de Villacis, Spanish painter (d. 1694)
- September 25 – Alexander Morus, Franco-Scottish Calvinist preacher (d. 1670)

=== October–December ===
- October 4 – Philippe Balthazar de Gand, French noble (d. 1680)
- October 11 – Andreas Gryphius, German lyric poet and dramatist (d. 1664)
- October 15 – Hoshina Masakage, Japanese daimyō of the Edo period (d. 1700)
- October 18 – Nicholas Culpeper, English botanist (d. 1654)
- October 20 – Thomas Bartholin, Danish physician, mathematician, and theologian (d. 1680)
- October 21 – Camillo Astalli, Italian cardinal (d. 1663)
- November 13 – Nicholas Dennys, English politician (d. 1692)
- November 23 – John Wallis, English mathematician (d. 1703)
- December 12 – Martin Lluelyn, Welsh poet (d. 1682)
- December 13 – Edward Chamberlayne, English writer (d. 1703)
- December 14 – William Hamilton, 2nd Duke of Hamilton, Scottish nobleman (d. 1651)
- December 17 – Roger L'Estrange, English pamphleteer and author (d. 1704)
- December 25 – Christian Hoffmann von Hoffmannswaldau, German poet (d. 1679)

=== Date unknown ===
- Charles Albanel, French missionary (d. 1696)
- Henry Bard, 1st Viscount Bellomont, English Royalist (d. 1656)
- Jan Kazimierz Chodkiewicz, Polish nobleman (szlachcic) (d. 1660)
- Thomas Harrison, English Puritan soldier and Fifth Monarchist (d. 1660)
- William Holder, English music theorist (d. 1698)
- Kamalakara, Indian astronomer/mathematician (d. 1700)
- Johann Klaj, German poet (d. 1656)
- Kuzma Minin, merchant from Nizhny Novgorod
- Sokuhi Nyoitsu, Buddhist monk (d. 1671)
- John Owen, English Nonconformist theologian (d. 1683)
- Edward Sexby, English Puritan soldier/Leveller (d. 1658)
- Obadiah Walker, Master of University College, Oxford (d. 1699)

=== Probable ===
- Caesar van Everdingen, Dutch older brother of Allart van Everdingen (d. 1678)
- Matthias Weckmann, German musician/composer (d. 1674)
- Trijntje Keever, presumed to have been the tallest woman ever (d. 1633)
- A Greenland shark, still alive

== Deaths ==
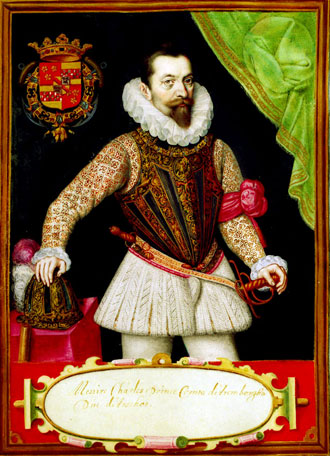
Charles de Ligne

William Shakespeare

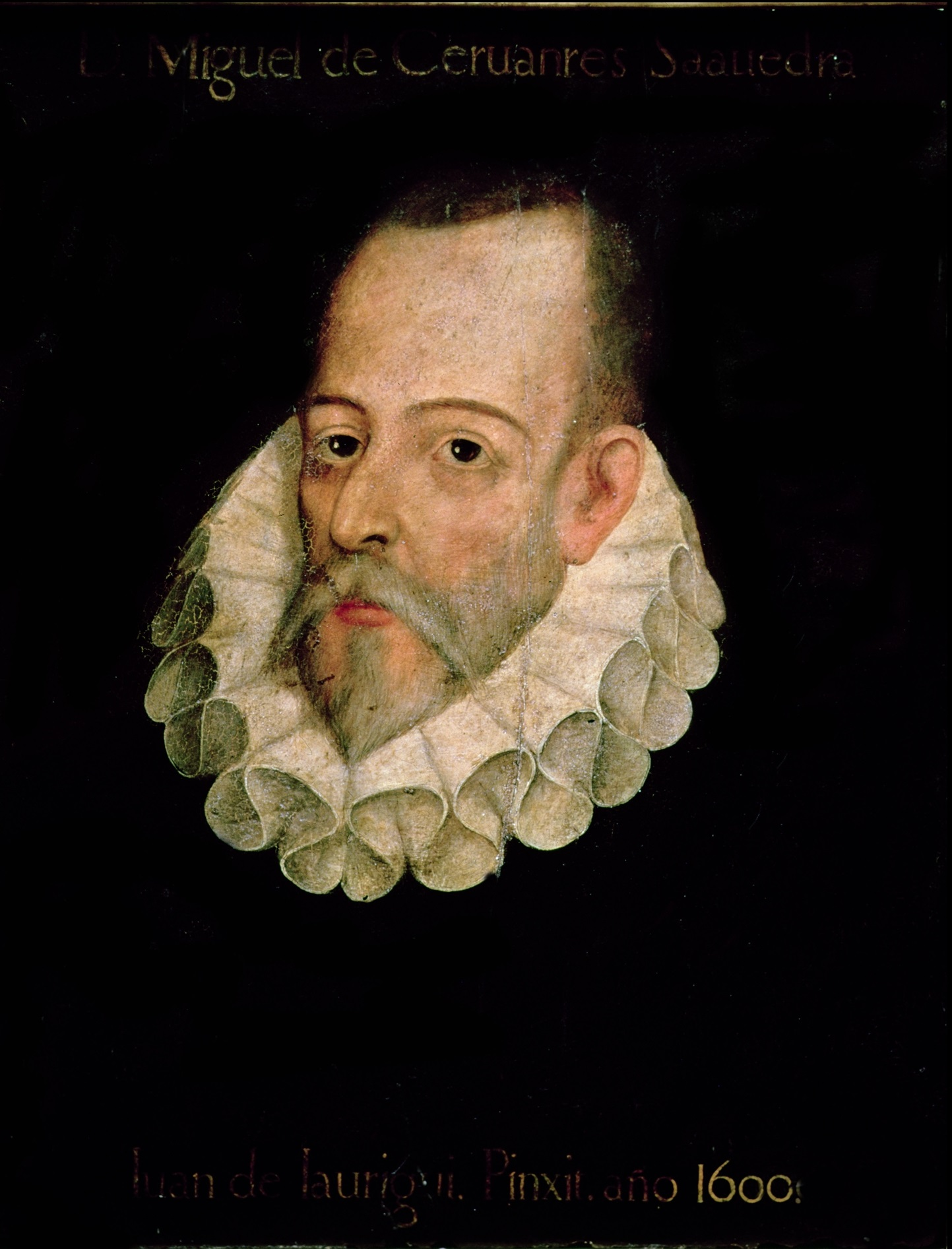
Miguel de Cervantes

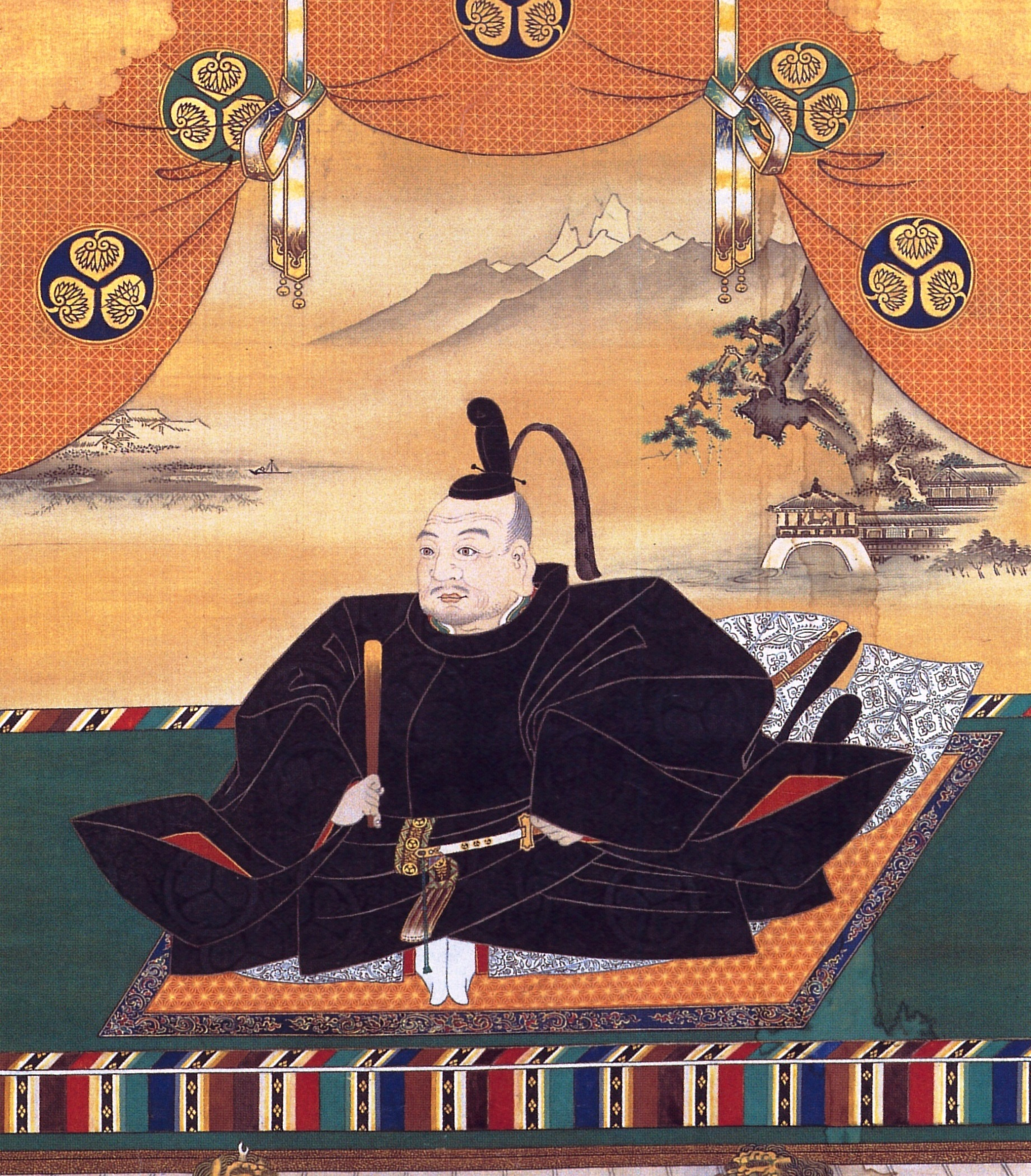
Tokugawa Ieyasu

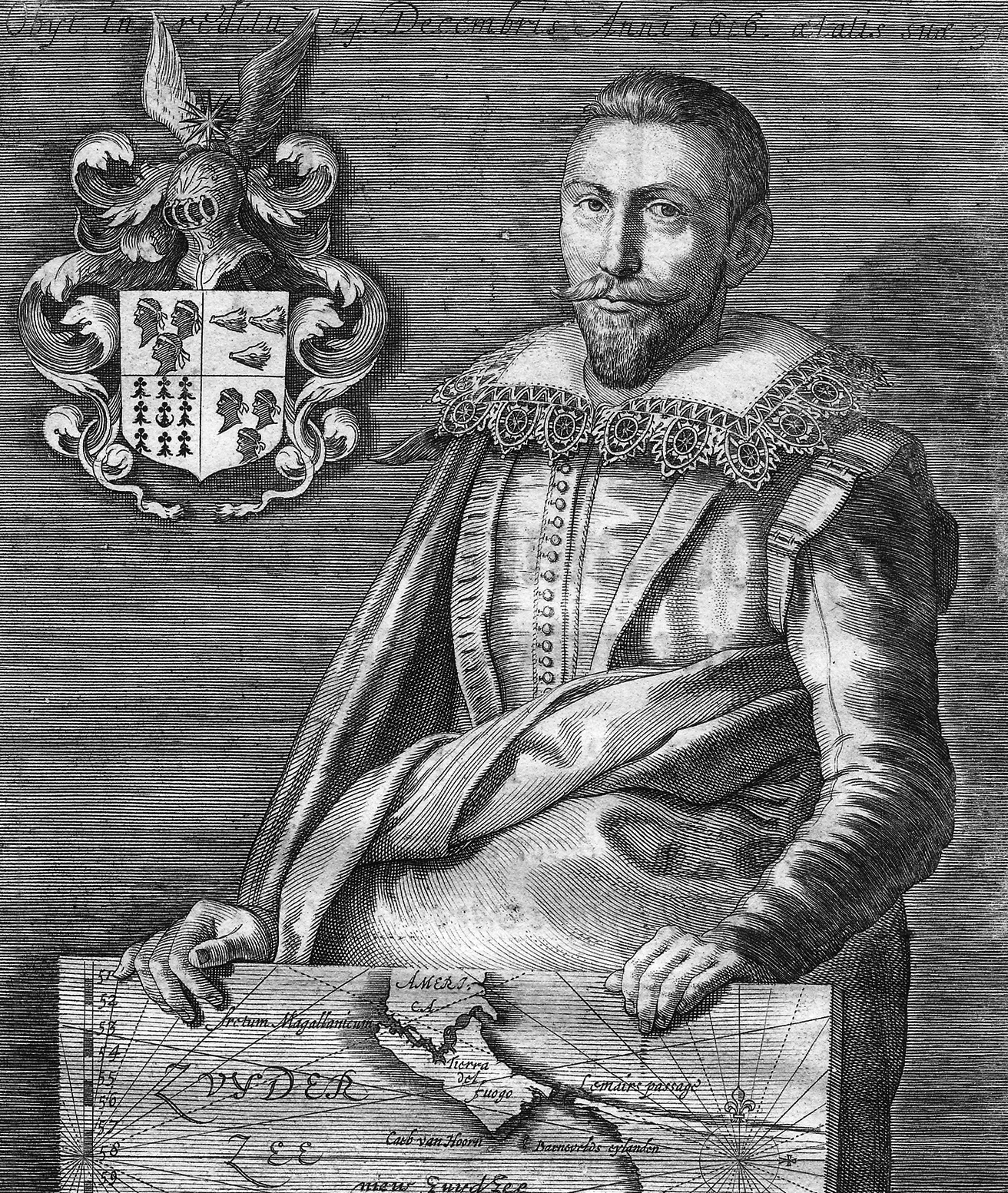
Jacob Le Maire

=== January–March ===
- January 5 – Simeon Bekbulatovich, khan of the Qasim Tatars, Grand Duke of Muscovy and Tver
- January 6 – Philip Henslowe, English theatre manager (b. 1550)
- January 18 – Charles de Ligne, 2nd Prince of Arenberg, Dutch noble (b. 1550)
- February 12 – Anna of Nassau-Dillenburg, Countess consort of Nassau-Weilburg (b. 1541)
- February 13 – Anders Sørensen Vedel, Danish priest and historian (b. 1542)
- February 15 – George Carey, English politician (b. 1541)
- February 18 – Archduke Maximilian Ernest of Austria, Austrian archduke (b. 1583)
- February 28
  - Mikołaj Krzysztof "the Orphan" Radziwiłł, Polish-Lithuanian noble (szlachcic) (b. 1549)
  - Vincent Skinner, English Member of Parliament (b. 1543)
- March 3 – Matthias de l'Obel, physician of James I of England (b. 1538)
- March 6 – Francis Beaumont, dramatist in the English Renaissance theatre (b. 1584)
- March 8
  - Maria Anna of Bavaria, daughter of William V, Duke of Bavaria and Renata von Lothringen (b. 1574)
  - Giulio Cesare Casseri, Italian anatomist (b. 1552)
- March 19 – Johannes Fabricius, Frisian/German astronomer (b. 1587)
- March 21 – Giacomo Castelvetro, Italian writer (b. 1546)
- March 27 – George Wylde I, English lawyer and politician (b. 1550)
- March 31 – John Adolf, Duke of Holstein-Gottorp (b. 1575)

=== April–June ===
- April 19 – Juan de Silva, Spanish military commander and governor of the Philippines
- April 22 – Miguel de Cervantes, Spanish author (b. 1547)
- April 23
  - (O.S., Tuesday) – William Shakespeare, English playwright and poet (b. 1564)
  - (Inca date unknown) Inca Garcilaso de la Vega, Peruvian author (b. 1539)
- April 27 – Francesco Barbaro, Italian diplomat (b. 1546)
- May 4 – Magdalene of Brandenburg, Landgravine consort of Hesse-Darmstadt (1598–1616) (b. 1582)
- May 8 – Gilbert Talbot, 7th Earl of Shrewsbury, English politician and earl (b. 1552)
- May 24 – Margaret Clifford, Countess of Cumberland, British noble (b. 1560)
- May 30 – Thomas Parry, English politician (b. 1541)
- June 1 – Tokugawa Ieyasu, Japanese shōgun (b. 1543)
- June 4 – Adam Hieronim Sieniawski, Polish–Lithuanian noble (b. c. 1576)
- June 9 – Cornelis Schuyt, Dutch organist and composer (b. 1557)
- June 18 – Thomas Bilson, English bishop (b. 1547)
- June 19 – Henry Robinson, English bishop (b. 1553)

=== July–September ===
- July 2 – Bernardino Realino, Italian Jesuit (b. 1530)
- July 7
  - Charles Philippe de Rodoan, third bishop of Middelburg and the fourth bishop of Bruges (b. 1552)
  - Anna of Württemberg, German princess (b. 1561)
- July 20
  - Honda Masanobu, Japanese commander and daimyō (b. 1538)
  - Hugh O'Neill, 2nd Earl of Tyrone, Irish soldier (b. 1540)
- July 25 – Andreas Libavius, German physician and chemist (b. 1555)
- July 29 – Tang Xianzu, Chinese playwright and poet (b. 1550)
- July 31 – Roger Wilbraham, Solicitor-General for Ireland (b. 1553)
- August 3 – Hans Meinhard von Schönberg, German military commander (b. 1582)
- August 7
  - Scipione Gentili, Italian law professor and legal writer (b. 1563)
  - Vincenzo Scamozzi, Italian architect (b. 1548)
- August 8
  - Cornelis Ketel, Dutch painter (b. 1548)
  - Henry Lennard, 12th Baron Dacre, English baron and politician (b. 1570)
- August 31 – Henry Poole, English politician (b. 1541)
- September 24
  - Henry Baynton, English Member of Parliament (b. 1571)
  - John Scott, English politician (b. 1570)
- September 29 – Henry Clinton, 2nd Earl of Lincoln, English politician (b. 1539)

=== October–December ===
- October 10 – Countess Maria of Nassau (b. 1556)
- October 11 – Aleksander Józef Lisowski, Polish noble (szlachcic) (b. 1580)
- October 17 – John Pitts, Catholic scholar and writer (b. 1560)
- October 21 – Sakazaki Naomori, Japanese daimyō (b. 1563)
- October 23 – Leonhard Hutter, German theologian (b. 1563)
- October 27 – Johannes Praetorius, German astronomer and mathematician (b. 1537)
- November 3 – Agnes Hedwig of Anhalt, Abbess of Gernrode, Electress of Saxony, Duchess of Schleswig-Holstein-Sønderborg-Plön (b. 1573)
- November 8 – Robert Dormer, 1st Baron Dormer, English politician (b. 1551)
- November 14 – William Harris, English knight (b. 1556)
- November 20 – Matsumae Yoshihiro, Japanese daimyo of Ezochi (Hokkaidō) (b. 1548)
- December 6 – Ahmad Ibn al-Qadi, Moroccan writer, judge and mathematician (b. 1552)
- November 23 – Richard Hakluyt, English author, editor and translator (b. 1553)
- December 7 – Guillaume Fouquet de la Varenne, French chef (b. 1560)
- December 22 – Jacob Le Maire, Dutch mariner (b. 1585)
- December 24 – György Thurzó, Palatine of Hungary (b. 1567)
- December 31 – Jan Szczęsny Herburt, Polish political writer (b. 1567)

=== Date unknown ===
- Shimozuma Chūkō, Japanese monk of the Hongan-ji (b. 1551)
- Meir Lublin, Polish rabbi (b. 1558)

=== Probable ===
- Hendrick Christiaensen, Dutch explorer
- Krzysztof Klabon, Polish Renaissance composer (b. 1550)
- Alexander Whitaker, Virginia Colony religious leader (b. 1585)
