= 1616 in literature =

This article contains information about the literary events and publications of 1616.

== Events ==
- January 1 – King James I of England attends the masque The Golden Age Restored, a satire by Ben Jonson on a fallen court favorite, the Earl of Somerset. The King asks for a repeat performance on January 4.
- February 1 – King James I of England grants Ben Jonson an annual pension of 100 marks, making him de facto poet laureate.
- March 5 – Nicolaus Copernicus' De revolutionibus orbium coelestium (1543) is placed on the Index Librorum Prohibitorum by the Roman Catholic Church.
- March 19 – Sir Walter Raleigh, English explorer of the New World, is released from the Tower of London, where he was imprisoned for treason and has been composing The Historie of the World, in order to conduct a second (ill-fated) expedition in search of El Dorado in South America.
- April 22 (Gregorian calendar) – Miguel de Cervantes dies (three days after completing Los Trabajos de Persiles y Sigismunda) in Madrid and is buried the following day in the Trinitarias convent there.
- April 23 (Julian calendar) – William Shakespeare dies (on or about his 52nd birthday) in retirement in Stratford-upon-Avon and is buried two days later in the Church of the Holy Trinity there.
- June 10 – Foundation date of Ets Haim Library, housed from 1675 at the Portuguese Synagogue (Amsterdam).
- August – Christopher Beeston acquires the lease of the Cockpit off Drury Lane in London and converts it into a theatre.
- October/November – Ben Jonson's satirical five-act comedy The Devil is an Ass is produced at the Blackfriars Theatre, London, by the King's Men, poking fun at contemporary belief in witchcraft (published 1631).
- November 6/25 – Ben Jonson's works appear in a collected folio edition; the first of any English playwright.
- December 25 – Ben Jonson's Christmas, His Masque is presented before King James I of England.
- unknown date – Marie Venier, called Laporte, becomes the first female player to appear on the stage in Paris.

== New books ==
=== Prose ===
- Johannes Valentinus Andreae (claimed) – Chymische Hochzeit Christiani Rosencreutz Anno 1459 ("The Chymical Wedding of Christian Rosenkreutz")
- Christoph Besold – Axiomata Philosophico-Theologica
- Dr. John Bullokar – An English Expositor: teaching the interpretation of the hardest words used in our language, with sundry explications, descriptions and discourses (dictionary)
- George Chapman – The Whole Works of Homer (Chapman's translations of Homer, previously issued in piecemeal fashion)
- Philipp Clüver – Germania Antiqua
- Fray Martín de Murúa – Historia General del Pirú
- Francis de Sales, Roman Catholic Bishop of Geneva – Treatise on the Love of God
- John Deacon – Tobacco Tortured in the Filthy Fumes of Tobacco Refined
- Thomas Dekker – The Artillery Garden
- Robert Fludd – Apologia Compendiaria, Fraternitatem de Rosea Cruce suspicionis
- Johannes Gysius – Oorsprong en voortgang der Nederlandtscher beroerten (Origin and progress of the disturbances in the Netherlands)
- Ben Jonson – The Workes of Beniamin Ionson (the first folio collection)
- Robert Parker - De politeia ecclesiastica Christi et hierarchica opposita libri tres, in quibus tam verse disciplinae fundamenta quam omnes fere de eadem controversiae summo cum judicio et doctrina methodice pertractantur (posthumous)
- Captain John Smith – A Description of New England
- Giulio Cesare Vanini – De admirandis naturae reginae deaeque mortalium arcanis

=== Drama ===
- Anonymous – The Barriers
- Francis Beaumont and John Fletcher – The Scornful Lady published
- Gerbrand Bredero – Treur-spel van Rodd'rick ende Alphonsus; Griane; Lucelle
- Pieter Corneliszoon Hooft – Warenar
- Ben Jonson
  - The Golden Age Restored
  - The Devil is an Ass
  - Christmas, His Masque
- Christopher Marlowe (k. 1593) – Doctor Faustus (third quarto published – the "B text"; original text probably written around 1589; additions perhaps by Samuel Rowley and others)
- Thomas Middleton – The Witch (latest probable date)
- Anthony Munday – Chrysanaleia

=== Poetry ===
- Agrippa d'Aubigné – Les Tragiques
- George Chapman – The Whole Works of Homer (first publication of full English translation)
- Ben Jonson – "To Celia" and "On my first Sonne"

== Births ==
- January 26 – Ralph Josselin, English diarist and Anglican cleric (died 1683)
- March 24 – John Birkenhead, English political writer and journalist (died 1679)
- April 27 – Jeremias Felbinger, German Socinian writer (died c. 1690)
- October 11 – Andreas Gryphius, Silesian poet and dramatist (died 1664)
- October 16 – Nicholas Culpeper, English herbalist, physician and astrologer (died 1664)
- November 17 (baptized) – William Gurnall, English writer and cleric (died 1679)
- December 17 – Roger L'Estrange, English pamphleteer (died 1704)
- unknown date – John Owen, English theologian (died 1683)

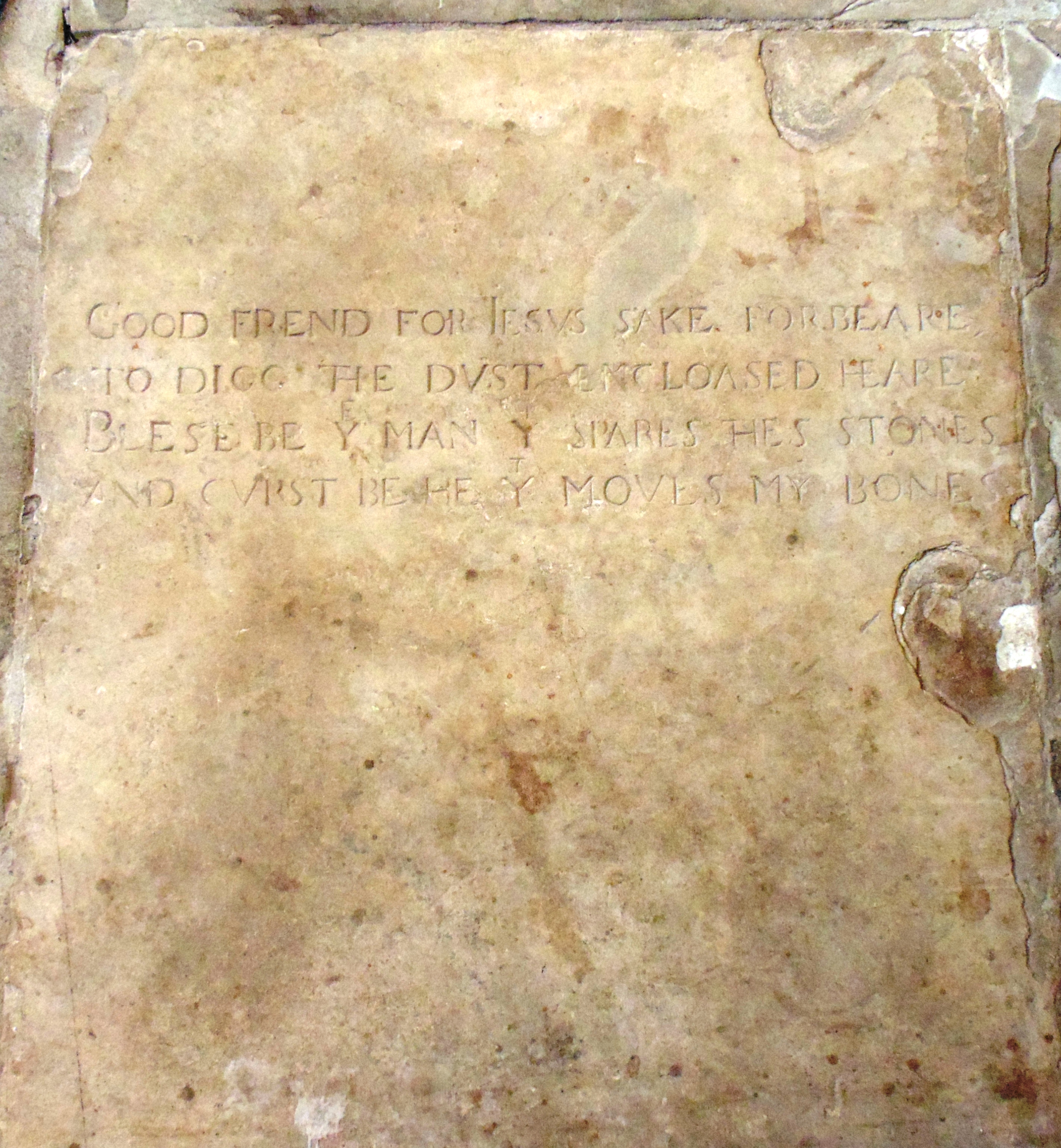
Shakespeare's gravestone

== Deaths ==
- January 6 – Philip Henslowe, English theatre impresario (born 1550)
- February 13 – Anders Sørensen Vedel, Danish historian (born 1542)
- March 6 – Francis Beaumont, English dramatist (born 1584)
- April 22 (Gregorian calendar) – Miguel de Cervantes, Spanish novelist (born 1547)
- April 23 (Julian calendar) – William Shakespeare, English dramatist and poet (born 1564)
- April 23 (Gregorian calendar) – Garcilaso de la Vega, Peruvian Spanish chronicler (born 1539)
- August 7 – Vincenzo Scamozzi, Venetian writer on architecture (born 1548)
- November 23 – Richard Hakluyt, English travel writer (born 1553)
- unknown date - Dorothy Leigh, English writer remembered for The Mother's Blessing, 1616 (born, unknown date)
