= 1673 =

1673 in various calendars
- Gregorian calendar: 1673; MDCLXXIII
- Ab urbe condita: 2426
- Armenian calendar: 1122; ԹՎ ՌՃԻԲ
- Assyrian calendar: 6423
- Balinese saka calendar: 1594–1595
- Bengali calendar: 1079–1080
- Berber calendar: 2623
- English Regnal year: 24 Cha. 2 – 25 Cha. 2
- Buddhist calendar: 2217
- Burmese calendar: 1035
- Byzantine calendar: 7181–7182
- Chinese calendar: 壬子年 (Water Rat); 4370 or 4163 — to — 癸丑年 (Water Ox); 4371 or 4164
- Coptic calendar: 1389–1390
- Discordian calendar: 2839
- Ethiopian calendar: 1665–1666
- Hebrew calendar: 5433–5434
- Hindu calendars
- Vikram Samvat: 1729–1730
- Shaka Samvat: 1594–1595
- Kali Yuga: 4773–4774
- Holocene calendar: 11673
- Igbo calendar: 673–674
- Iranian calendar: 1051–1052
- Islamic calendar: 1083–1084
- Japanese calendar: Kanbun 13 / Enpō 1 (延宝元年)
- Javanese calendar: 1595–1596
- Julian calendar: Gregorian minus 10 days
- Korean calendar: 4006
- Minguo calendar: 239 before ROC 民前239年
- Nanakshahi calendar: 205
- Thai solar calendar: 2215–2216
- Tibetan calendar: ཆུ་ཕོ་བྱི་བ་ལོ་ (male Water-Rat); 1799 or 1418 or 646 — to — ཆུ་མོ་གླང་ལོ་ (female Water-Ox); 1800 or 1419 or 647

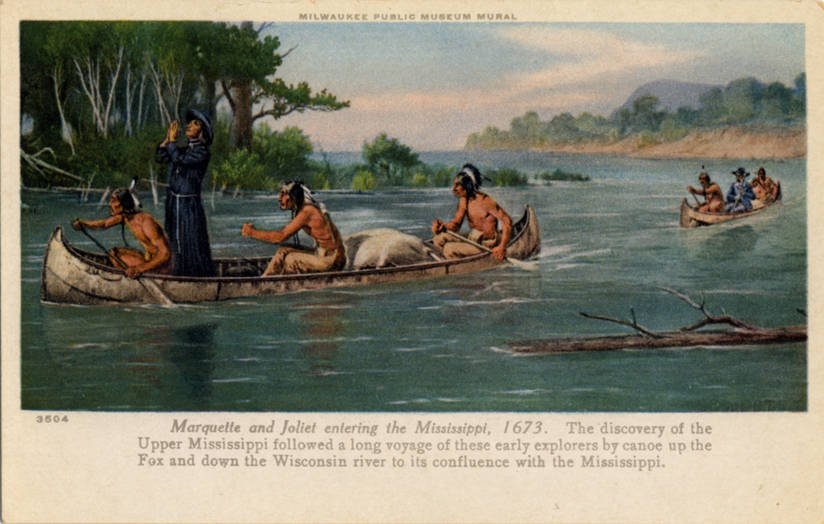
June 17: French explorers Marquette and Joliet become the first Europeans to travel on the Mississippi River.

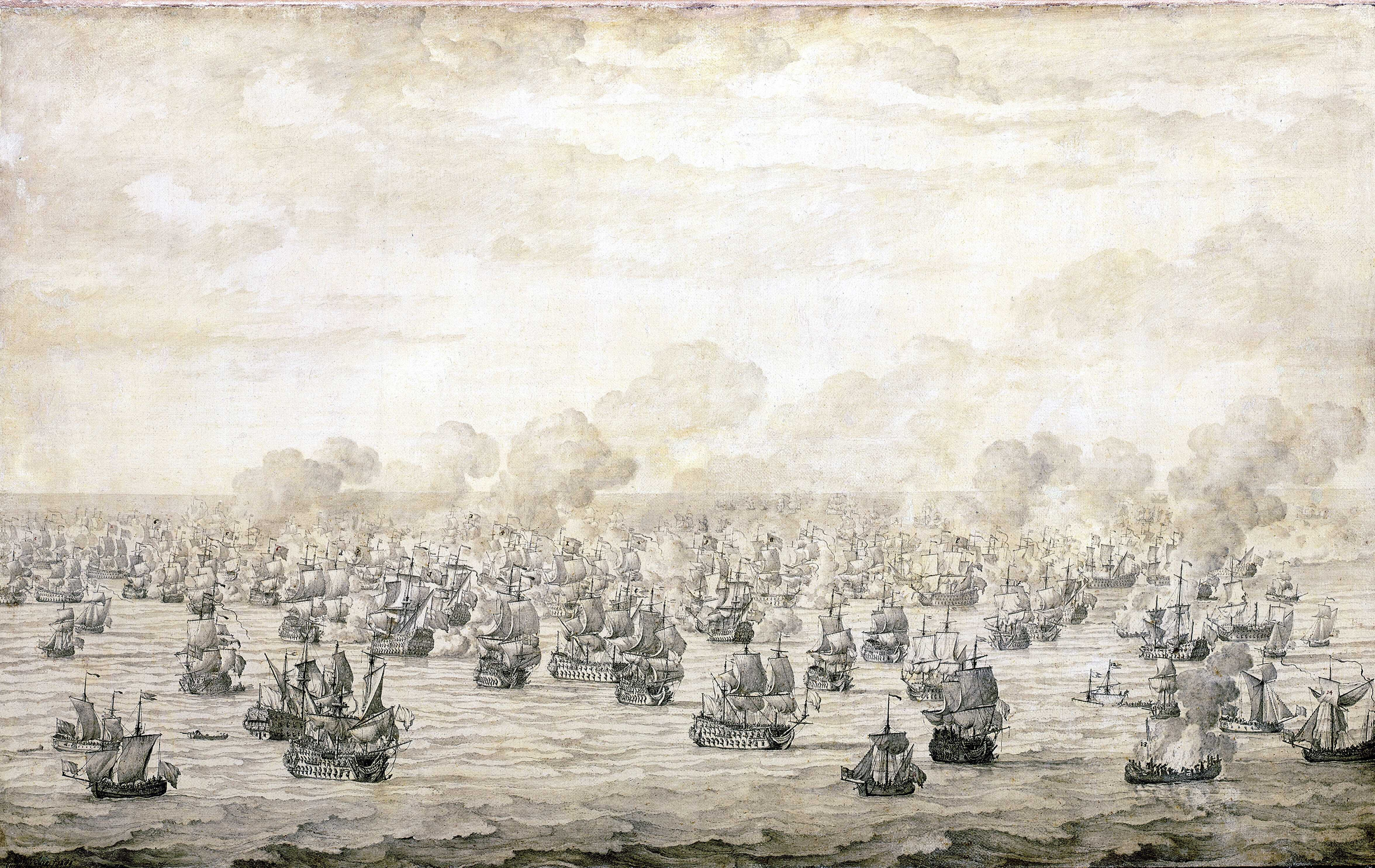
June 7: First Battle of Schooneveld.

1673 (MDCLXXIII) was a common year starting on Sunday of the Gregorian calendar and a common year starting on Wednesday of the Julian calendar, the 1673rd year of the Common Era (CE) and Anno Domini (AD) designations, the 673rd year of the 2nd millennium, the 73rd year of the 17th century, and the 4th year of the 1670s decade. As of the start of 1673, the Gregorian calendar was 10 days ahead of the Julian calendar, which remained in localized use until 1923.

== Events ==
=== January–March ===
- January 22 – Impersonator Mary Carleton is hanged at Newgate Prison in London, for multiple thefts and returning from penal transportation.
- February 10 – Molière's comédie-ballet The Imaginary Invalid premiers in Paris. During the fourth performance, on February 17, the playwright, playing the title rôle, collapses on stage, dying soon after.
- March 29 – Test Act: Roman Catholics and others who refuse to receive the sacrament of the Church of England cannot vote, hold public office, preach, teach, attend the universities or assemble for meetings in England. On June 12, the king's Catholic brother, James, Duke of York, is forced to resign the office of Lord High Admiral because of the Act.

=== April–June ===
- April 27 – Cadmus et Hermione, the first opera written by Jean-Baptiste Lully, premières at the Paris Opera in France.
- May 17 – In America, trader Louis Joliet and Jesuit missionary-explorer Jacques Marquette begin exploring the Mississippi River and the Great Lakes.
- June 7 – First Battle of Schooneveld: In a sea battle of the Third Anglo-Dutch War, fought off the Netherlands coast, the Dutch Republic fleet (commanded by Michiel de Ruyter) defeats the allied Anglo-French fleet, commanded by Prince Rupert of the Rhine.
- June 14 – Second Battle of Schooneveld: The Dutch fleet again defeats the joint Anglo-French fleet.
- June 17 – French explorers Father Jacques Marquette and Louis Joliet reach the headwaters of the Mississippi River, and descend to Arkansas.

=== July–September ===
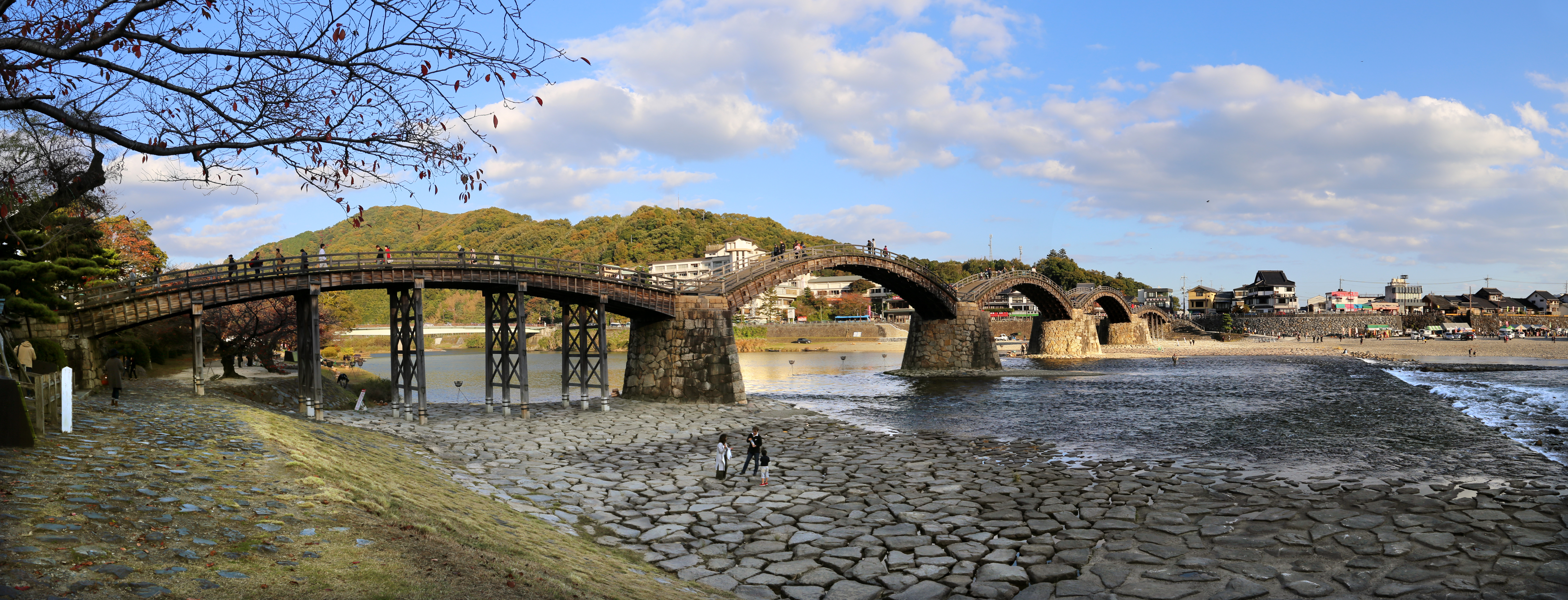
Kintai Bridge officially complete in Japan on October 3

- July 6 – French troops conquer Maastricht.
- July 11 – The Netherlands and Denmark-Norway sign a defense treaty.
- July 24 – Edmund Halley enters The Queen's College, Oxford, as an undergraduate.
- August 8 – In the American colonies, a Dutch battle fleet of 23 ships demands the surrender of New York.
- August 9 – Dutch forces under Admiral Cornelis Evertsen the Youngest recapture New York from the English; the city is known as New Orange until regained by the English in 1674.
- August 21 – Battle of Texel (Kijkduin): The Dutch fleet under Michiel de Ruyter defeats the English and French fleet. This prevents England's Blackheath Army from landing in Zeeland.
- August 30 – Leopold I, Holy Roman Emperor, Spain, Netherlands and the Lutherans form an anti-French covenant.
- September 12 – William, Prince of Orange occupies Naarden, Netherlands.

=== October–December ===
- October 3 – Kintai Bridge is officially completed in Iwakuni, Suō Province (modern-day Yamaguchi Prefecture), Japan.
- November 9 – King Charles II of England removes Anthony Ashley Cooper, 1st Earl of Shaftesbury, from his position as Lord Chancellor.
- November 11 – Battle of Khotyn: Polish and Lithuanian military units, under the command of soon-to-be-king Jan Sobieski, defeat the Turkish army. In this battle, which takes place one day after the death of Poland and Lithuania's monarch, Michał Korybut Wiśniowiecki, the rockets invented by Kazimierz Siemienowicz are successfully used.
- November 13 – Dutch troops commanded by Raimondo Montecuccoli and William, Prince of Orange conquer Bonn.
- November 14 – Christopher Wren is knighted in England.
- November 23 – James, Duke of York, marries Mary of Modena; they meet for the first time immediately before the ceremony in Dover.
- December 8 – Pedro Nuño Colón de Portugal dies only five days after arriving in Mexico City to take office as the new viceroy of New Spain. He is replaced on December 13 by Payo Enríquez de Rivera, the former Roman Catholic Archbishop of Mexico.
- December 19 – King Louis XIV of France issues a decree recognizing the legitimacy of (and giving royal titles to) the three children whom he had sired through his mistress, Madame de Montespan: Louis Auguste, Duke of Maine; Louis César, Count of Vexin; and Louise Françoise, Princess of Condé.
- December 28 – In China, General Wu Sangui begins the Revolt of the Three Feudatories, a rebellion against the Qing dynasty by killing the Governor of the Yunnan province, Zhu Guozhi. Within 10 days, he leads troops on an expedition to take over the neighboring Guizhou province and by 1676 controls 11 of China's provinces.

=== Date unknown ===
- France begins its expedition against Ceylon.
- Chelsea Physic Garden, the second oldest botanic garden in England, is founded by the Society of Apothecaries, for the study of medicinal and other plants.
- The Mitsui family's trading and banking house is founded in Japan.
- The stalactic grotto of Antiparos (Aegean Sea) is discovered.
- Archpriest Petrovich Avvakum writes his Zhitie (Life), as the first Russian autobiography.

== Births ==
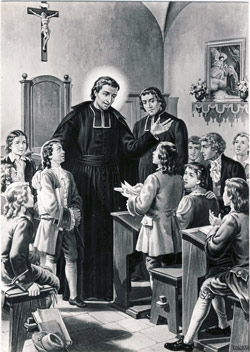
Louis de Montfort

- January 31 – St. Louis Maria Grignion de Montfort, French missionary priest (d. 1716)
- April 27 – Claude Gillot, French artist (d. 1722)
- July 20 – John Dalrymple, 2nd Earl of Stair, Scottish soldier and diplomat (d. 1747)
- August 8 – John Ker, Scottish informer (d. 1726)
- August 10 – Johann Konrad Dippel, German alchemist (d. 1734)
- August 11 – Richard Mead, English physician (d. 1754)
- August 18 – Louise Élisabeth de Joybert, politically active Canadian governors' wife (d. 1740)
- October 26 – Dimitrie Cantemir, Moldavian linguist and scholar (d. 1723)
- December 30 – Ahmed III, Ottoman Sultan (d. 1736)

== Deaths ==
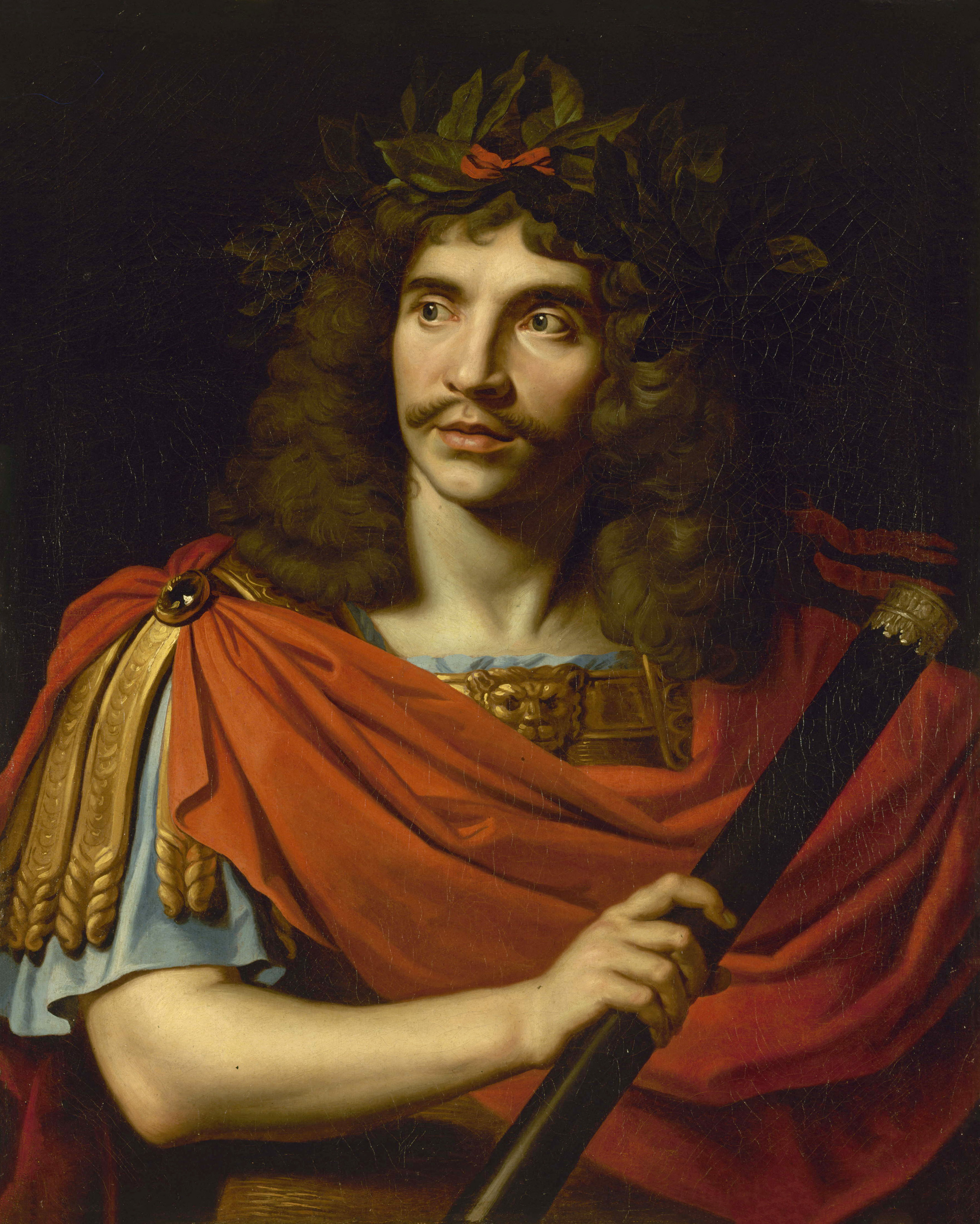
Molière

Margaret Cavendish

- January 11 – Bartholomew Mastrius, Italian theologian (b. 1602)
- January 22 – Mary Carleton, Englishwoman who used false identities (b. 1642)
- January 26 – Jérôme Lalemant, French Jesuit priest and missionary to Canada (b. 1593)
- February 2 – Kaspar Förster, German singer and composer (b. 1616)
- February 12, – Johann Philipp von Schönborn, Archbishop-Elector of Mainz (1647– (b. 1605)
- February 17 – Molière, French writer and actor (b. 1622)
- February 22 – Anna Magdalene of Hanau, German countess (b. 1600)
- March 6 – Isaack Luttichuys, Dutch Golden Age painter (b. 1616)
- March 12 – Margaret Theresa of Spain (b. 1651)
- March 15 – Salvator Rosa, Italian painter and poet (b. 1615)
- March 20
  - Anna Margareta von Haugwitz, Swedish countess (b. 1622)
  - Augustyn Kordecki, Polish prior (b. 1603)
- April 21 – Ignace-Gaston Pardies, French physicist (b. 1636)
- May 14 – Sir Gerrard Napier, 1st Baronet, English politician (b. 1606)
- May 6 – Werner Rolfinck, German physician, chemist, botanist, philosopher (b. 1599)
- May 9 – Jacques Vallée, Sieur Des Barreaux, French poet (b. 1599)
- May 27 – Henry Hungerford, English politician (b. 1611)
- May 30 – Sir Edward Bagot, 2nd Baronet, English politician (b. 1616)
- June 6 – Eugene Maurice, Count of Soissons, Italian noble (b. 1635)
- June 18 – Jeanne Mance, French Canadian settler (b. 1606)
- June 28 – Johan Schatter, Dutch member of the Haarlem schutterij (b. 1594)
- June 25 – Charles de Batz-Castelmore d'Artagnan, French soldier (b. 1611)
- July 4 – Robert Moray, English Freemason (b. 1608 or 1609)
- July 15 – Helena Fourment, Dutch model, second wife of Peter Paul Rubens (b. 1614)
- August 17 – Regnier de Graaf, Dutch physician and anatomist (b. 1641)
- August 21
  - Henry Grey, 1st Earl of Stamford, English soldier (b. c. 1599)
  - Daniel Pawłowski, Polish writer (b. 1627)
  - Isaac Sweers, Dutch admiral (b. 1622)
- August 25 – Bartram de Fouchier, Dutch painter (b. 1609)
- September 6 – Jan Thomas van Ieperen, Flemish engraver and painter (b. 1617)
- September 21 – Lorenzo Imperiali, Italian cardinal (b. 1612)
- October 5 – Francesco Grue, Italian artist (b. 1618)
- October 13 – Christoffer Gabel, Danish statesman (b. 1617)
- October 17 – Thomas Clifford, 1st Baron Clifford of Chudleigh, English statesman (b. 1630)
- November 6 – Robert Harley, English politician (b. 1626)
- November 10 – Michał Korybut Wiśniowiecki, King of Poland (b. 1640)
- November 17 – Thomas Wendy, English politician (b. 1614)
- November 29 – Armand de Gramont, Comte de Guiche, French nobleman (b. 1637)
- December 15 – Margaret Cavendish, English writer (b. 1623)
- December 21 – Joan Blaeu, Dutch cartographer (b. 1596)
- December 29 – Manuel da Câmara III, Portuguese noble (b. 1630)
- December 31 – Oliver St John, English statesman and judge (b. c. 1598)
