= Expositor =

Expositor or Expository may refer to:

== Publications ==
- An English Expositor (pub. 1616), an early dictionary
- Brantford Expositor, a newspaper in Brantford, Ontario
- Nauvoo Expositor, a former newspaper in Nauvoo, Illinois
- Review & Expositor (est. 1904), an academic journal of theology
- The Expository Times (est. 1889), an academic journal of theology
- Vine's Expository Dictionary (pub 1940), a cross reference of English New Testament words to original Greek texts

== Other ==
- Expository address, a competitive debate event in the National Forensic League
- Expository preaching, a form of preaching that explains a passage of scripture
- EcoCentro Expositor Querétaro, an exposition centre in El Marqués, Querétaro

== See also ==
- Exposition (narrative)
