= 1683 in literature =

This article contains information about the literary events and publications of 1683.

== Events ==
- May 17 – Jordaan Luchtmans, the predecessor of Brill Publishers, is registered as a bookseller by the Leiden booksellers' guild.
- May 25 – Lancelot Addison is appointed Dean of Lichfield.
- June 26 – Madame de La Fayette is widowed.
- August/September – John Locke flees to the Netherlands, under suspicion of involvement in the Rye House Plot in England.
- November 4 – Marriage of André Dacier and Anne Lefèvre in Paris.
- December 7 – English parliamentarian Algernon Sidney is executed for treason, based largely on the anti-monarchist views expressed in his Discourses Concerning Government, in manuscript
- unknown dates
  - John Banks' historical play The Innocent Usurper, about Lady Jane Grey, is banned from the stage by the censors.
  - A public library is first recorded at Kirkwall on Orkney.

== New books ==
=== Fiction ===
- Alexander Oldys (?) – The London Jilt; or, the Politick Whore
- "Abbé du Prat" (pseudonym) – Venus in the Cloister; or, The Nun in her Smock (Vénus dans le cloître, ou la Religieuse en chemise)

=== Drama ===
- Joshua Barnes – Landgartha, or the Amazon Queen of Denmark and Norway
- Chikamatsu Monzaemon – Yotsugi Soga (The Soga Successors/The Soga Heir)
- John Crowne – City Politiques
- John Dryden and Nathaniel Lee – The Duke of Guise
- Nathaniel Lee – Constantine the Great
- Thomas Otway – The Atheist
- Edward Ravenscroft – Dame Dobson
- Sor Juana Inés de la Cruz – Los empeños de una casa (The Trials of a Noble House)
- Pedro Calderon de la Barca – El pintor de su deshonra

=== Poetry ===
- Robert Gould – Love Given O'er: Or a Satyr on the Inconstancy of Woman

=== Non-fiction ===
- "R. B." (i. e. Nathaniel Crouch), compiled – Two Journeys to Jerusalem
- John Dryden – Plutarch (one of the first biographies in the English language)
- Joseph Moxon – Mechanick Exercises
- John Pordage – Theologia Mystica
- Dr. Thomas Sydenham – Tractatus de podagra et hydrope

== Births ==
- April 3 – Mark Catesby, English naturalist (died 1749)
- December 27 – Conyers Middleton, English controversialist and cleric (died 1750)

== Deaths ==
- January 15 – Philip Warwick, English writer and politician (born 1609)
- March 19 – Thomas Killigrew, English dramatist and manager (born 1612)
- August – Ralph Josselin, English diarist and Anglican cleric (born 1616)
- August 24 – John Owen, English theologian (born 1616)
- October 20 – Marie-Catherine de Villedieu, French novelist and dramatist (born 1640)
- November 18 – Innokentiy Gizel, Ukrainian historian (born c. 1600)
- December 15 – Izaak Walton, English writer and biographer (born 1593)
