= Bullokar =

Bullokar is a surname. Notable people with the surname include:

- John Bullokar (1574–1627), English physician and lexicographer
- William Bullokar (16th century), English linguist
