= Christmas, His Masque =

Play written by Ben Jonson

Christmas, His Masque, also called Christmas His Show, was a Jacobean-era masque, written by Ben Jonson and performed at the English royal court at Christmas of 1616. Jonson's masque displays the traditional folklore and iconography of Christmas at an early-modern and pre-commercial stage of its development.

== The masque ==
The masque opens with the entrance of a personified Christmas and his attendants, one of whom leads the way in, beating a drum. Christmas is dressed in a doublet and hose (color unspecified) and a "high-crowned hat;" he has a "long thin beard" and white shoes. Christmas is soon followed by his ten children, who are led in, on a string, by Cupid (who is dressed like a London apprentice, with his wings at his shoulders). The "Sons and Daughters" of Christmas are Carol, Misrule, Gambol, Offering, Wassail, Mumming, New-Year's-Gift, Post and Pair, and even Minced-Pie and Baby-Cake. Each has his or her own fantastic get-up. Carol, for instance, wears a tawny coat and a red cap, and has a flute in his belt. Mince-Pie is attired "like a fine cook's wife, drest neat," while Gambol is dressed "like a tumbler, with a hoop and bells." Each of the ten is followed by a torchbearer-attendant, carrying marchpanes, cakes, bottles of wine, and other holiday gear. (The specific details of the costumes and furnishings, like "an orange and rosemary, but not a clove to stick in it," participate in a dense web of folklore connections. Baby-Cake comes last in the procession of children, for example, because miniature "twelvetide" cakes were associated with Twelfth Night, the last day of the Christmas holiday season.)

Cupid is soon joined by his mother Venus, who like her son is dressed down in contemporary London garb: the goddess appears as a "deaf tire-woman" who lives in Pudding Lane. The speeches of Venus and the other characters are rich in contemporary allusions and references; Venus, for example, mentions Richard Burbage and John Heminges, prominent actors with the King's Men. The masque proceeds to singing and dancing, with the stated intent to present "A right Christmas, as of old it was."

== Publication ==
Christmas, His Masque was produced too late to be included in the first folio collection of Jonson's works in 1616; it was the first masque in the second folio of 1641. It also exists in manuscripts.

== Critical significance ==
Early commentators tended to dismiss Jonson's masque as a piece of holiday fluff, often noting that the work is less a true masque and more of a mummers' show. Modern critics have looked beneath its surface to detect serious political, social, and cultural implications. Jonson's text, in promoting a traditional Christmas, was taking a position favored by King James I and opposed to the contemporary culture of the merchants of the City of London and especially that of the Puritans, who were overtly hostile to the traditional holiday. The text of the masque shows an abundant and rather biting satire aimed at the anti-Christmas forces in Jacobean society.

King James had made an important speech before the Star Chamber earlier in 1616, in an attempt to promote traditional country life and pastimes, which were plainly in decline in an era of ever-greater urbanization and economic development. James would soon issue his proclamation known as the Book of Sports (1618), another attempt to support and reinforce the traditional country life in the face of rapid social change. Jonson's masque is one element in this larger cultural debate.

== Sources ==
- Collins, Tony. Encyclopedia of Traditional British Rural Sports. London, Routledge, 2005.
- Evans, Robert C. Jonson and the Contexts of His Time. Lewisburg, PA, Bucknell University Press, 1994.
- Marcus, Leah Sinanoglou. The Politics of Mirth: Jonson, Herrick, Milton, Marvell, and the Defense of Old Holiday Pastimes. Chicago, University of Chicago Press, 1986.
