= Philippe Balthazar de Gand =

French nobleman (1616–1680)

- Born: 4 October 1616
- Died: 27 February 1680 (aged 63)
- Occupation: Nobleman
- Spouse: Luisa Sarmiento Enríquez
- Awards: Knight of the Order of the Golden Fleece

Philippe Balthazar de Gand (4 October 1616 – 27 February 1680), Count of Isenghien, was a French nobleman and Knight of the Order of the Golden Fleece.

Philippe Balthazar was born on 4 October 1616, the son of Philippe Lamoral de Gand, Count of Isenghien and Marguerite Isabelle de Mérode. He succeeded his father as Count of Isenghien at his father's death in 1631. He married Luisa Sarmiento Enríquez and their children included a daughter and a son who succeeded him and assumed his titles.

In 1644 he was made a Knight of the Order of the Golden Fleece.

He died in February 1680.
