= Shimozuma Chūkō =

Japanese monk

Shimozuma Nakataka (下間仲孝) (1551–1616) was a Jodo Shinshu Buddhist priest within Hongan-ji.

The comings and goings of the temple were administered by Nakataka. At the same time in which Hongan-ji Kennyo fought against Oda Nobunaga, he led the defenses in the siege of Ishiyama Hongan-ji.
