= The London Jilt =

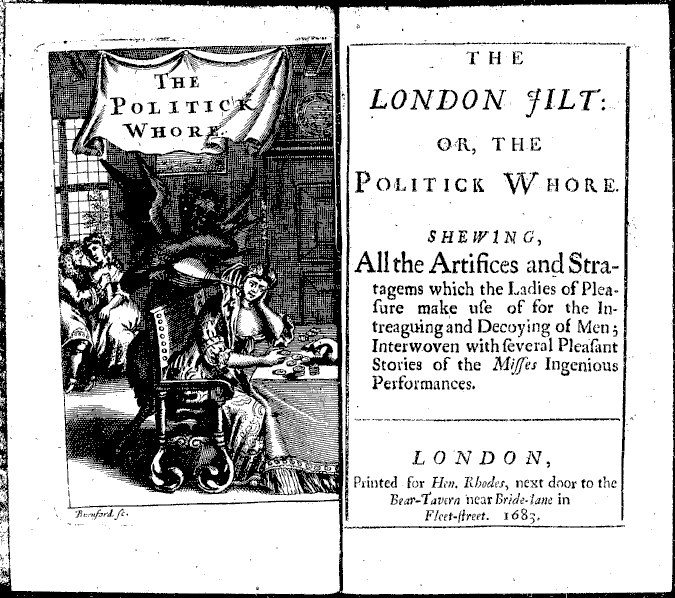
- Author: Alexander Oldys
- Original title: The London jilt, or, the politick whore: shewing, all the artifices and stratagems which the ladies of pleasure make use of for the intreaguing and decoying of men, interwoven with several pleasant stories of the misses ingenious performances
- Language: English
- Genre: Pornography, prose tale
- Publisher: Henry Rhodes
- Publication date: 1683
- Publication place: England

The London Jilt; Or, the Politick Whore is an English prose tale published anonymously in 1683, ostensibly relating the memoirs of a London courtesan. Part of the English tradition of the "Restoration rake," the book, once attributed to Alexander Oldys, achieved popularity in both England and the American Colonies.

== Content ==
Its introduction advertises the subject of the book, a prostitute and her tricks, as "set before thee as a Beacon to warn thee of the Shoales and Quick-sands, on which thou wilt of necessity Shipwrack thy All, if thou blindly and wilfully continuest and perseverest in steering that Course of Female Debauchery, which will inevitably prove at length thy utter Destruction." With a reference to the Book of Genesis, the anonymous author warns the male reader to "Avoid all their [i.e., the "Detestable Creatures"'] Cursed Allurement, and be mindful that a Snake lies concealed under such bewitching Appearances, and how beautiful and attractive soever the outside of the Apple may be, that it is Rotten and Pestilent at Core." Despite the author's moralistic stance, the narrative, according to Roger Thompson, is completely amoral.

The narrative itself features Cornelia, who, because her father has got into financial trouble, is forced to prostitute herself, along with her mother. She chooses, however, to become an independent sexual entrepreneur rather than to continue working from her mother's house or for another bawd. While she claims to be kept only by one man, Valere, who houses and pays her, she has in fact numerous other clients, each of whom thinks he is her only one. When she gets pregnant, she successfully convinces Valere that he is the father, and he rewards her financially. The child is stillborn, and she tells Valere she will only have another child if he grants her an annuity; he dies twelve days after he signs the paperwork. After Valere's death, Cornelia takes on another lover, Philander, to whom she also offers a pregnancy.

== Authorship ==
The author is unknown. Roger Thompson, in a 1975 article published in the Harvard Library Bulletin, proposed that the author was to be sought in the school of Richard Head (author of The English Rogue, 1665) and Francis Kirkman, both famous for their roguish works, and "catering for a bawdy-minded bourgeois readership." Some scholars have claimed Alexander Oldys as the author, but as Charles Hinnant argues in his recent scholarly edition of The London Jilt, this was due to Arundell Esdaile, a bibliographer, who, in his List of English Tales and Prose Romances (1912), attributed The London Jilt to Oldy, confusing this novel with Oldys' The Female Gallant, or The Female Cuckold (1692), which had as a variant title The London Jilt, or The Female Cuckold (p. 11).

== Popularity, critical reception ==
=== Contemporary popularity ===
Hinnant, the book's most recent editor, concludes that The London Jilt must have been quite popular considering the widespread usage of the name in the title, which was incorporated, for instance, in the biography of a criminal woman.

In the United States, The London Jilt was part of what Jules Paul Seigel in The New England Quarterly called "Puritan light reading," that is, the kind of literature enjoyed by Puritans in the New England colonies. Roger Thompson's analysis of early American book auctions also attests to its popularity, and Theo Hermans states it was "all the rage in both England and America." It was one of the books ordered by the Boston bookseller John Usher specifically for Puritan minister Increase Mather, and appears to have been enjoyed by other "Puritan Saints" as well. In fact, Usher's sales records listed two copies sold of The London Jilt, and James D. Hart, in The Popular Book: A History of America's Literary Taste, surmises that it "would probably have sold more than two copies if Usher's reorder had not been returned marked 'out of print and not to be had.'"

=== Critical appreciation ===
According to Theo Hermans, who places The London Jilt in a European picaresque tradition of bawdy literature, the book "stands comparison with" La Princesse de Clèves (1678), generally regarded as the first European novel. Hermans praises the female narrator's realistic description of the world and her "psychological elaboration." Other modern critics are less positive: while the book promises to expose the "'artifices and stratagems' of a London street girl," Jules Paul Seigel saw that as merely an excuse to relate a "string of low-life incidents"; he called the humor "unsophisticated and anal."

Modern feminist critics, however, have come to a different appreciation of the book and its main character: Melissa Mowry, in The bawdy politic in Stuart England, 1660-1714: political pornography and prostitution, praises Cornelia for successfully manipulating "the conventions of the heteronormative marketplace." The novel as also attracted attention from scholars of disfigurement and appearance: Cornelia's mother suffers from smallpox, which grossly mars her face, making the book "an early example of many similar narratives presenting smallpox disfigurement as just punishment for over-reaching femininity," though scholars also note that the titular character herself does not suffer such a fate.

== Editions ==
The book was printed by Henry Rhodes, who specialized in erotica. Soon after publication in England, the book was translated into French and German. A second, corrected edition in English appeared in 1684.

The book was republished in 2008 by Broadview Press, edited by Charles H. Hinnant, based on a copy in the Harvard University Library. This copy, bound in calf, was owned by Narcissus Luttrell, an English historian and avid book collector, many of whose books ended up in the United States; he inscribed it "Nar. Luttrell His Book 1685."
