= Dorothy Leigh =

- Born: Dorothy Kemp (or Kempe); Unknown; England
- Died: c. 1616; England
- Occupation: Writer
- Spouse: Ralph Leigh
- Writing career
- Notable work: The Mother's Blessing

Dorothy Leigh (née Kemp or Kempe; died c. 1616) was a 17th-century English writer remembered for The Mother's Blessing (1616).

== Biography ==
Dorothy Kemp (or Kempe) was the daughter of William Kemp (or Robert Kemp), of Finchingfield, Essex. She married Ralph Leigh of Cheshire (or Ralph Lee of Sussex), a soldier under the Earl of Essex at Cádiz.

The Mother's Blessing was dedicated to the Princess Elizabeth, wife to the Count Palatine. It includes a prefixed a poem entitled "Counsell to my Children, George, John, and William Leigh". In 1626, her son William was appointed Rector of Groton, in Suffolk.

Dorothy Leigh died in or before 1616.

== Selected works ==
- 1616, The mothers blessing, or, The godly counsaile of a gentle-woman not long since deceased, left behind her for her children : containing many good exhortations, and godly admonitions, profitable for all parents to leave as a legacy to their children, but especially for those, who by reason of their young yeeres stand most in need of instruction
