= Mary Carleton =

English socialite, fraudster (1642–1673)

- Born: Mary Moders; 11 August 1642; Canterbury, England
- Died: 22 January 1673 (aged 30); Tyburn, London, England
- Resting place: St Martin's Churchyard, London, England
- Other name: Mary Stedman
- Known for: Marriage fraud
- Spouses: Thomas Stedman; John Carleton (m. 1663)
- Children: 2 (died in infancy)
- Status: Executed by hanging
- Convictions: Petty theft Returning from penal transportation
- Penalty: Death

Mary Carleton (born Mary Moders; 11 August 1642 – 22 January 1673) was an English socialite and fraudster who became famous for using a number of false identities, such as a German princess, to marry and defraud upper-class men.

== Early life ==
Born Mary Moders in Canterbury. Her father was a fiddle player. According to later accounts she married a journeyman shoemaker named Thomas Stedman and gave birth to two children who died in infancy. She later left her husband to move to Dover where she married a surgeon by the name of Thomas Day, prompting her arrest and trial in Maidstone for bigamy.

After the trial she visited Cologne where she had a brief affair with a local nobleman. He gave her valuable presents, pressed her for marriage and began the preparations for a wedding. She, however, slipped out of Germany with all the presents and most of her landlady's money, returning to England through the Netherlands.

== Life of crime ==
She returned to London in 1663 and took on the persona of an orphaned Princess van Wolway from Cologne. She claimed that she was born in Cologne and that her father was Henry van Wolway, Lord of Holmstein and that she had fled a possessive lover. In April 1663, she used this guise to marry a surgeon John Carleton, who was the brother-in-law of the landlord of the Exchange tavern which she frequented. After the wedding, however, an anonymous letter exposed her.

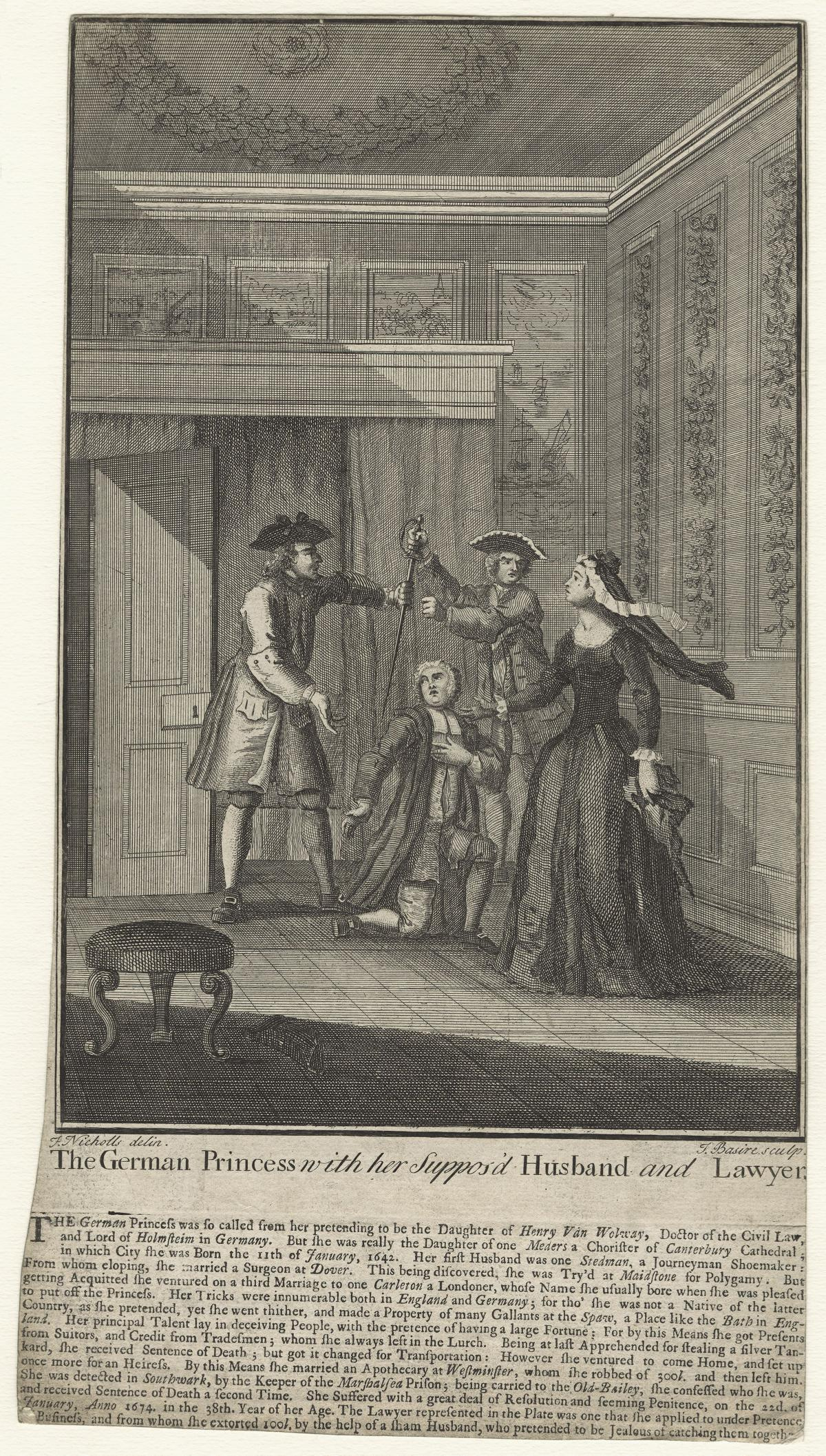
James Basire, engraving of Mary Carleton as The German Princess with her Suppos'd Husband and Lawyer.

Her trial in 1663 was the first recorded appearance of Mary Carleton. She was charged for masquerading as a German princess and marrying John Carleton in London under that identity. She claimed that John Carleton himself had claimed to be a lord, and was only trying to extract himself from marriage as he had discovered there was no money in it. Both sides of the conflict published pamphlets to support their own story. Mary Carleton was eventually acquitted.

Afterwards Mary Carleton wrote her own account, The Case of Madam Mary Carleton, under her own name directly addressing Prince Rupert. She also acted in a play about her life and gained a number of admirers who gave her more valuable gifts. She eventually married one of her admirers. Predictably she left him too, taking with her his money, valuables and keys while he was drunk.

Carleton next pretended to be a rich virgin heiress fleeing an undesirable suitor whom her father had arranged for her. She even arranged that someone would send her letters that supposedly contained updates of family news. When her new landlady found and read them, she was convinced and became a matchmaker between Carleton and her nephew.

Carleton arranged a new letter: it claimed that her brother was dead and he had left her all he had, including her father's forthcoming inheritance, but that her father intended marrying her to a suitor she detested. Her lover invited her to live with him but Carleton and an accomplice, disguised as a maid, stole his money.

Over the following ten years Carleton used similar methods to defraud various other men and landlords, often with the aid of her maid. Some of the men were too embarrassed to reveal they had been duped. She was many times accused of theft but was jailed only briefly.

== Incarceration and execution ==
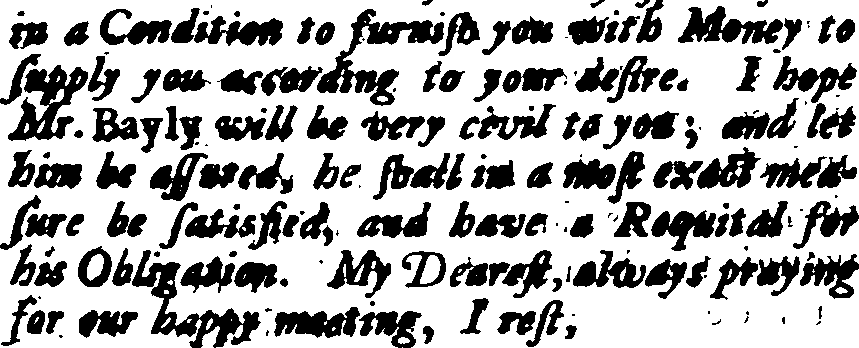

She was once arrested after stealing a silver tankard, and was sentenced to penal transportation and sent to Port Royal, Jamaica in 1671, where she worked as a prostitute. However, in 1672, she either sneaked or conned her way aboard a ship and returned to London, again pretending to be a rich heiress and married an apothecary at Westminster, but stole his money and left him.

In December 1672, Carleton was captured when a turnkey from Newgate Prison, while searching for stolen loot at that time, recognized her. On 16 January 1673 she was tried in the Old Bailey. Because she had returned from penal transportation without permission, she was sentenced to death. She tried to plead the belly, but a jury of matrons was brought in to examine her, and found that this was not the case.

At the place of execution at Tyburn, she told the waiting crowd that she had been a very vain woman, yet she hoped God would forgive her, as she forgave her enemies. Carleton was hanged on 22 January 1673. She was buried at the St. Martin's Churchyard. Later, someone wrote on her grave:

The German Princess here, against her will, lies underneath, and yet, oh strange! lies still.

In 1673 Francis Kirkman wrote, and issued under his own name, The Counterfeit Lady Unveiled, a fictional autobiography.
