= Johannes Gysius =

Dutch historian and minister (c. 1583-1652)

Johannes Gysius (c.1583–1652) was a Dutch historian and minister.

Gysius was born in Ostend, Belgium around 1583. He was married twice. His second wife was named Petronella Michiel Matthijsdr. The couple married in Dordrecht in South Holland on 8 August 1617. The couple had one daughter, named Sara. She was born in 1630 in Streefkerk. He died in 1652 in Streefkerk.

In 1616, his main work, Oorsprong en voortgang der Nederlandtscher beroerten (Origin and progress of the disturbances in the Netherlands) about the Dutch Revolt, was published anonymously. It describes the crimes committed by the Spanish rulers under Philip II against the Dutch population. The book is illustrated with depictions of atrocities that leave little to the imagination. The work was also seen by some as an indictment of the Catholic Church, but that was not the original intention. The reason Gijsius initially had the work published anonymously is because the book was published during the period of the Twelve Years' Truce with the Spaniards, and he did not wish to antagonise the proponents of that peace. However, that he was the writer must have been known, because the city of Dordrecht paid him 50 guilders for the work.
