= Kaspar Förster =

German singer and composer

Kaspar Förster (also Caspar Foerster) (baptized 28 February 1616 in Danzig – 2 February 1673 in Oliva, near Danzig) was a German singer and composer.

Förster studied music under his father Kaspar (1574-1652) and then under Marco Scacchi in Warsaw. He sang bass and conducted choirs at the Polish court in Warsaw from 1638 to about 1643, then served as kapellmeister to Frederik III of Denmark in Copenhagen between 1652 and 1655. In 1655, a war broke out between Denmark and Sweden, and Förster returned to Danzig, working as cantor at the Marienkirche there. He returned to the employ of Frederik from 1661 to 1667. During this time he visited Venice several times and played a role in bringing aspects of Italian musical style to northern Europe. He also studied under Giacomo Carissimi in the 1660s. Late in his life he worked briefly in Hamburg before returning to his birthplace.

Förster's surviving works are mostly sacred cantatas for three voices, with two violins and continuo. Some 35 survive, and they often contain very low and difficult bass parts. His other works include two oratorios, six trio sonatas, and four secular cantatas.

== Recordings ==
- Il Tempo Ensemble; Kaspar Förster; Paula Chateauneuf; Olʹha Pasichnyk; Marta Boberska; Kai Wessel (1999). Vanitas Vanitatum. Accord (CD Label). OCLC 47727186.
