= Isaack Luttichuys =

Dutch painter

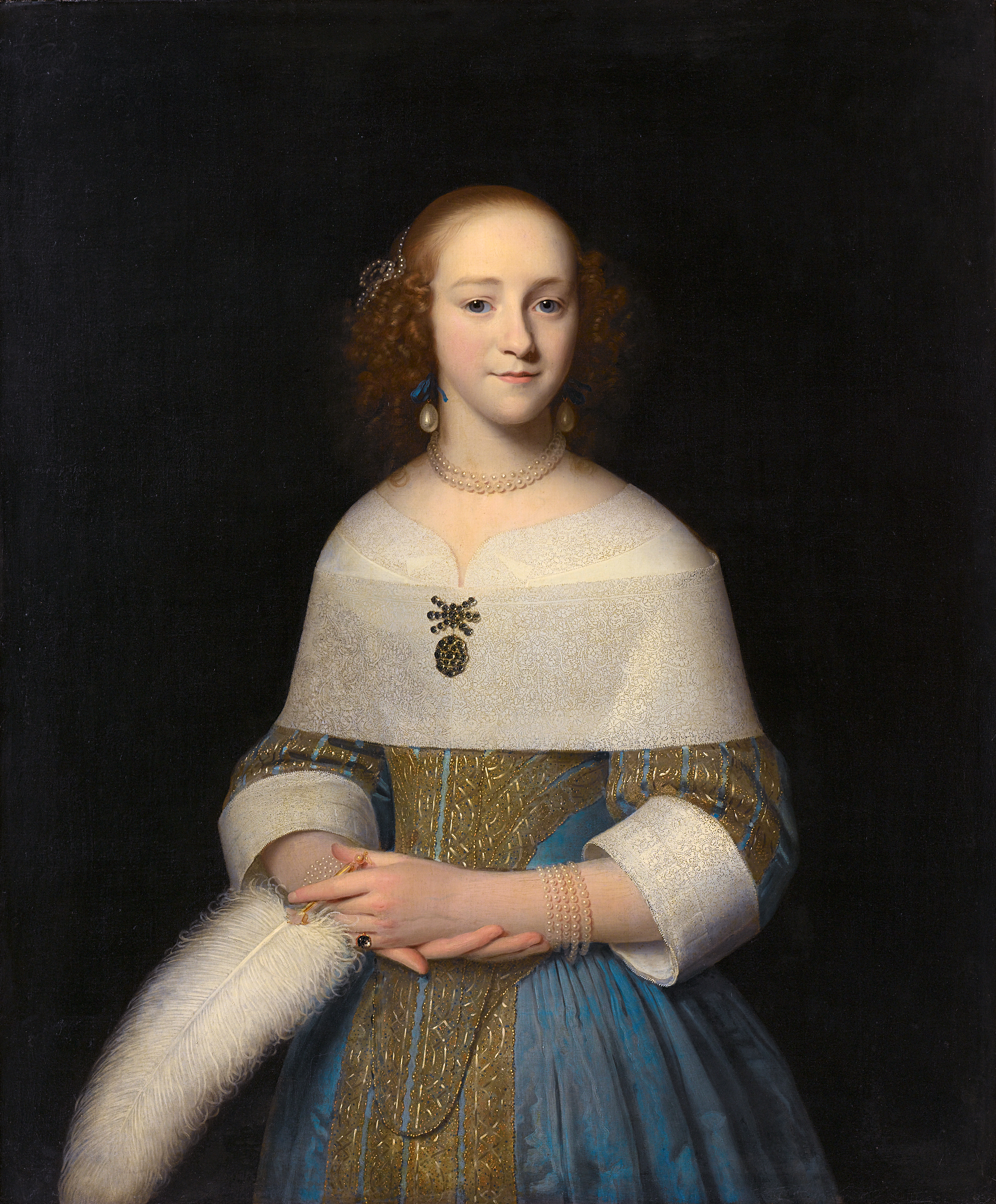
Young woman with an ostrich feather in her hand. (1656)

Isaack Luttichuys (25 February 1616 (baptized) – 6 March 1673 (buried)) was a Dutch Golden Age painter.

== Biography ==
Luttichuys was born in London. According to the RKD He was the brother of the painter Simon Luttichuys, and had moved to Amsterdam by 1643, where he became engaged in 1643 to Elisabeth Adolfs Winck. She may have died, however, since in 1648 his son Isaack was baptised and the mother was Sara Grabey. A daughter Katryna was baptised in 1650, and the mother was Sara Grelant. He is known for fruit and vanitas still life paintings and portraits. He influenced the painter Pieter Nason.

He died in Amsterdam.
