= Jeremias Felbinger =

German Socinian writer, teacher, and lexicographer

Jeremias Felbinger (27 April 1616 – c. 1690) was a German Socinian writer, teacher, and lexicographer.

Felbinger was born in Brzeg. He taught in Koszalin, Helmstadt, Bernstadt auf dem Eigen, Greifswald, and Wrocław, and lived at a "Strasswitz" near Gdańsk.

He corresponded with John Biddle (Unitarian) e.g. 1654. Like many Socinian exiles in Amsterdam he appears to have died there in poverty.

== Works ==
Felbinger's most significant works are perhaps his translation of the Remonstrant edition of the Greek New Testament into German, his Greek-German Lexicon of the New Testament, and his "Christian Handbook". A comprehensive list of works is given by Christopher Sand in Bibliotheca Anti-Trinitariorum.

- 1648 Nomenclatura Latino-Germana
- 1646 Rhetorica
- 1646 Politicae Christianae Dutch 1660
- 1653 Demonstrationes Christianae
- 1651 Christliches Handbüchlein. Dutch: Christelyke Handboeksken 1675. English translation Christian Handbook 1975.
- 1657 Greek-German Lexicon of the New Testament.
- 1660 German New Testament, translation from the Greek edition of "Stephani Curcellaei" 1655 i.e. of Étienne de Courcelles (Curcellaeus) (1586–1659) the French translator of Grotius.
- 1675 Doctrina Syllogistica
