= An English Expositor =

1616 dictionary by John Bullokar

An English Expositor: teaching the interpretation of the hardest words used in our language, with sundry explications, descriptions and discourses is a dictionary of hard words compiled by John Bullokar and first published in London in 1616.

The book is significant as the second monolingual dictionary to be printed in the English language. Its aim, as laid out in the preface, was to catalogue the "great store of strange words" in the English language, and "open the signification of such words, to the capacitie of the ignorant". It was extensive in scope, covering not only foreign loanwords and words that had become obsolete, but also terms associated with science and philosophy. It contained twice as many entries as its sole predecessor, Cawdrey's A Table Alphabeticall, from which it borrowed heavily.

John Bullokar lived only to see the second edition of his book, but at least sixteen more editions and revisions appeared over the next 150 years, including An English Expositor, or, Compleat Dictionary (1698), and The English Expositor Improv'd (1719).
