= John Bullokar =

John Bullokar (1574–1627) was an English physician and lexicographer. He was born in St Andrew's parish, Chichester, Sussex, and baptized there on 8 November 1574, third of four known children of Elizabeth and William Bullokar.

Staunch Roman Catholics, the William Bullokar family was forced to move and was excommunicated on several occasions. The second son, Thomas Bullokar (also known as John Baptist Martyr) became a Franciscan and, in 1642, was hanged, drawn, and quartered at Tyburn for celebrating mass. John Bullokar, presumably because of his religion, obtained his medical degree away from England, at Caen, France, on 16 October 1612.

John Bullokar was the author of "An English Expositor: Teaching the Interpretation of the Hardest Words Used in our Language" (1616) and "A True Description of the Passion of our Saviour Jesus Christ, a poem in six-line stanzas" (1622). For his contribution to the development of the English dictionary, John Bullokar is recognized by linguists and lexicographers.

The "Expositor" treated Latin and Greek loanwords of Renaissance English, drawing from many contemporaneous sources, ranging from Robert Cawdrey's alphabetical and Thomas's Latin–English dictionaries to specialist glossaries. Many revised editions were published up to 1775, but John Bullokar lived to see only the second of these editions (1621). He died in 1627 and was buried in St Andrew's parish on 2 January 1628.

== Sources ==
- Bentley, James. "Bullokar, John (bap. 1574, died 1637)". Oxford Dictionary of National Biography (online ed.). Oxford University Press. doi:10.1093/ref:odnb/3925. (Subscription or UK public library membership required.). Viewed 2 March 2008. The first edition of this text is available at Wikisource: "Bullokar, John" . Dictionary of National Biography. London: Smith, Elder & Co. 1885–1900.
