= Martin Lluelyn =

UK poet, physician and soldier

Martin Lluelyn (1616–1682; alias Llewellin) was a poet, physician and soldier from a family of old Welsh extraction long established in Wells, Somerset. Born in London to a long-serving Steward of St Bartholomew's Hospital who was also an expert Cartographer, he took his degrees at the University of Oxford in the 1630s and 1640s, and remained there with a studentship until 1648, performing military service on behalf of the King, who made his college of Christ Church a headquarters during the Civil War. During this time a substantial volume of his English poetry was published which, showing great versatility and facility in comic, satirical and elegiac moods, and a strong Royalist sympathy, gained a popular readership. He also published Latin poetry. Ejected from Oxford in 1648, he moved to London to practice physic, was awarded M.D., and worked on medical texts with William Harvey and Christopher Bennet. At the time of the Restoration (which he celebrated with verses) he became a Fellow of the Society of Physicians and was sworn Physician to the King, and from 1660 to 1664 was Principal of St Mary Hall, Oxford, receiving a commission as a University Visitor. In 1664 he left Oxford and settled into civic life in High Wycombe, Buckinghamshire, becoming Mayor of that Borough in 1671/72. He was chosen to represent the Borough in 1681 when presenting a loyal address to the King.

== Origins ==
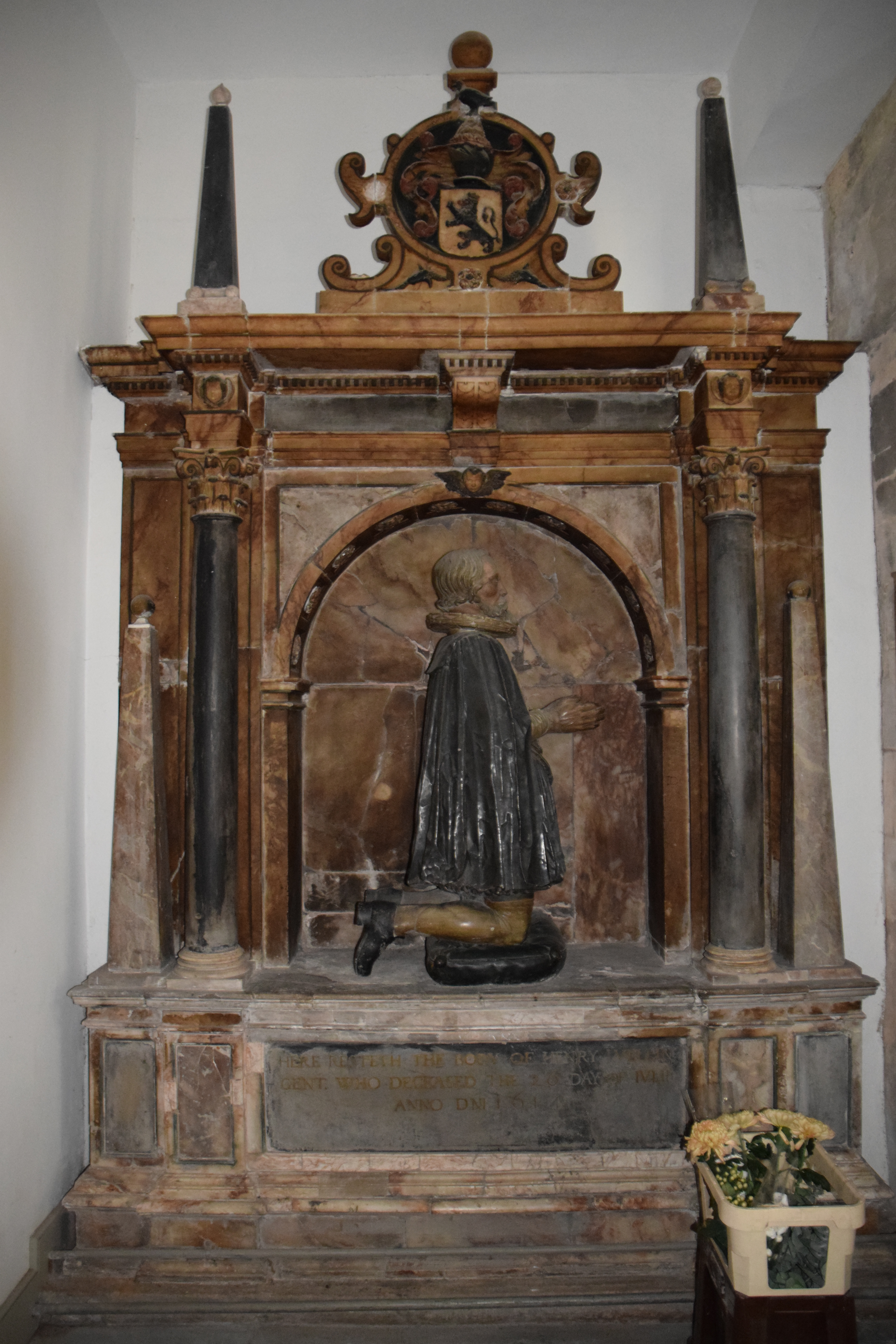
St Cuthbert's, Wells: 1614 monument to Henry Lleuelen, almshouse patron, uncle of Martin the physician.

Although Lluelyn's family background has been thought elusive, his probable descent was from a family of civic prominence in the city of Wells, Somerset, during the Elizabethan era. Maurice Llewellen (also spelled "Fludkyn"), who had some connection with people of the same name in Pucklechurch, Gloucestershire, was admitted to the freedom of the city in 1550 and served twice as Mayor, or Master, in 1553–54 and in 1555–56, and was MP for the city in the fourth Marian Parliament, October 1555. In May 1554, under his Maistry, Queen Mary granted a Charter for the renewal of worship at the civic church of St Cuthbert's, Wells; Elizabeth re-granted, citing this, in 1581. By his will, written and proved in 1568, Maurice provided for his wife Eme, his son Thomas and grandsons Henry ("Harry") and Morrys. Thomas was sworn a burgess of Wells in 1564, and was a member of a deputation to the bishop of Bath and Wells in 1572 to represent the city's chartered rights.

Thomas and his wife were still living in 1614 when their son Henry died, by his will leaving them a lifetime occupancy of his house in Wells. Henry referred to his brothers Morrishe, Martin and William, and his sister Marie Moore, whose husband William Moore he appointed to be his executor. Moore's children Ann, Elizabeth Cannington, Bridget Murrye and Marie Beaumont (with her son William), and also Henry's brother Martin's children, are mentioned. By his will, Henry Lewellin left money to the Wells Corporation for proposed almshouses for six poor women. A very respectable monument was raised to him in St Cuthbert's Church, Wells, in coloured marbles, with a kneeling portrait figure in an arched surround beneath a tinctured entablature, with obelisks and Corinthian columns, surmounted by a large armorial escutcheon, the shield displaying Argent, a lion rampant sable, langued gules, crowned or. The escutcheon also shows a mantled crest of a Cornish chough perched on a rock.

However, as an amendment to the probate in the Canterbury Prerogative Court (Lawe Register) shows, by 1632 William Moore had died leaving the administration of Henry's estate incomplete, and on 9 December 1632 that responsibility was officially assigned to Maurice and Martin Lluellin, brothers of the testator Henry. Maurice, however, a very early investor in the East India Company who was a merchant citizen and Leatherseller of London, died in 1634/35, making a will which leaves no doubt that he was Henry's brother, leaving gifts to Martin Lluelyn's and Ann Moore's children. The almshouses at Priest's Row in Wells were finally established in 1636.

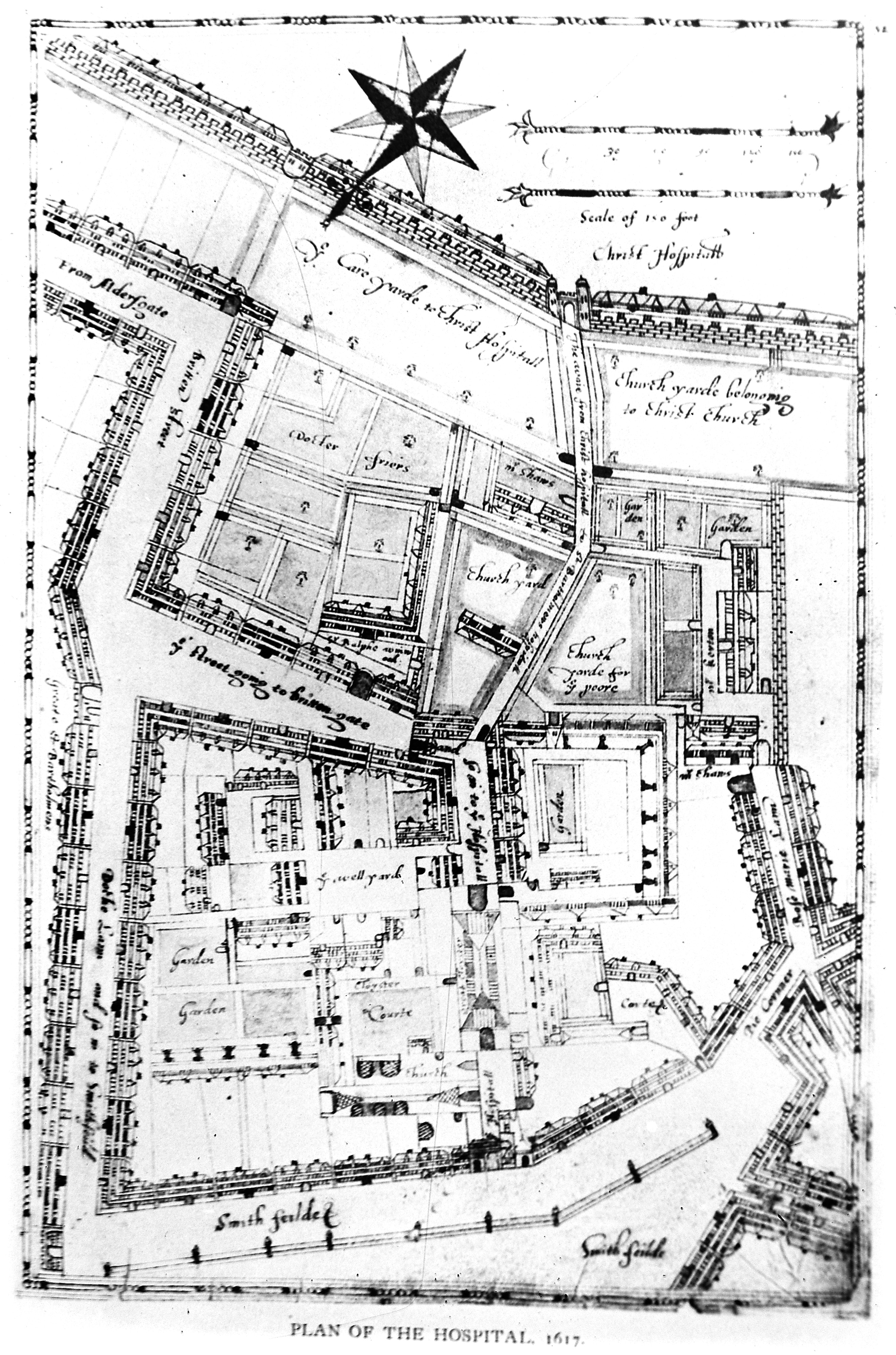
Plan of St Bartholomew's, 1617, from the Plan Book attributed to Martin Lluelin senior.

Martin Lluelyn the Physician-poet was born 12 December 1616, one of the many sons born between 1606 and 1623 of Martin Llewellin of London, and christened at St Bartholomew-the-Less, Smithfield, on 22 December following. That he was the son of Martin Llewellin the Steward of St Bartholomew's Hospital in London (in office 1599–1634) is confirmed by the entry in the Donor's Book of Christ Church, Oxford, recording the donation in 1634 by William and Martin Lluellin of the celebrated Atlas of the East made around 1598 by their father Martin, citizen of London.

The Atlas was apparently based on the elder Martin's personal observations taken during the maritime expedition of Cornelis de Houtman in 1595–1597. Recognized in 1975 as the earliest known sea-atlas made by an Englishman, it was produced on the eve of the foundation of the East India Company and illustrates the sea-routes and lands from the Cape of Good Hope to Java and Japan. Llewellen's Stewardship of St Bartholomew's began soon after the return of Houtman's voyage and kept him occupied in London until his death in 1634. During that time various detailed plans of, or for, the Hospital (including the well-known "Plat of Ye Graye Friers" of 1617) were produced in the same hand as the atlas. The elder Martin was buried at St Bartholomew-the-Less in 1634.

== Education ==
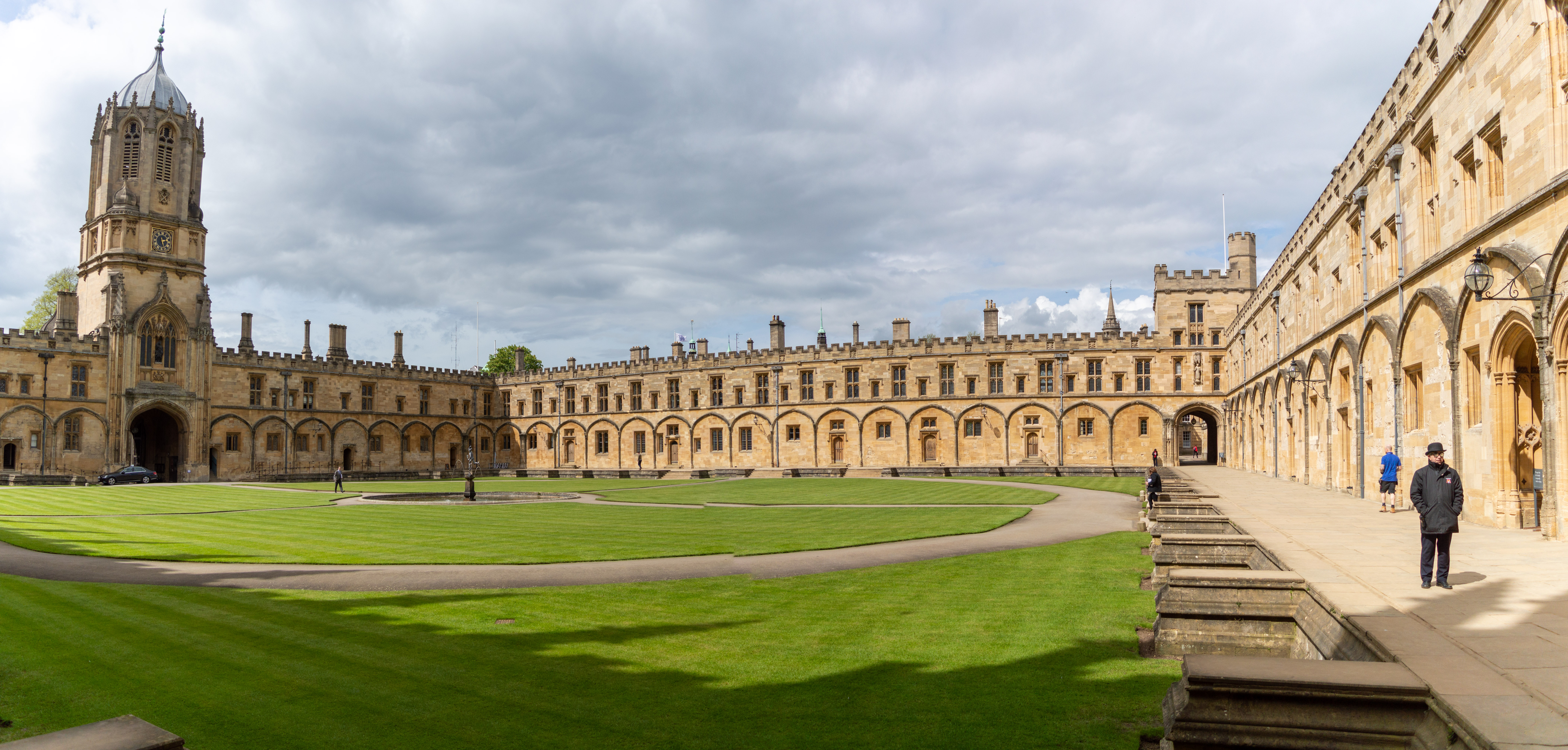
The Great Quad at Christ Church, Oxford

Martin the poet and physician attended Westminster School as a foundation scholar, under the fruitful régime of Lambert Osbaldeston. Although sources (old and new) agree that he was born in 1616, Foster's Alumni Oxonienses (compiled from the University admission registers) states his age as 18 on his matriculation at Christ Church, Oxford on 25 July 1636. Despite this anomaly, it appears that he was aged 18 at the time of his father's death, 1634, and the donation to Christ Church of his father's remarkable Atlas, in which he acted with his elder brother. At Westminster School he was about four years junior to William Cartwright (1611–1643), a brilliant student of his time, poet, orator and philosopher, who proceeded to a studentship at Christ Church in 1628, and matriculated in February 1631/32 aged 20.

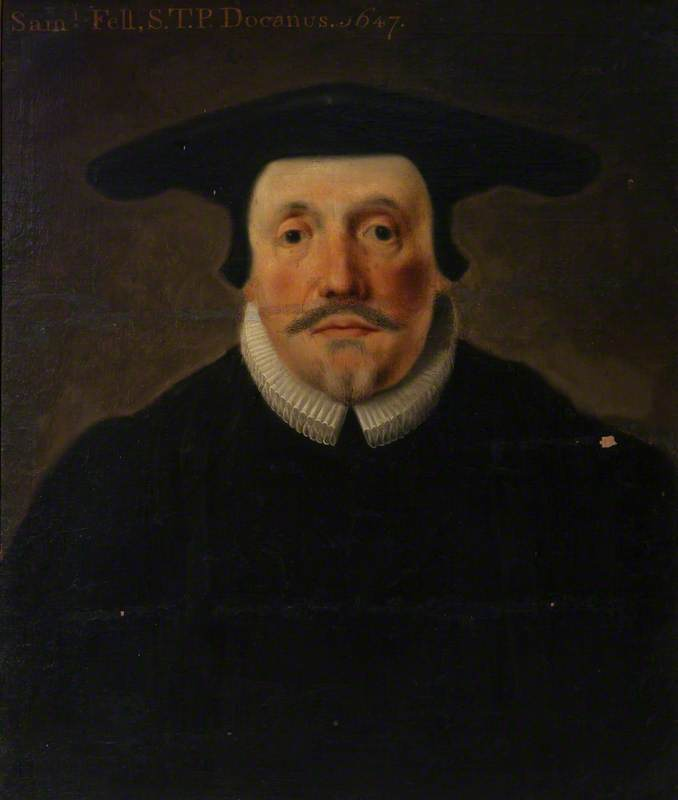
Dr Samuel Fell, Dean of Christ Church 1638-1648

Lluelyn received the degree of BA in July 1640 and MA in May 1643, but continued his studentship at Christ Church through the period of the King's residence there, and the sieges of 1643–1646, until 1648. It was in 1646 that his poems first appeared as a collected volume, Men-Miracles. With Other Poemes, in the edition printed in Oxford by Henry Hall. Several poems are overtly dated between 1640 and 1645, and others are shown to belong to that period either by reference to the wars or to the deaths of named persons. Among the latter, however, his Elegie on the death of Sir Horatio Vere could be as early as 1635, and quite possibly some of the humorous verses, lyrics and lines addressed to various ladies (found in the earlier pages of the book) are youthful productions. Certainly his Latin poem Reginarum optima, ignoscas tandem agresti Lucinae addressed to Queen Henrietta Maria, in the Oxford collection Musarum Oxoniensium Charisteria published in 1638 shows already a facility of style and metre, linguistic proficiency and maturity of voice quite equal to other contributions, including those of his friends William Cartwright and Edward Gray in the same volume.

The Laudian ecclesiastic Brian Duppa was Dean of Christ Church until 1638, when he was appointed Lord Bishop of Chichester (1638–1641). Lluelyn's self-deprecatory verses addressed to him "when I presented him a play" ought however to date to 1640, since he says that the plant of his capabilities "was set here foure yeares since". These lines perhaps accompanied Lluelyn's first dramatic effort, as he says, "Who single Leafes before, now heaps hath reard". The companion poem immediately following, addressed to Dr "F" as Dean of Christ Church, upon the same occasion, is to Dr Samuel Fell, Duppa's successor as Dean (1638–1648), also a Laudian, whose son John Fell (1625–1686) was admitted a student in 1637 aged 11 and was Lluelyn's university contemporary. Possibly this play was "presented" only in the sense that it formed a written degree submission, as was done elsewhere: but as he is known to have staged plays on other occasions, that question remains academic. The piece entitled "The Wake" (in the sense of a merry-making vigil) forms a little masque, a series of verses by which a morris dancer and his musicians (Fiddler, Taberer, Bagpiper and Harper) are successively introduced, before joining to perform a loyal song called "The Witney Carol": it is a witty evocation rather than a script for performers.

== Civil War period ==
Graduating BA in June 1640, Lluelyn's three-year term of residency leading to his MA award in May 1643 witnessed the onset of civil hostilities, in which Christ Church itself was soon to become a principal scene of action. If the arrest of Archbishop Laud in December 1640 did not yet prompt Lluelyn to a Lament, his vein for Occasional verses, elegies and satires, increasingly responded to public events as they unfolded. In 1640 he contributed an English poem addressed to the Queen in a volume of Oxford verses celebrating the birth of Prince Henry. His "Elegie on the Death of Sir Henry Spelman" (died October 1641) praised the antiquary for his service to the kingdom by his exposition of its Church history:

"We thank thee that our Churches stand, that We
In one Roofe lodge not with our Deity:
That Parlars are not Temples, that we spare
A Place to sever our Discourse from Prayer:
That not th'Oxe Crown'd and Cook'd on one board lyes:
That 'tis not one to Carve and Sacrifice.

Lluelyn's friend Gray died in July 1642 and was buried in Christ Church Cathedral, Oxford (the College's chapel). Lluelyn declared allegiance to Royalist principles in his Elegie on the death of Sir Bevill Grenvill, who died at the Battle of Lansdowne in July 1643. Grenvill was commemorated in a booklet of elegiac verses by Oxford University scholars, including William Cartwright, published soon afterwards. Lluelyn's contribution was cut down to merely 8 of its 58 lines, serving as end-piece to the Grenvill memorial, but he printed it complete in 1646, describing how Grenvill surveyed the opposing forces in the field:

"The Kingdomes Law is the pretence of each,
Which these by Law preserve, these by its breach:
The Subjects Liberty each side mainetaines,
These say it consists in freedome, these in Chaines:
These love the decent Church, but these not passe
To dresse our Matron by the Geneva Glasse.
These still enshrine their God, but these adore
Him most, at some Arauna's Threshing flore.
Each part defends their King a severall way,
By true Subjection these, by Treasons they.

Lluelyn wrote an elegy for William Cartwright, who died of fever in November 1643, and for Sir John Smith (1616–1644), who had saved the King's Standard at the Battle of Edgehill in 1642: both were buried in the Cathedral. His Elegie on the Most Reverend Father in God, William, Lord Archbishop of Canterbury (who was beheaded in January 1644/45) is a defiant and lengthy declaration of his martyrdom. During the Civil War the King removed from London and made Christ Church, Oxford the base of his operations. Oxford was besieged three times by the Parliamentary forces, in May to June 1644, again in May to June 1645 and finally in April to June 1646, after which the city was surrendered to Parliament. Lluelyn took up arms in the Royalist cause, becoming Captain of the Loyal Company of Scholars, as mentioned in his memorial inscription at High Wycombe. Henry Carey was Colonel of the Regiment of Oxford Scholars from 1644 to 1646. The Company's defence of the city is mentioned in Lluelyn's poem The Spy of the Buttery:

"The West was man'd by th' Loyall Schollers,
Whose Gownes you slave are blacke as Colliers.
They taw'd it faith, their Gunnes would hit,
As sure as they had studied it.
They ramm'd their Bullet, they would ha't in,
Bounce went the Noise, like Greeke and Latine.
And for their Colonell moreover,
It was the valiant Earle of Dover."

During the King's midwinter stays at Oxford in 1643 to 1645 Lluelyn wrote carols ("Divine Poems") which were sung before the king. His New Year (Circumcision) 1643 verses included a feast-day carol sung to His Majesty ("The Bleeding Prince was still the Prince of Peace") and a poem dedicated more privily to the Lord Bishop of Salisbury, whither Brian Duppa had been translated in 1641. Carols by Lluelyn were also sung to the King at Christmas and Epiphany (the Twelfth-day feast) in 1644, and again in 1645.

Publication of the 1646 collection Men-Miracles, with its dedication "To the Most Illustrious James Duke of Yorke" (who spent most of the period 1642 to 1646 in Oxford), came at the end of the city's resistance. His shorter comic pieces, such as the Song against fishing, or his lyrical verses To Celia, might be read without offence. Several of them were sufficiently popular to be included among later collections. However, his many pages of Royalist Satire (including that printed separately in 1645), and the imputation of Treason, directed against the rebels (whatever Posteri, vestra res agitur), rapidly became inconvenient in the hour of the city's capitulation. These included the long 22nd section of the title-poem which, in Hudibrastic vein and metre, borrowed the human grotesques from the tales in Mandeville's Travels and from Thomas Coryat in preparation for his impenetrably absurd culminating narrative. This "ingenious poem", said William Winstanley "came forth into the world with great applause".

The elegy upon the Christ Church scholar John Gregory (died March 1646/47), which appears as An ELEGIE on the Learned AUTOR over the initials "M. LL." as the dedicatory verses to Gregory's posthumous works published 1649 by John Gurgany, was composed too late to appear in Man-Miracles. John Gregory was buried at Christ Church beside William Cartwright. The elegy has the appearance of Lluelyn's best style, the lines of the rhymed couplets constantly developed through antiphonal or answering figures:

"Yet this bright Stock thy Bountie did afford,
As thy Disbursment still, but not thy Hoard:
Not to amuse the Needie, but supplie:
'Twas thy Dominion, not thy Tyrannie.
Hence when I askt thy Torch to light my Waie,
And gain'd som Twilights from Thy Glistering Daie:
Thy Liberal Art the Labyrinth did undo,
With the same Cheer, as I had been thy Clew.
Thy Candid Guidance back the Compass brought,
And call'd Mee Tutor still, for beeing Taught." (lines 77-86)

On 5 May 1646 the last dramatic production in Oxford before the city surrendered was the play, The King found at Southwell, which survived anonymously in a unique copy but is apparently by Lluelyn. On 13 October 1648 Lluelyn was ejected from his Oxford studentship by the Parliamentarian University Visitors, by order of the Committee of Lords and Commons.

== Commonwealth period ==
=== First marriage ===
Having been ejected from the University, Lluelyn then removed to London where he practised as a physician. Release from academical status freed him to marry, and in around 1649/50 he took to wife Lettice (née Carrill), a widow with three young children, whose guardian he became. Their father Isaack Tully, a London silk merchant, citizen and Mercer, had died in 1648 leaving to Lettice and to her sister Frances Carrill's husband Roger Heath of Shalford, Surrey (died 1661) the execution and oversight of his will, but with an impediment. Isaack's father William Tulley, Warden (1632, 1634) and Master (1635–36) of the Merchant Taylors of London, had died in 1639 leaving a proportion of his £20,000 estate to be distributed among his children according to London custom, but the executor had not paid the legacies. Hence Isaack's portion, now owing to Lettice, was still needed for the due performance of Isaack's will, but was not forthcoming. As the second husband of Lettice, Lluelyn stepped squarely into the midst of Chancery litigation which, despite a favourable final decree in 1655, persisted until at least 1659, the year in which Lettice died.

=== Doctor of Physick ===
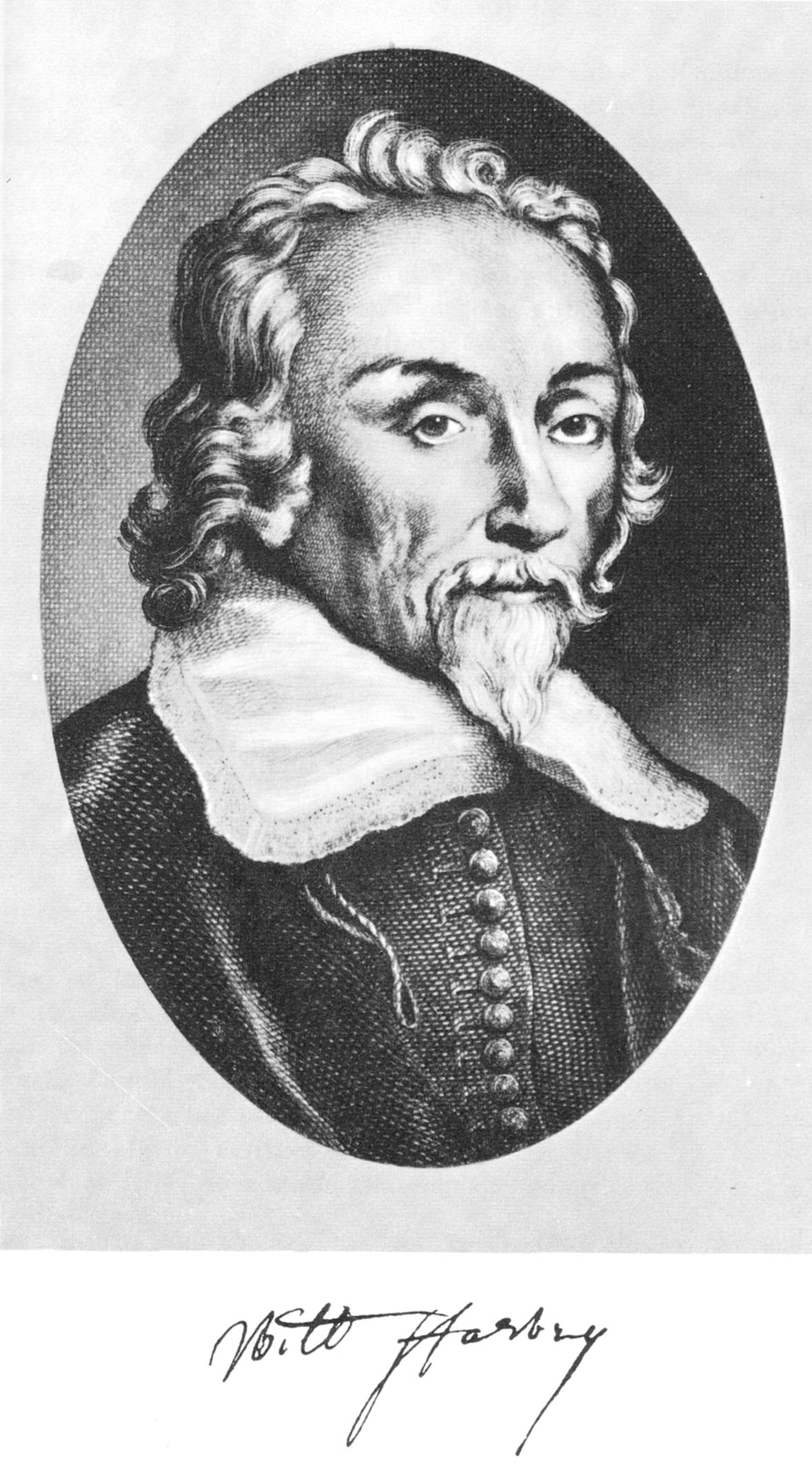
Dr William Harvey (1578–1657), whose De Generatione Animalium (English edition, 1656) was introduced by Lluelyn's verses

By 1652 Lluelyn had two children by Lettice, a daughter Lettice and son Martin, who was born in 1652: the daughter, named first in their father's memorial inscription, was perhaps the elder. Anthony à Wood described his medical progress as follows: "In 1653 he obtained the favour of the men in power, then in the university, to be admitted doctor of physic, and so consequently took the oaths that were then required, and afterwards became fellow of the College of Physicians." That is to say, the university awarded him the degree of Doctor of Medicine on 15 July 1653, and he then had to take certain oaths of conformity to the prevailing authorities before being admitted a Candidate to the Royal College of Physicians on 24 September 1653.

Martin's father's long service at St Bartholomew's Hospital no doubt told in his favour, and, more particularly, his family's long acquaintance with Dr William Harvey, who had assisted the elder Llewellin in the repayment of a debt to John Harvey of over £50 many years previously. In 1653 this connection was powerfully renewed in the English edition (from the Latin) of Harvey's De Generatione Animalium. The text is prefaced by a long verse encomium by Lluelyn, To the incomparable Dr. Harvey, On his Books of the Motion of the Heart and Blood, and of the Generation of Animals. Joseph Needham followed Robert Willis in accepting Lluelyn's authorship of the entire translation, Needham calling it "the beautiful 17th century English into which Harvey's Latin was translated under his guidance by the physician Martin Llewellyn": howbeit in another place, quoting from the verses, he acknowledged Sir Geoffrey Keynes's comment that the translation itself had no definitive attribution. Even were Lluelyn not the translator, the choice of his encomium to introduce such a work was an outstanding recognition, at a time when the College itself was raising a statue to Harvey as the most distinguished anatomist and physician of his age.

In the following year appeared the first (Latin) edition of Christopher Bennet's work on tuberculosis, the Theatri Tabidorum Vestibulum: to this four Latin verse encomia are contributed. The fourth, by Lluelyn, Medicorum Sagacissime, Cujus Vestibulum plura Quam aliorum Ædes, & Prædia continet, is by far the most polished and literary of them, and for once is signed off in his own name, as "Mart. Lluellin. M.D. Col. Lond." (rather than the usual initials), as if gaining confidence at being publicly known. It was the only lifetime edition, as Bennet died in April 1655; but in a revised Latin edition of 1656 (re-published in Leyden, Netherlands, in 1714) Lluellin adds a note to the reader (Lectori) stating that he has undertaken the revision with Bennet's agreement. The verses and Notice to the reader were removed for the first English (translated) edition, of 1720, and the new Preface comments:"...such Recommendations being out of the Relish of the present Times, is the Reason why they are not translated now. In an Epistle to the Reader prefixed to this WORK by Dr. Luellen, who it seems had the Revisal and Publication of it, it appears that the Author [i.e. Bennet] was careless enough of his Stile... whoever has read the Latin Edition, which hath been long so scarce as to be known but to few, will find a strange Perplexity and Difficulty arising from such Neglect, as well as from that peculiar Affectation of Expression as was familiar to the Time in which the Author wrote."

1656 also saw the second (first London) edition of Men-Miracles. With Other Poemes, which retained all the original content of the 1646 edition, partly re-set to suit the page-format. The authorship was still given as "M. Ll. St. of Ch. Ch. in Oxon." on the title-page, since parts of the content might still be thought inflammatory: but some comic verses were chosen by Sir John Mennes for inclusion, anonymously, in his Facetiæ: Musarum Deliciæ, a 1656 update of a 1640 collection called Wit's Recreations. The little masque called The Wake was included, with woodcut vignettes, and a short piece called Cock-throwing.

On 27 May 1659 he was elected a Fellow of the College of Physicians. In August 1659 his wife Lettice made her will (as of St Botolph's, Aldersgate), appointing her husband Martin Lewellin (Doctor in Physick) her sole executor, mentioning her brother-in-law Roger Heath and his wife Frances, and making bequests of textiles and jewellery to her daughters Hannah Tullie and Lettice Lewellin. Having done so, she died before the year's end and her husband proved the will by his oath on 16 December 1659.

== Restoration ==
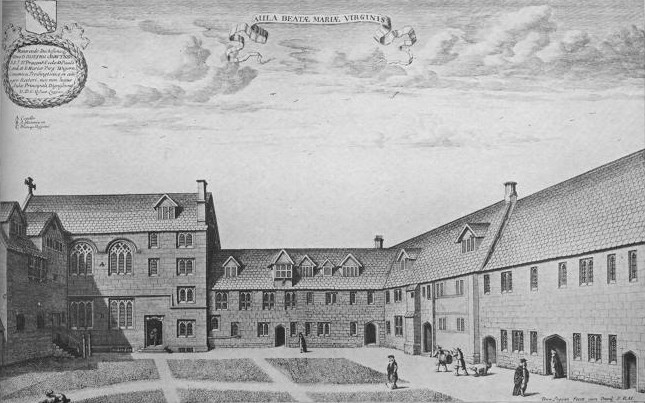
St Mary Hall in 1675, where Lluelyn was Principal 1660–1664

The Stuart monarchy was restored in May 1660 with the return of King Charles II. Lluelyn (subscribing as "Coll. Lond. socius") published three celebratory poems, addressed To the Kings Most Excellent Majesty, To His Highnesse the Duke of Yorke, and To His Highnesse the Duke of Glocester, in honour of the event. On 21 June 1660 Lluelyn was admitted Principal of St Mary Hall, Oxford (a college now assimilated into Oriel College) in the place of Thomas Cole, who was ejected by the King's Commissioners as nonconforming. He and Cole (who had been appointed in 1656) were the first two Principals of that Hall that had not previously belonged to Oriel College, with which St Mary Hall was closely associated. On 31 July 1660 the King appointed him one of the Visitors, or Commissioners, for the regulation of the university.

In the same year he was appointed a sworn Physician Extraordinary to King Charles. He attached this distinction to his authorial name when publishing a further Occasional poem following the death of Henry Stuart, Duke of Gloucester on 13 September 1660. He remarked that disease had completed Cromwell's work: who, though he had bathed his black soul in royal blood, still had feared to murder youthful innocence.

In early July 1661 a performance of one of Lluelyn's plays was contemplated for the reception of the King during his visit to the University. According to a letter written from Queen's College, the reception arrangements were entrusted to the Dean of Salisbury (Richard Baylie) and five others. However, the promoters were so in want of actors, that they feared being obliged to make use of the Red Bull players, based in London but then touring at Oxford. It is doubted whether "Dr. Llewellyn's" play was actually performed on this occasion. However, in the same year his collection Men-Miracles came to its third edition, now overtly under his full name, under the new title The Marrow of the Muses. His Elegy for Sir Bevill Grenville was printed in full in Alexander Brome's 1662 collection Rump.

Now a widower, on 2 August 1662 Lluelyn took as his second wife the 24-year-old Martha Long from Penn, Buckinghamshire: some years later she brought him three further sons and two more daughters. Part of the original fabric of St Mary Hall, including chambers on the east side of the courtyard, was pulled down in 1664. Lluelyn left the University after four years: his successor, Joseph Crowther, D.D., was admitted Principal on 26 December 1664. David Loggan's view of the Hall, from his Oxonia Illustrata, shows it in 1675. He therefore narrowly missed the arrival of the King and Court in Oxford in November 1665, when they left London to escape the Plague.

=== High Wycombe ===
In 1664 he moved his residence to High Wycombe in Buckinghamshire (adjacent to Penn), where he resumed practice as a physician. His emergence into civic life was not immediate: he may have interested himself, as his father-in-law George Long did, in the inquiry into commoners' rights on Wycombe Heath during the later 1660s. As his first son Martin (who had a military career) approached majority, the eldest son of his second marriage, George (who became a lifelong Jacobite), was born about 1669. Buckinghamshire had been, and in many ways remained, strongly sympathetic to the cause of the Dissenters, and in particular with the nearby Quaker communities at Jordans and the Chalfonts, associated with Isaac Pennington, William Penn and other early luminaries of the Society of Friends. Lluelyn was, on the contrary, decidedly loyal to the Court and his royal patron, became at once friendly with the Rector Isaac Milles, and maintained a watchful eye over potential fomentors of unrest, whom he considered to be fanatics. He entered formal civic life quite abruptly, being elected Alderman of the Corporation on 9 September 1671 in readiness to qualify as a candidate in the upcoming mayoral election. The opposing party had a clear opinion of him, for one of them was actually disfranchised as a Burgess for saying that he would never vote for Dr Lluelyn as Mayor even if the King commanded him personally to do so.

Lluelyn was elected Mayor of High Wycombe on 28 September 1671, taking the required oaths against the Solemn League and Covenant. On 11 November it was necessary to elect a new Master for the Free Grammar School, and the Mayor and council agreed to pay a pension to the widow of the former Schoolmaster on condition that she did not turn Quaker or otherwise become a Sectary and depart from the liturgy of the Church of England. One of the Overseers for the Poor resisted the imposition of a fine on a man who had allowed a Conventicle to be held in his house, and another Dissenter held the Mayor's officer captive when he arrived to make distraint for having attended it. During Lluelyn's term the 20 cwt bell, no. 5 of the old 6-bell chime, was cast with an inscription naming him as Mayor, together with the churchwardens: this commemoration was however cut short when the bells were re-cast in a set of eight in 1711. What has survived is a scabrous poem entitled Wickham Wakened; or, the Quaker's Madrigall in Rime Doggrel, directed against a Quaker rival in Wycombe in facetious and mocking terms, which Lluelyn published in London during his own mayoralty.

At the end of his term there was held the customary Mayor's Feast at an inn, at which his elected successor died suddenly before leaving. During the mayoralty one of the Members of Parliament for Wycombe, Sir John Borlase, had died, and a considerable rivalry had sprung up between the successor candidates, Sir William Egerton for the Court party, and Sir John Borlase junior for the country. This was soon reflected in local politics, and when the new Mayor died the opposing faction, some of whom were not qualified to vote, elected their own candidate. Lluelyn and others brought a petition against them before the Privy Council, and the King himself attended the hearing and directed that there should be an orderly re-election. A fortnight later, both parties elected their own Mayors with rival supporting aldermen, and both raised fresh petitions. Eventually the opposition Mayor was accepted and Sir John Borlase held the parliamentary seat.

There was apparently still some appetite for Lluelyn's poetic style and conceits, for Man-Miracles appeared in its fourth and final lifetime edition in 1679, Lluellin being now identified in full on the title page. In 1679–1681, Lluelyn served as a JP for the county, "in which office he behaved himself severe against the fanatics". His last great moment was on 24 August 1681 when, on behalf of the Mayor, Aldermen, Bailiffs, Burgesses and other inhabitants of the Corporation, he presented a loyal address to the King. The opening sentences carry some distinctive flourishes:

"Most of our late Defeated Politicians, disappointed of theire dark designments by your Majesties profound wisdome and divine provision, have endeavoured to disparrage all Loyall Addresses, either as useless and insignificant or as discountenanced and unregarded, and that the glutt of them doth Cloy and surfett rather then satisfie your Majestie. Notwithstanding these slye projected discouragements, wee have alwayes detested and reiected them, togeather with their now exploded scanty and foresaken Abettors, And have ever incerted our Loyal Selves amongst the Resolute, grave and deliberate persons; And wee do most highly applaud the stout fidelios, the strenuous brisk and valiant youth of this your now much undeluded nation."

== Death and burial ==
Martin Lluelyn made his will on 16 March 1681/82 leaving all his estate and property between Martha his wife and his six children, Martin, George, Richard, Maurice, Martha and Mary. (As there is no mention of his daughter Lettice, she was presumably dead.) His widow (his executor) was to have lifetime tenure of his dwelling house in Chipping Wycombe, and he mentioned his houses in Fleet Street, and in Hand Alley in Fleet Street, in St Dunstan-in-the-West, City of London. His books were to be distributed among his younger children as and when appropriate. The will was proved on 7 April following.

He died on 17 March 1681/82 and was buried in the north aisle of the chancel of High Wycombe parish church. His grave was covered with a black marble stone inscribed with a Latin epitaph written (after much persuasion) by his friend the Revd. Isaac Milles (1638–1720), vicar of High Wycombe. This is mentioned in Milles's Life, where it is written, "there was none that he kept a fairer and more intimate Correspondence with, than with an eminent and very learned Physitian, Dr Martin LLuellyn, who lived in Wiccomb all the time Mr Milles was Vicar of it... He was a Man of singular Integrity of Life and Manners, and of the most comely and decent Gravity and Deportment..." When Milles left Wycombe in 1681, "with none did Mr. Milles part with more Reluctancy, or was parted with, with greater Regret, than with Dr. LLuellyn and his family, from whom Mr. Milles had found all the Friendship and Respect that he could expect."

=== Arms ===
The tombstone also exhibited a coat of arms featuring a lion rampant crowned (for Lluellyn), impaling a lion rampant inter 8 croslets, ... within a bordure ermine. (Note that John Aubrey described the distaff or sinister impaled coat as showing a hand in the lion's mouth.) The arms of the Lluellyn family of South Witham, Lincolnshire, are given in Burke's Armory as Argent, a lion rampant sable ducally crowned or, with the crest On a rock proper a Cornish chough also proper. (Burke associates the date 1654). This is the same crest which appears surmounting similar arms on the tomb of Henry Lluellyn the almshouse-patron of Wells in 1614 (image above). The pedigree of Halford of South Witham, Lincolnshire shows that Martin Lluellyn (eldest son of Dr Martin Lluellyn) married Elizabeth daughter and coheir of Charles Halford not before 1675; the South Witham inheritance came from her mother's side, the Michell family. Upon these statements, the family of Dr Lluellyn bore these arms prior to the marriage by which his senior descendants became settled at South Witham. The arms in this way provide supporting evidence that the family of Dr Lluellyn was, during the seventeenth century, thought to descend from the Lluellyn family of Wells.

== Marriages and children ==
Lluelyn married twice:

- First, c. 1649, to Lettice Carrill (died 1659), daughter of Simon Carrill (died 1619) of Great Tangley, Wonersh, Surrey, and his wife Elizabeth Aungier (died 1650), and relict of Isaack Tully (died 1649), citizen and Mercer of London, by whom he had children:
  - Martin Lluelyn (1652–1729), an officer of horse under King James II, was appointed Commissary-General of the Provisions to the Forces in Portugal by Queen Anne in November 1703. He married Elizabeth, daughter and co-heir of Charles Halford (1623–1676) of Edith Weston, co. Rutland, and his wife Elizabeth Michell (a co-heir of South Witham, Lincolnshire), according to the Lincolnshire Visitations. The M.P. Richard Halford (1662–1742) was his brother-in-law.
  - Laetitia Lluelyn, mentioned in her mother's will of 1659, but probably not living in 1682. Mentioned in her father's monumental inscription, but not in his will.
- Secondly on 5 August 1662 to Martha Long (c1638-1728), daughter of George Long of Penn, Buckinghamshire, by whom he had children:
  - George Lluelyn (c. 1669), was the "Jacobitical, musical, mad Welsh parson" of that name, rector of Condover and Pulverbatch, Shropshire, from 1705, described by Dr Charles Burney (1726–1814), who as a child knew him personally. Page of the Backstairs to Charles II, he was sent to University by James II. George Llewellyn the son of Martin of Agmondesham (Amersham), Bucks (deceased), matriculated from Merton College in 1685 aged 16 and graduated BA in 1690. Taking MA at Christ Church in 1693, he was ordained deacon at Oxford, and priest in 1695, and is recorded as chaplain of Christ Church, Oxford from 7 September 1693 to 11 March 1703. George's character described by Burney is enlarged in a manuscript account made by the Jaundrell family of Pulverbatch: he was a most versatile musician, a friend of Henry Purcell, a collector of paintings, a Tory of strongly Jacobite sympathies, and an extraordinary topiarist.
  - Richard Lluelyn (c. 1674), a King's Scholar at Westminster School in 1687 (aged 13), he was elected to, and matriculated from Christ Church, Oxford in 1690, and was a student at the Inner Temple in 1693. He married twice, the second time to Elizabeth Bromwich of St Martin-in-the-Fields on 14 February 1715/16.
  - Maurice Lluelyn (?c. 1673), son of Martin Lluelyn, Doctor of Physic of High Wickham (deceased), was bound apprentice for 7 years to the London citizen and Mercer John Shergold, on 24 February 1687/88.
  - Martha Lluelyn (c. 1674), was first married to a husband named Searjant, but was already widowed in 1716 when mentioned in her mother's will. The will was not proved until 1728: Martha remarried to a husband named Cross, under which name she is mentioned in the Jaundrell description of her brother George. She died on 1 February 1767 aged 93, and was buried (as "Martha Cross") at High Wycombe beneath her father's stone, with a short additional inscription.
  - Maria Lluelyn, living 1716, married a husband named Waller who was also living at that date.

== Works ==
Lluelyn wrote various plays, but all his surviving published works are of poetry.

- Reginarum optima, ignoscas tandem agresti Lucinae (poem) in the 1638 Oxford collection Musarum Oxoniensium Charisteria.
- Elegie on the death of Sir Bevile Grenville, as an 8-line poem, appeared first in the 1643 Oxford volume of verses in honour of the Royalist commander Sir Bevil Grenville (died 1643) slain at the Battle of Lansdown. The 58-line version was printed in Men-Miracles in 1646. In the London reprint of the Oxford Verses of 1684 only the final 8 lines of the poem appeared (p. 16), but the full elegy also appeared in Alexander Brome's 1662 collection Rump. The short form of the poem is inscribed on Grenville's mural monument erected in 1714 at Kilkhampton, Cornwall.
- Men-Miracles, with other Poems ("By M. Ll. St. of Christ Church in Oxon") (1646), a volume of his poems, was reprinted in 1656, in 1661 and in 1679, (sometimes titled "Lluellin's Marrow of the Muses"). Prefixed are commendatory verses by Edward Gray, William Cartwright and others.
- To the incomparable Dr. Harvey, On his Books of the Motion of the Heart and Blood, and of the Generation of Animals, Prefatory verses (by "M. LL. M. D.") to William Harvey's Anatomical Exercitations (1653).
- Elogium ad auctorem, prefatory to Christopher Bennet's Theatri Tabidorum Vestibulum (1656).
- Verses on the Return of King Charles II, James, Duke of York, and Henry, Duke of Gloucester (London, 1660, folio)
- Elegy on the Death of Henry, Duke of Gloucester (London, 1660, folio)
- Wickham Wakened; or, the Quaker's Madrigall in Rime Doggrel (1672, quarto), a diatribe against a rival practitioner of Wycombe, who was a Quaker.

There is a copy of verses by him prefixed to Cartwright's Plays and Poems (1651).

== Sources ==
- National Library of Wales, Dictionary of Welsh Biography, LLUELYN (or LLEWELLIN ), MARTIN ( 1616–1682 )
- Dictionary of National Biography, 1885–1900, Volume 33, Lluelyn, Martin, by Thomas Seccombe (quoted verbatim in parts, out of copyright)
