= Jeremiah Milles =

English antiquarian (1714–1784)

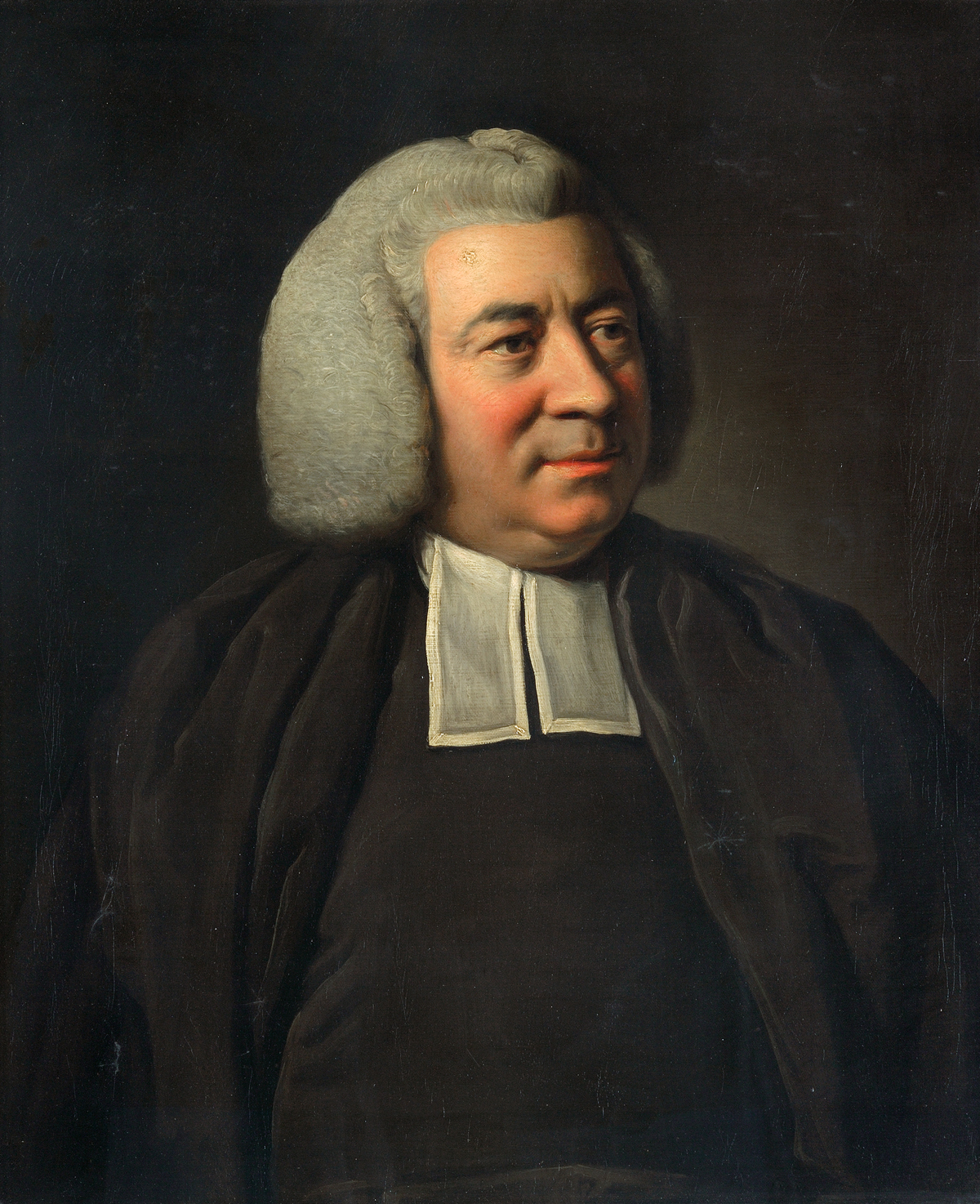
Portrait of Milles, c. 1765 – 1780, attributed to Nathaniel Dance-Holland, collection of the Society of Antiquaries (Note: This portrait was donated to the Society of Antiquaries in 1883 by Major General Thomas Milles. The Society also possesses a copy by Mary Black, commissioned by the Earl of Leicester, FSA (later Marquess Townshend), 1787.)

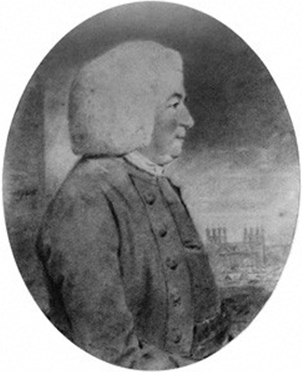
Jeremiah Milles as Dean of Exeter, with Exeter Cathedral in the background: watercolour portrait by John Downman, 1785

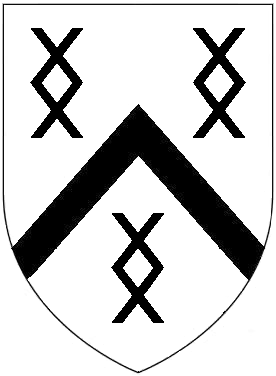
Canting arms of Milles of Cockfield, Suffolk: Argent, a chevron between three millrinds sable. Visible in the portrait by George Vertue of Rev. Isaac Milles (1638–1720), Vicar of Highclere; and on the hatchment of Jeremiah Milles (d. 1797) in Sawbridgeworth church, Hertfordshire.

Rev. Jeremiah Milles FSA (1714–1784) was President of the Society of Antiquaries and Dean of Exeter between 1762 and 1784. He carried out much internal renovation in Exeter Cathedral. As part of his antiquarian research into the history of the parishes of Devon he pioneered the use of the research questionnaire, which resulted in the "Dean Milles' Questionnaire", which survives as a valuable source of historical information.

== Origins ==
Jeremiah Milles' father was Rev. Jeremiah Milles (1675–1746), who was a fellow and tutor at Balliol College, Oxford from 1696 to 1705; became Rector of Riseholm, Lincolnshire in 1704; and was rector of Duloe, Cornwall for 42 years from 1704 until his death. The elder Jeremiah was the son of Rev. Isaac Milles (1638–1720) (youngest son of Thomas Milles of Carrington's Farm, Cockfield, Suffolk.), vicar of Highclere, Hampshire, who was considered the model parish priest of his age – there is a monument to him in Highclere Church. Isaac Milles' eldest son was Thomas Milles (1671–1740), Church of Ireland Bishop of Waterford and Lismore. Jeremiah Milles was his nephew and heir.

== Youth ==
Milles was educated at Eton College and matriculated in 1729 as a gentleman-commoner at Corpus Christi College, Oxford (BA 1733, MA 1735, BD and DD 1747). In 1733 he went on his first grand tour of Europe visiting France and Italy with his cousin, the Rev. Dr. Richard Pococke, anthropologist, travel writer and diarist, later Bishop of Ossory and Meath. The two returned from their travels in 1734 earlier than planned to allow Milles to take up Holy Orders and to assume the position of Treasurer of Lismore Cathedral, in the Diocese of their mutual uncle, Thomas Milles, Bishop of Waterford and Lismore.

Two years later Rev. Milles and Dr. Pococke set out on their second grand tour, this time visiting the Low Countries, Germany, Austria, Poland and Hungary. Milles returned alone in 1737 to attend the bishop, who was suffering from "the Gravel" (gallstones), leaving his cousin to continue his voyage to the East. Detailed accounts of their travels survive in a large collection of letters to Bishop Milles and Mrs. Pococke, as well as in a number of note-books, all in the British Library. Pococke published his travels in his pioneering book, A Description of the East (1743 and 1745), and the correspondence of the two cousins was published in 2011 as Letters from Abroad: The Grand Tour Correspondence of Richard Pococke & Jeremiah Milles. (Note: Letters from Abroad: The Grand Tour Correspondence of Richard Pococke & Jeremiah Milles. Volume 1, Letters from the Continent (1733–34); Volume 2, Letters from the Continent (1736–37); Volume 3, Letters from the East (1737–41). Finnegan, Rachel (Ed.). Published by Pococke Press (2011, 2012 and 2013 respectively).)

== Career ==
Milles became Precentor of Exeter in 1747 and in June 1762 Dean of Exeter, in succession to Dr Charles Lyttelton (1714–1768), who had been elected in 1762 Bishop of Carlisle. Lyttelton was President of the Society of Antiquaries, and had started a period of renovation of the fabric of Exeter Cathedral. Milles continued the work with great vigour. He succeeded Lyttelton also as President of the Society of Antiquaries from 1768 until his death on 13 February 1784.

Milles completed the renovation of the choir and presbytery planned by his predecessor, and laid new paving in the choir and fitted new wainscotting and choir stalls. These were later removed by Sir Gilbert Scott, and parts remain in the Deanery. In 1763 Milles removed the grave-stones of former bishops and canons from the floor of the choir and replaced them scattered throughout the aisles to replace worn paving. He was careful to be present when workmen lifted the slabs but nevertheless did not observe one of them slipping into his pocket a sapphire ring found in a coffin. The sharp-eyed bell-toller informed him of the theft and Milles wrote to Lyttleton about the incident: "The workmen I daresay took me for a conjuror for I told them there was a ring taken out of the grave, that they must produce it, and the guilty person immediately drew it out of his pocket". It is now in the collection of the Cathedral Library.

His next project was the re-glazing of the great west window with armorial glass made by William Peckitt of York between 1764 and 1767. The glass was removed in 1904 but some was replaced in the windows of the cloister room in 1922. He ordered much cleaning, colouring, gilding and varnishing in the 1770s and painted the magnificent Bishop's Throne in 1777. He donated three velvet cushions and a new Bible and Book of Common Prayer for use at the altar. In 1772 he had most of the old church plate melted down and re-made, but spared a pair of 1629 flagons and 1693 candlesticks from his renovation. In 1777 he added new pews to the nave to cater for the growing congregations. He was succeeded by Dean Buller.

== Parochial Questionnaire ==
In 1753 when still a prebendary of Exeter he sent out a questionnaire to all parishes of the diocese of Exeter, in Devon, generally known as "Dean Milles' Questionnaire" or "Dean Milles' Parochial Questionnaire", the returns to which formed the basis for his "Parochial Collections for Devon" or "A Parochial History of Devon", compiled in 1755, but never published by him as a book as he had intended. The 120 numbered questions on two folio sheets were very detailed and varied, and concerned the history of the parish and manors within it, the armorials of the leading families, the geology, archaeological remains, colleges, hospitals, agriculture, etc. 15 questions concerned the parish church itself, including descriptions of ancient monuments. The answers were generally supplied by the parish priest or occasionally by the schoolmaster, as for example at Pilton. The 263 returns he received, equating to a 57% response, he bound together with his annotations on each parish into five volumes arranged alphabetically by parish and these form valuable historical records.

Milles' manuscripts were purchased by the Bodleian Library at Sotheby's in 1843 for £90. The original bound returns are in the Bodleian Library, catalogued as "MSS. Top. Devon b. 1–7, c. 6, c. 8–17, c. 19, e. 7–8, Title: Milles Devonshire Manuscripts". (Note: Milles' notes based upon the replies are catalogued as "MS Top. Devon c.8–12".) A microfilm copy of the returned questionnaires and a second series of "parochial collections" is in the Devon Heritage Centre in Exeter.

== Marriage and issue ==
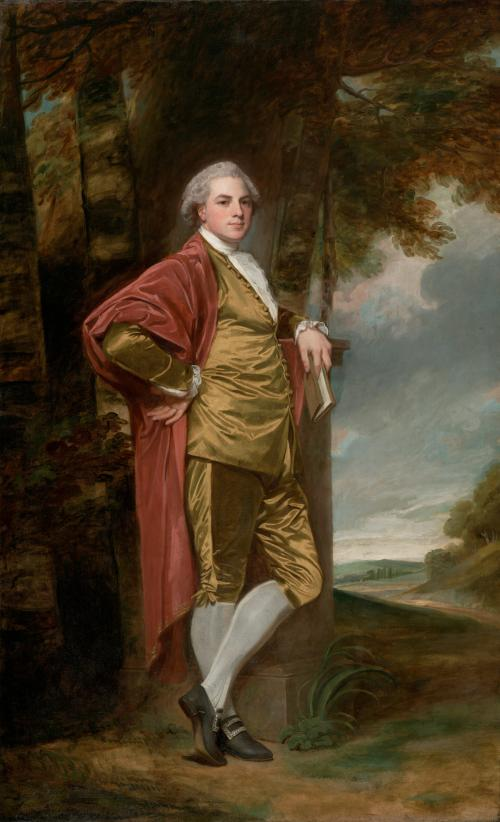
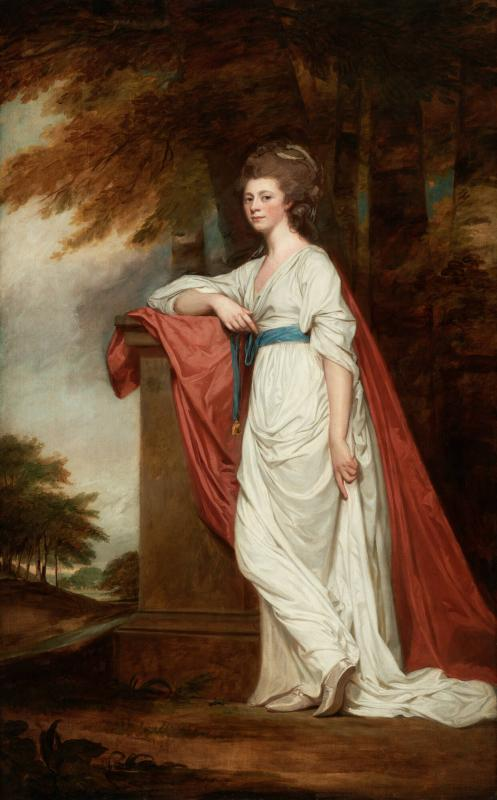
Matching portraits of Milles' son, Jeremiah Milles (1751–1797) and his wife Rose Gardiner (1757–1835), heiress of Pishiobury, Hertfordshire, painted by George Romney c. 1780–83

On 29 May 1745 he married Edith Potter, youngest daughter of John Potter (c.1674–1747) Archbishop of Canterbury (1737–1747). They had progeny including:

- Jeremiah III Milles (1751–1797), DL and Sheriff of Hertfordshire (1786), who married Rose Gardiner (1757–1835) (whose memorial tablet exists in St Mary's Church, Sawbridgeworth), daughter and heiress of Edward Gardiner (d.1779) of Pishiobury House, Sawbridgeworth, Hertfordshire. Jeremiah III Milles rebuilt the house in 1782–84 to the designs of James Wyatt, and it was illustrated in Neale's Views of Seats His white marble mural monument by John Ternouth of Pimlico (1795 - 1849), showing a Grecian-style female figure in mourning, together with his funeral hatchment with inescutcheon of pretence showing the arms of Gardiner Or, a chevron gules between three griffin's heads erased azure langued gules, exists in St Mary's Church, Sawbridgeworth. A pair of portraits of the couple painted c. 1780–83 by George Romney exists in the collection of the Huntington Library Art Gallery, California. Their only son Thomas Gardiner Milles died an infant in 1786 and their sole heiress became their daughter Rose Milles (d.1824) who in 1810 married Rowland Alston (b.1782), MP for Hertfordshire 1835-41, 2nd son of Thomas Alston (d.1823) of Odell Castle, Bedfordshire, nephew and heir of Sir Rowland Alston, 6th Baronet (d.1790).

== Legacy ==
Milles was a pioneer of the circulated questionnaire, and until the end of the eighteenth century was the most successful user of the technique as a research tool. Milles had been a fellow of the Society of Antiquaries in London since 1741, and it was possibly from his example that James Theobald, the Society's president, proposed the production by the Society of its own questionnaire on natural and civil history "Whereby such gentlemen of learning and industry as should be disposed to promote usefull and entertaining researches of those kinds, might be directed in their choice of materials, and the Society reap the fruits of their labours and knowledge". In June 1754 he read out at the Society a pamphlet entitled "Queries Proposed to Gentlemen in the Several Parts of Great Britain, In hope of obtaining, from their Answers, a better Knowledge of its Antiquities and Natural History".

== Notes ==
Church of England titles
| Preceded by Charles Lyttelton | Dean of Exeter; 1762–1784 | Succeeded by William Buller |
