= Richard Pococke =

English clergyman and writer (1704–1765)

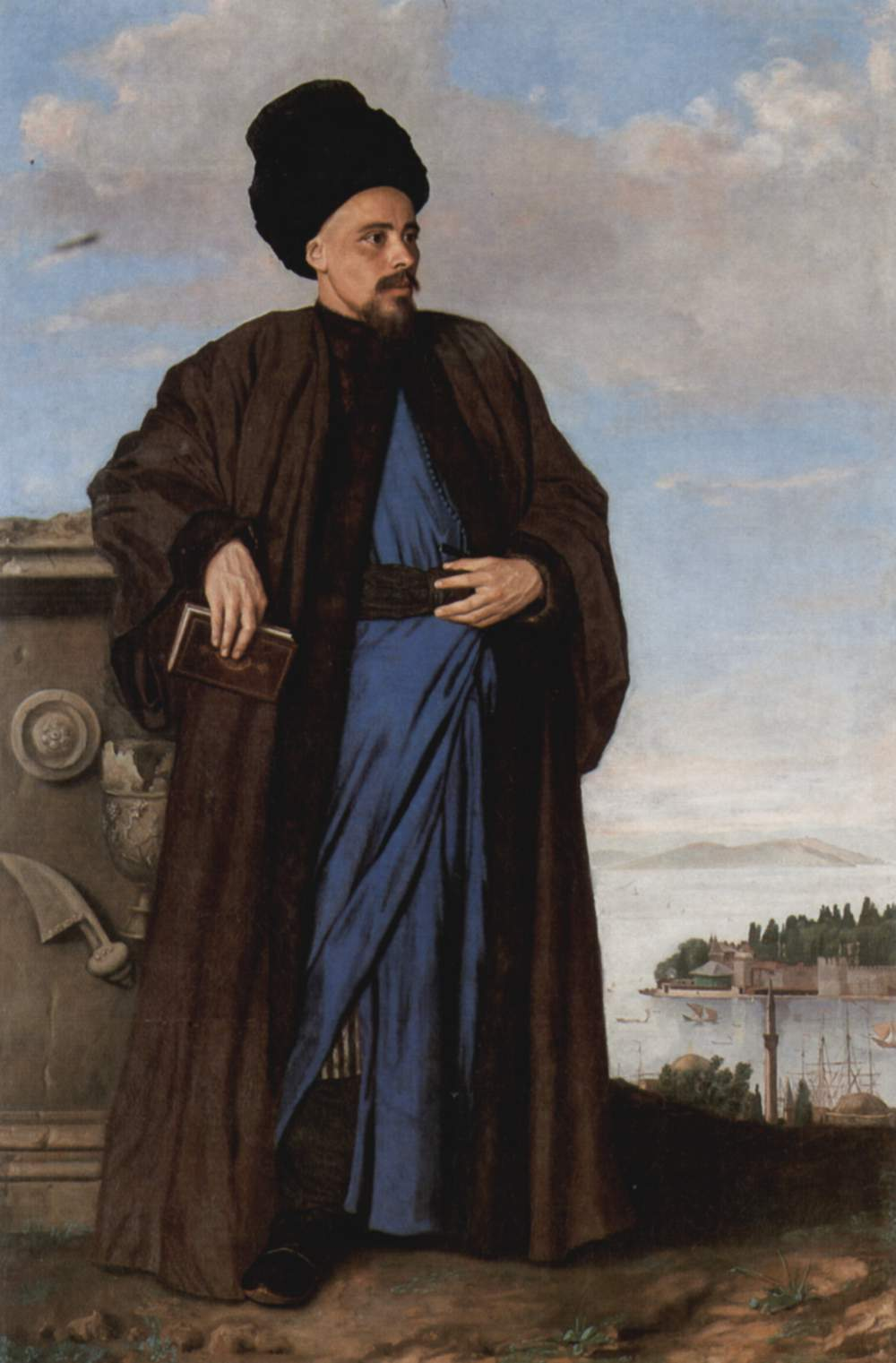
- 1738 portrait of Pococke by Jean-Étienne Liotard
- Born: 19 November 1704; Southampton, England
- Died: 25 September 1765 (aged 60); Charleville Castle, near Tullamore, Ireland
- Citizenship: British subject
- Writing career
- Genres: Travel writer and diarist

Richard Pococke (19 November 1704 – 25 September 1765) was an English clergyman and writer. He was the Bishop of Ossory (1756–65) and Meath (1765), both dioceses of the Church of Ireland. However, he is best known for his travel writings and diaries.

== Early life ==
Pococke was born in 1704 in Southampton, into a family of Church of England clergymen. His father was the Reverend Richard Pococke, and his mother, born Elizabeth Milles, or Mills, was a daughter of Rev. Isaac Milles the younger, the son of Rev. Isaac Milles (1638–1720). His parents had been married on 26 April 1698. Pococke’s paternal grandfather was also a priest, and one of his uncles was Thomas Milles, Regius Professor of Greek at Oxford, soon to become Bishop of Waterford and Lismore in Ireland. He was also distantly related to Edward Pococke, the English Orientalist and biblical scholar. Jeremiah Milles (1714–1784) was a first cousin.

Pococke was educated at Corpus Christi College, Oxford, receiving a Bachelor of Law degree, and was ordained in 1725.

== Travels in Europe (1733–34) and the Near East (1737–40) ==
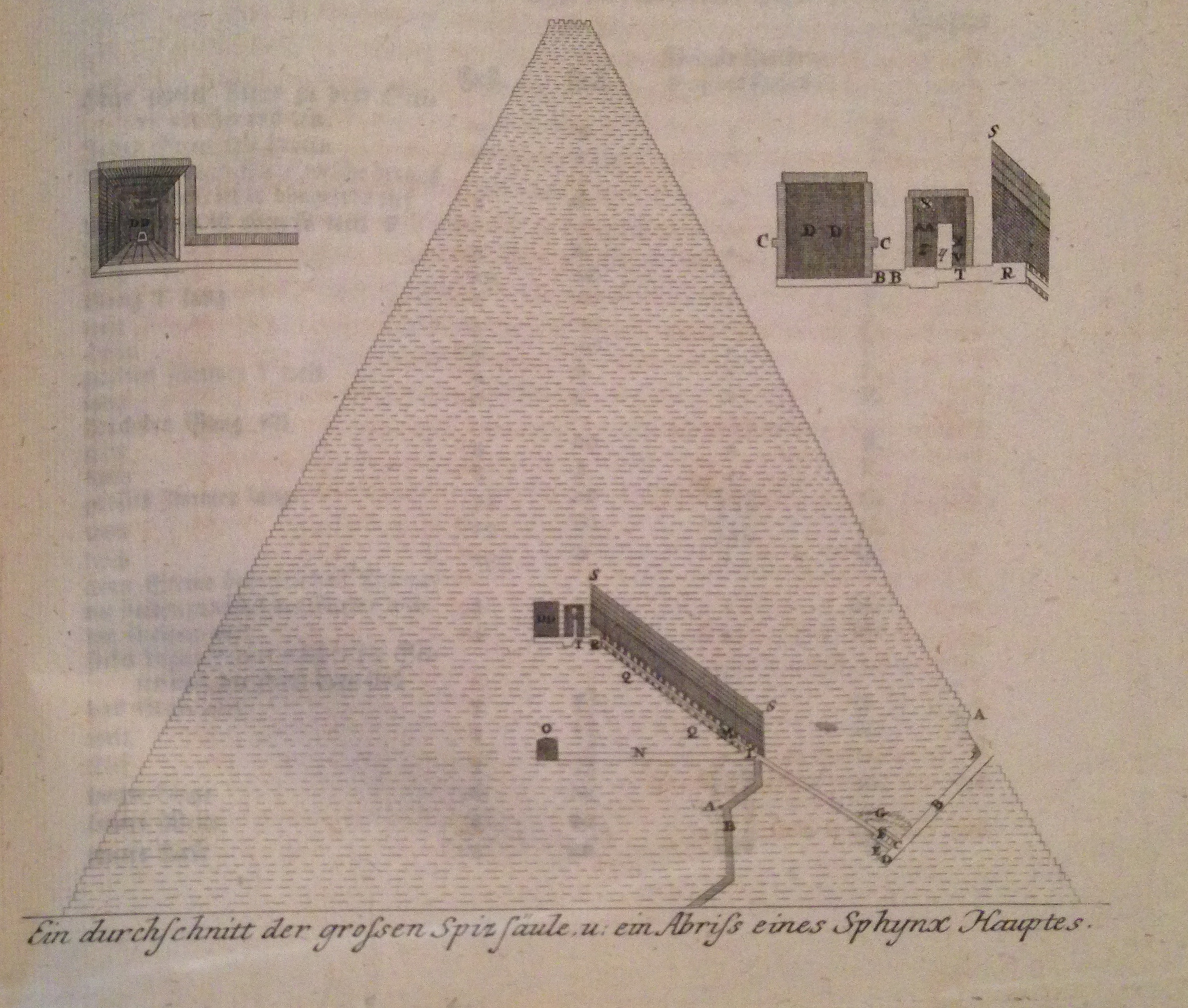
Richard Pococke's sketch of Pyramid of Cheops from 1754.

Between 1733 and 1741, Pococke undertook two Grand Tours with his cousin, Jeremiah Milles. The first (1733–34) was to France and Italy and the second (1737) was to various European countries, then again to Italy. Milles was recalled in 1737 to attend his uncle, the Bishop of Waterford & Lismore, leaving Pococke to continue his major excursion to the Middle East. He returned via Italy in 1741, visiting the Alps on his way back to England by 1742. He was considered one of the first Alpine travellers.

Detailed accounts of his travels survive in a collection of letters written to Pococke's mother and their mutual uncle, the Bishop, as well as in a number of note-books (British Library, Add. Ms. 19939, 15779, 22998, etc.). The earlier manuscripts, recently edited and published by Rachel Finnegan, include probably the most detailed description of Venice's "Marriage to the Sea" ceremony as well as precious information on contemporary music, especially opera. Pococke was a prolific library tourist and visited libraries in Amsterdam, Vienna, and Mount Sinai.

From 1737 to 1741 he visited the Middle East, visiting Egypt, Palestine, Lebanon & Syria, Asia Minor and Greece. These travels were later published in his Description of the East of 1743 and 1745, works which were praised by Edward Gibbon. The complete collection of correspondence written to his mother from his Eastern voyage is now in print (2013), thus completing the publication of all his known travels. Among other things, he was one of the European travellers to give an account of the origins of the medieval Arabic document, the Achtiname of Muhammad, which claims that Muhammad had personally confirmed a grant of protection and other privileges to the monks of Saint Catherine's Monastery in Egypt.

== Irish tour (1747–60) ==
During the years 1747–60, Pococke made a number of tours around various parts of Ireland. The longest of these tours occurred in 1752, when he travelled to just over half of Ireland's counties. He kept a record of this tour, but did not publish it. It ended up in the library of Trinity College, Dublin. Eventually, in 1891, an edited edition of Pococke's 1752 tour was published by George Thomas Stokes.

== Tours in Scotland (1747, 1750, 1760) ==
Pococke made three tours in Scotland. The first two were quite short, the third in 1760 very extensive taking him as far north as Orkney. The first tour commenced on 27 September 1747 and finished on 26 October of the same year. During that month, he visited Edinburgh, Stirling, Glasgow and Ayr, returning to Ireland via Port Patrick. The second tour was very short, only a few days duration. He crossed from Carlisle on 16 July 1750, visiting Dumfries and Drumlanrig Castle before returning via Carlisle.

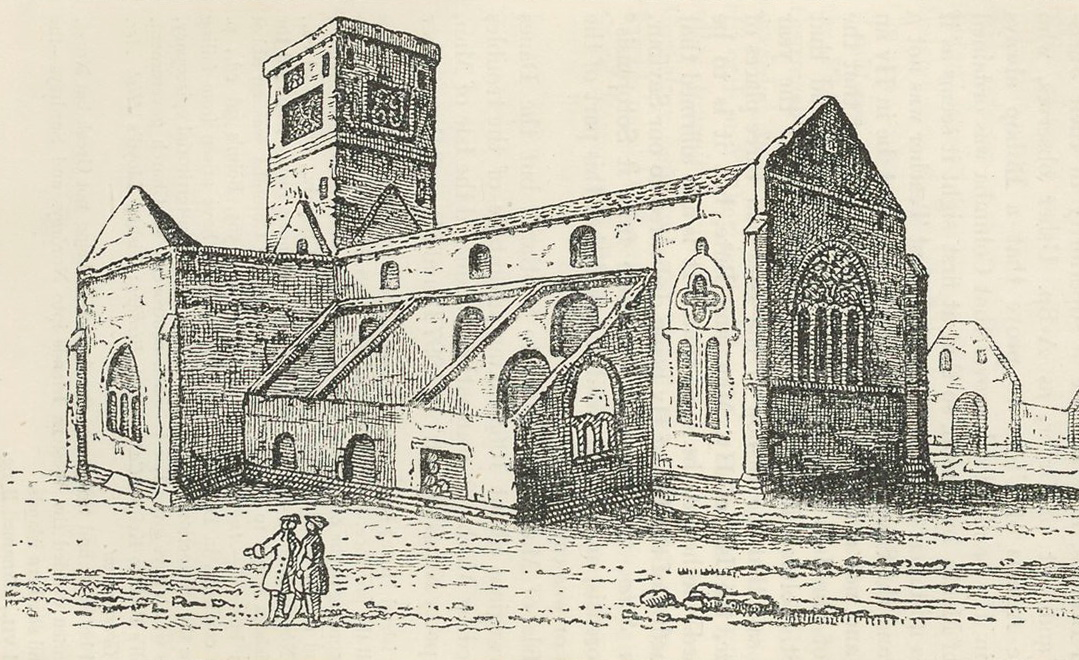
Iona Abbey (or I Colm Kill), drawn by Richard Pococke in 1760, redrafted by G R Primrose for the Scottish History Society Volume One (1887).

The third tour was far more extensive, lasting nearly five months (excepting 8 May to 22 May spent in the north of England). He crossed from Port Patrick on 30 April 1760, returning via Berwick on Tweed on 22 Sept of the same year. His itinerary took him in a clockwise circuit round most of Scotland, including Loch Lomond, Iona, Fort William, Inverness, the North West, Orkney, the North East, Perth, Fife and Edinburgh, finishing at Berwick on Tweed.

In his Tours of Scotland of 1760 he observed marmalade at breakfast "there is always, besides butter and toasted bread, honey and jelly of currants and preserved orange peel".

His travels and observations were recorded in a series of letters to his mother and sister, these letters being subsequently edited by him and transcribed into four manuscript quarto volumes. These were published for the first time by the Scottish History Society in 1887, this being the Society's first Volume.

== Career in the church ==
While known for his travels and travel writing, Pococke also had the reputation of being a conscientious churchman: despite the time he spent travelling, his privileged background and relative wealth, in an age when the Churches of England and Ireland were was under some criticism for their lax ways.

Pococke’s uncle Bishop Milles appointed him to the Precentorship of Lismore. His family connections meant he advanced rapidly in the church. Although he was English, his whole forty-year life of service as a priest was spent in the Church of Ireland, eleven of them as a bishop. He became part of the Anglo-Irish social class.

In 1734, Pococke was appointed Vicar-General of the Dioceses of Waterford and Lismore. The following year, he was made Precentor of Waterford. In 1745, the Lord Lieutenant of Ireland, the Earl of Chesterfield, promoted hi to Archdeacon of Dublin. In 1756, he received an important furrher preferment when he was appointed as Bishop of Ossory. In 1765, having briefly been appointed as Bishop of Elphin, the Bishopric of Meath became vacant and in July Pococke was translated directly from Ossory to Meath; he died three months later.

Pococke enjoyed a reputation as a preacher. On his tours in Scotland, he visited many Episcopal congregations, and preached and confirmed in them all,

‘Bishop Pococke was the only Bishop of the Church of England, since the Revolution, that preached and confirmed in Scotland when Episcopacy was there abolished. For in the summer of 1760, this prelate made a journey from Ireland to the north parts of it... He preached and confirmed in the English Church in Elgin, and continued to do so in every other of that persuasion which he had occasion to be near, greatly regarded and esteemed by all ranks and degrees of people.’

He spent many of his later years in travel throughout Britain and Ireland, publishing accounts of many of his journeys. For example, during early 1751 he toured northeast Lancashire visiting Clitheroe, and Whalley, amongst other places. He died of apoplexy during a visitation at Charleville Castle, near Tullamore, County Offaly, Ireland, in 1765. On his death, many of his manuscripts were given to the recently-established British Museum.

He was buried at Ardbraccan, County Meath, Ireland.

== Works ==
- Works by Richard Pococke in Internet Archive
  A Description of the East and Some other Countries, Vol. I: Observations on Egypt, W. Boyer, London, 1743.
  A Description of the East and Some other Countries, Vol. II, W. Boyer, London, 1745 – divided into two parts:

Part 1, Observations on Palæstina or the Holy Land, Syria, Mesopotamia, Cyprus, and Candia.
Part 2, Observations on the islands of the Archipelago, Asia Minor, Thrace, Greece, and some other parts of Europe.

- Tours in Scotland, 1747, 1750, 1760, Scottish History Society, Edinburgh 1887 (online via National Library of Scotland)
- The Travels through England of Dr. Richard Pococke, successively Bishop of Meath and of Ossory, During 1750, 1751, and Later Years (Camden Society, 1888, vol. 42)

== Mrs Elizabeth Montagu's description ==
In a letter to Mrs. Donnellan dated Sandleford, 30 December 1750, Mrs. Montagu wrote: ... We have a loss in not having Dr. Pococke here this Christmas, as we expected. The conversation of a man of letters, and a traveller, is very agreeable in the country. Now I am out of the sphere of attraction of the great city of London, I am as well pleased to hear of some custom at Constantinople as of a new fashion in London; and the Nile is as much my thought as the Thames...
