= William Cartwright (dramatist) =

17th-century English English poet, playwright, and churchman

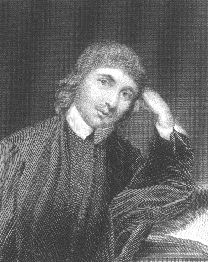
- Born: 1 September 1611; Northway, Gloucestershire
- Died: 29 November 1643 (aged 32)
- Education: Christ Church, Oxford
- Writing career
- Language: English
- Genre: playwright

William Cartwright (1 September 1611 – 29 November 1643) was an English poet, dramatist and churchman.

== Early life ==
Cartwright was born at Northway, Gloucestershire, the son of William Cartwright of Heckhampton, Gloucestershire. He was educated at the free school of Cirencester and at Westminster School. He matriculated from Christ Church, Oxford on 24 February 1632 aged 20, and was awarded BA on 5 June 1632. He was awarded MA on 15 April 1635. Anthony Wood gives an account of his origin as son of a country gentleman turned innkeeper which is contradicted by statements made in David Lloyd's Memoirs.

== Career ==
Cartwright became reader in metaphysics at Oxford University and was, according to Wood, the most florid and seraphical preacher in the university. In 1642 he was made succentor of Salisbury Cathedral, and in 1643 he was chosen junior proctor of the university.

Cartwright was a successor to Ben Jonson and is often counted among the Sons of Ben, the group of dramatists who practised Jonson's style of comedy. The collected edition of his poems (1651) contains commendatory verses by Henry Lawes, who set some of his songs to music, by Izaak Walton, Alexander Brome, Henry Vaughan and others. Cartwright and Lawes maintained an important working relationship, for perhaps a decade prior to Cartwright's death in 1643; in one view, Lawes made a significant contribution to Cartwright's conception of drama.

Though Cartwright has been listed among the 17th century dramatists known as the Sons of Ben, as they were to have been influenced by Ben Jonson, Cartwright's play The Ordinary has been described as a second-rate Jonsonian comedy, nothing more than a pale copy of an original. Some would perhaps argue that bad replication does not qualify Cartwright as a true Son of Ben.

== Civil War ==
Cartwright was nominated one of the council of war at Oxford in 1642. He died of camp fever (epidemic typhus) at Oxford aged 32 and was buried in Christ Church Cathedral. It is said that King Charles I of England wore mourning on the day of his funeral.

== Works ==
His plays are, with the exception of The Ordinary, far-fetched in plot, and stilted and artificial in treatment. They are:

- The Royal Slave (1636), produced by the students of Christ Church before the king and queen, with music by Henry Lawes
- The Lady Errant (acted, 1635–1636; printed, 1651)
- The Siege, or Love's Convert (printed 1651)

In The Ordinary (1635?) he produced a comedy of real life, in imitation of Jonson, representing pot-house society. It is reprinted in Robert Dodsley's Old Plays (ed. William Hazlitt, vol. xii.).
