= Isaac Milles =

English cleric (1638–1720)

- Born: 19 September 1638; Cockfield, Suffolk, England
- Died: 6 July 1720 (aged 81); Highclere, Hampshire, England
- Education: St John's College, Cambridge MA
- Spouse: Elizabeth Luckin
- Children: Thomas Milles, bishop of Waterford; Jeremiah Milles, rector of Riseholm; Isaac Milles, prebendary of Lismore
- Parent: Thomas Milles

Ecclesiastical career
- Church: Church of England
- Ordained: 7 August 1660
- Congregations: Barley, Hertfordshire; Highclere, Hampshire

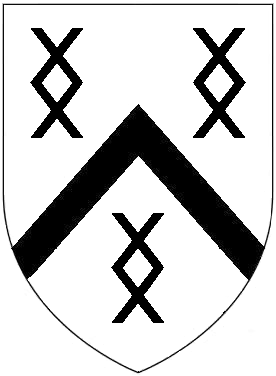
Canting arms of Milles of Cockfield, Suffolk: Argent, a chevron between three millrinds sable. Appears on the portrait of Isaac Milles by George Vertue, and on the funerary hatchment of Jeremiah Milles (d. 1797) in Sawbridgeworth church, Hertfordshire.

Isaac Milles (19 September 1638 – 6 July 1720) was an English cleric, often described as the model parish priest of that day.

== Origins ==
Milles was born on 19 September 1638, the youngest son of Thomas Milles, esq., "a plain country gentleman" of Carrington's Farm, Cockfield, near Bury, Suffolk. He was born and baptised 30 September 1638. The family were however distinguished enough to bear arms, which were: Argent, a chevron between three millrinds sable, with motto "Pietate et Prudentia". These arms are visible on the engraving of Isaac Milles by George Vertue in the British Museum. Of his elder brothers, Samuel, of Queens' College, Cambridge, was a vicar of Royston, Hertfordshire, and John ‘a very considerable tradesman’ at Dedham, Essex.

== Education ==
After spending seven years at King Edward VI School. Bury, where Lord-keeper North was among his schoolfellows, Isaac was admitted at St John's College, Cambridge, in 1656, and graduated M.A. in 1663. His tutor at Cambridge was Francis Turner, afterwards the nonjuring bishop of Ely, who was his lifelong friend.

== Career ==
On leaving the university Milles took holy orders, and became curate in sole charge of Barley, Hertfordshire, the rector, Joseph Beaumont, master of Peterhouse, Cambridge, being non-resident. In 1674, by the influence of his friend Chief Baron Atkins, he obtained the vicarage. There he made the acquaintance of Henry Dodwell, and became intimate with Martin Lluelyn, whose epitaph in Wycombe Church he wrote.

While at Cambridge he had met Edward Colman, Titus Oates’s victim, and seems to have read Colman’s letters to Père la Chaise before they were printed. He came to the conclusion that no popish plot existed, and gave offence by expressing his conviction to that effect in his sermons. It was only the reputation which his high character had won for him which save him from prosecution.

In 1680, he was presented by Sir Robert Sawyer to the living of Highclere, Hampshire, where he remained till his death. Milles took pupils there, including the sons of Thomas Herbert, eighth earl of Pembroke, the new proprietor of Highclere. Chief among his friends at this period were George Hooper, incumbent of East Woodhay and Ashmandsworth, afterwards bishop of St Asaph and of Bath and Wells, and his successor at Woodhay, John Hern, canon of Windsor. For some time he had scruples taking the oath of allegiance after the revolution, Turner the nonjuror appears to have persuaded him to do so.

Milles, a strong tory and high churchman, was a model parish priest. The parish register of Highclere describes him as ‘for 39 years 2 months and 7 days the constant resident rector and pastor of this parish,’ and records his ‘primitive integrity and piety’ and his charity to the poor. ‘He never refused any of his neighbours that desired to borrow any money of him, leaving it to them to take their own time to repay it, without usury.’ He laid out between 400l. and 500l. on the parsonage house and outhouses but ‘never exacted the utmost of his tithes.’

== Marriage and children ==
Milles married in 1670 Elizabeth Luckin (died 1708) of Springfield, Essex, who died of smallpox on 4 January 1708. They had children including:

- Thomas Milles, eldest son, Bishop of Waterford.
- Jeremiah Milles (1675–1746), fellow and tutor at Balliol College, Oxford, from 1696 to 1705, became rector of Riseholm, Lincolnshire, in 1704, and was rector of Duloe, Cornwall, from 1704 until his death. His son was Jeremiah Milles (1714–1784), Dean of Exeter and antiquary.
- Isaac Milles the younger (fl. 1701-1727), B.A. of Balliol College 1696, graduated M.A. from Sidney Sussex, Cambridge, in 1701, was treasurer of the diocese of Waterford 21 May 1714, and prebendary of Lismore 6 September 1716, but was non-resident, and carried on his father’s school at Highclere. In 1727 he resigned his Irish benefices to become rector of Ludshelfe or Litchfield, Hampshire.
  - Richard Pococke, Bishop of Meath, was a grandson.

== Death and burial ==
He died of paralysis on 6 July 1720, and was buried on 9 July in the chancel of Highclere Church, where a black marble slab with a Latin inscription was put up to his memory by his children. A white marble monument with inscription was also placed by his eldest son on the north wall of the chancel. Bromley mentions a rare engraved portrait of him, signed by George Vertue.

== Sources ==
- The Quaint Life of Isaac Milles (1721)), was written by or under the influence of Bishop Thomas Milles. With it is printed a funeral sermon by J. W., a neighbouring clergyman. In 1842 a duodecimo edition of the Life, summarised, and containing preface and some additional matter, with three illustrations, was published.
- H. Cotton, Fasti Ecclesiae Hibernicae. 6 vols. Dublin, 1851-78.

Attribution

This article incorporates text from a publication now in the public domain: Norgate, Gerald le Grys (1894). "Milles, Isaac". Dictionary of National Biography. Vol. 37. p. 432.
