= Abraham Cowley =

17th-century English writer

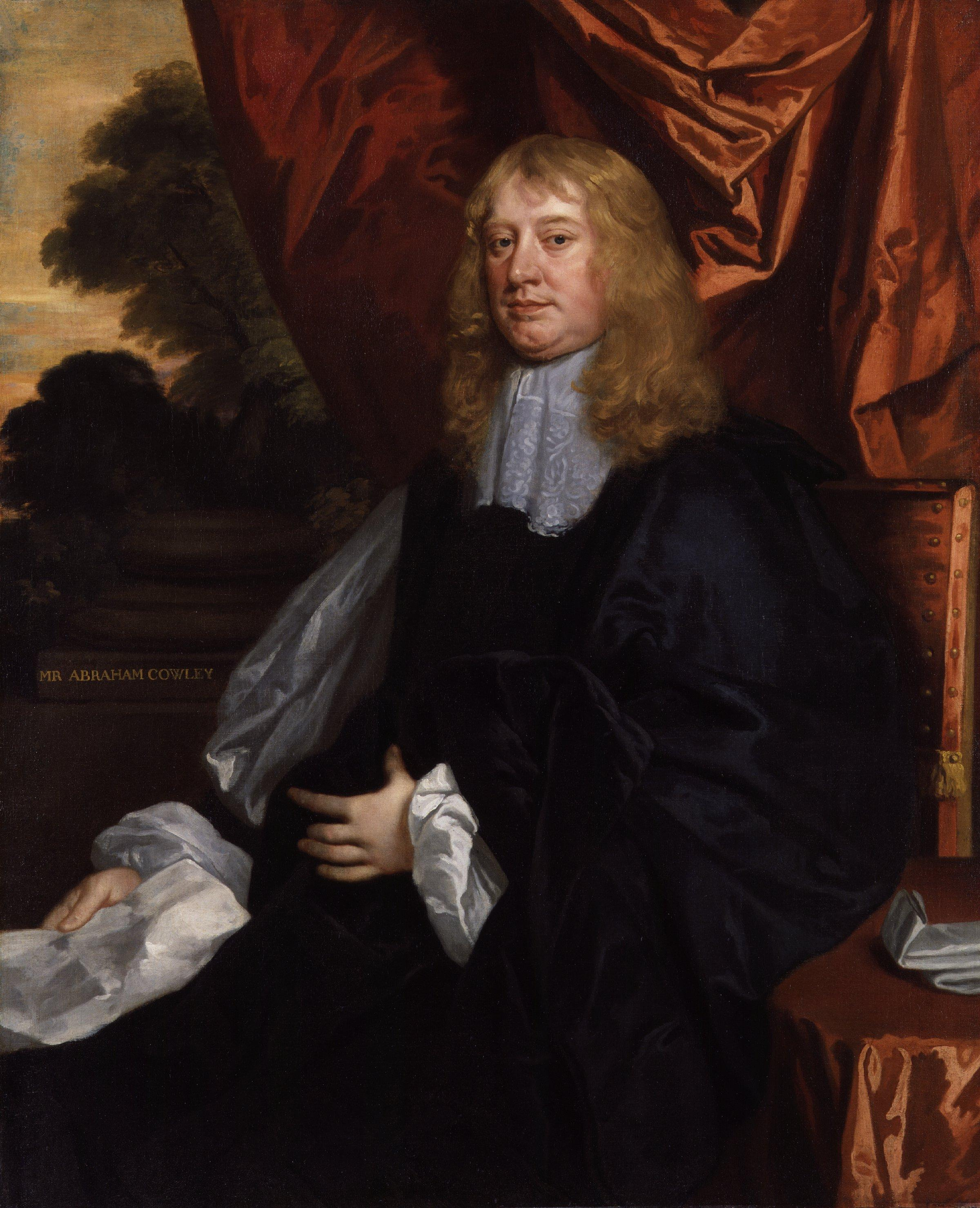
Abraham Cowley, portrait by Peter Lely

Abraham Cowley (/ˈkuːli/; 1618 – 28 July 1667) was an English poet and essayist born in the City of London late in 1618. He was one of the leading English poets of the 17th century, with 14 printings of his Works published between 1668 and 1721.

== Early life and career ==
Cowley's father, a wealthy Londoner, who died shortly before his birth, was a stationer. His mother was wholly given to works of devotion, but it happened that there lay in her parlour a copy of The Faerie Queene. This became the favourite reading of her son, and he had read it twice before he was sent to school.

As early as 1628, when he was only ten years old, he composed his Tragicall Historie of Piramus and Thisbe, an epic romance written in a six-line stanza, a style of his own invention. It has been considered to be a most astonishing feat of imaginative precocity; it is marked by no great faults of immaturity, and possesses constructive merits of a very high order. Two years later, Cowley wrote another and still more ambitious poem, Constantia and Philetus; around this time he was sent to Westminster School. At Westminster he displayed extraordinary mental precocity and versatility, writing when he was just thirteen the Elegy on the Death of Dudley, Lord Carlton. These three lengthy poems, and some smaller ones, were collected in 1633, and published in a volume entitled Poeticall Blossomes, dedicated to Lambert Osbaldeston, the headmaster of the school, and prefaced by many laudatory verses by schoolfellows.

Cowley at once became famous, although he was only fifteen years old. His next composition was a pastoral comedy, entitled Loves Riddle, a marvellous production for a boy of sixteen, airy, correct and harmonious in language, and rapid in movement. The style is not without resemblance to that of the poet Thomas Randolph, whose earliest works had only just been printed.

In 1637 Cowley went up to Trinity College, Cambridge, where he "betook himself with enthusiasm to the study of all kinds of learning, and early distinguished himself as a ripe scholar". Portraits of Cowley, attributed to William Faithorne and Stephen Slaughter, are in Trinity College's collection. It was about this time that he composed his scriptural epic on the history of King David, one book of which still exists in the Latin original. An English version of the epic in four books, called the Davideis, was published after his death. The epic deals with the adventures of King David from his boyhood to the smiting of Amalek by Saul, where it abruptly closes.

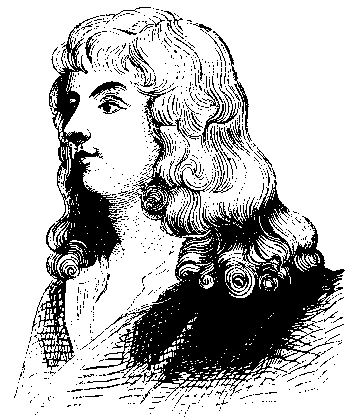
Abraham Cowley

In 1638 Loves Riddle and a Latin comedy, the Naufragium Joculare, were printed, and in 1641 the passage of Prince Charles (later to be King Charles II) through Cambridge led to the production of another dramatic work, The Guardian, which was performed before the royal visitor with much success. During the civil war this play was privately performed at Dublin, but it was not printed till 1650. It is bright and amusing, in the style common to the "sons" of Ben Jonson, the university wits who wrote more for the closet than the public stage.

== Royalist in exile ==
The learned quiet of the young poet's life was disrupted by the Civil War in 1642 as he warmly espoused the royalist side. He became a fellow of Trinity College, Cambridge, but was ejected by the Parliamentarians in 1643. He made his way to Oxford, where he enjoyed the friendship of Lord Falkland, and gained the personal confidence of the royal family. Around this time, he published two anti-Puritan satires: A Satyre Against Separatists (attribution sometimes disputed), printed in 1642, and The Puritan and the Papist (1643).

After the Battle of Marston Moor he followed the queen to Paris, where his exile lasted twelve years. This period was spent almost entirely in the royal service, "bearing a share in the distresses of the royal family, or labouring in their affairs. To this purpose he performed several dangerous journeys into Jersey, Scotland, Flanders, the Netherlands, or wherever else the king's troubles required his attendance. But the chief testimony of his fidelity was the laborious service he underwent in maintaining the constant correspondence between the late king and the queen his wife. In that weighty trust he behaved himself with indefatigable integrity and unsuspected secrecy; for he ciphered and deciphered with his own hand the greatest part of all the letters that passed between their majesties, and managed a vast intelligence in many other parts, which for some years together took up all his days, and two or three nights every week."

In spite of these labours he did not refrain from writing. During his exile he became familiar with the works of Pindar, and determined to reproduce their lofty lyric passion in English. However, Cowley misunderstood Pindar's metrical practice and therefore his reproduction of the Pindaric ode form in English did not accurately reflect Pindar's poetics. But despite this problem, Cowley's use of iambic lines of irregular length, pattern, and rhyme scheme was very influential and these types of odes are still known in English as Pindarics, Irregular Odes or Cowleyan Odes. Some of the most famous odes written after Cowley in the Pindaric tradition are Coleridge's "Ode on the Departing Year" and Wordsworth's "Ode: Intimations of Immortality".

During his exile, Cowley wrote a history of the Civil War (which did not get published in full until 1973). In the preface to his 1656 Poems, Cowley mentioned that he had completed three books of an epic poem on the Civil War, but had left it unfinished after the First Battle of Newbury when the Royalist cause began to lose significant ground. In the preface, Cowley indicated that he had destroyed all copies of the poem, but this was not precisely the truth. In 1679, twelve years after Cowley's death, a shortened version of the first book of the poem, called A Poem on the Late Civil War was published. It was assumed that the rest of the poem had indeed been destroyed or lost until the mid-20th century when scholar Allan Pritchard discovered the first of two extant manuscript copies of the whole poem among the Cowper family papers. Thus, the three completed books of Cowley's great (albeit unfinished) English epic, The Civill Warre (otherwise spelled "The Civil War"), was finally published in full for the first time in 1973.

In 1647 a collection of his love verses, entitled The Mistress, was published, and in the next year a volume of wretched satires, The Four Ages of England, was brought out under his name, with the composition of which he had nothing to do. In spite of the troubled times, usually so fatal to poetic fame, his reputation steadily increased, and when, on his return to England in 1656, he published a volume of his collected poetical works, he found himself without a rival in public esteem. This volume included the Pindarique Odes, the Davideis, The Mistress and some Miscellanies. Among the latter are to be found Cowley's most vital pieces. This section of his works opens with the famous aspiration:

What shall I do to be for ever known,
And make the coming age my own?

It contains elegies on Wotton, Vandyck, Falkland, William Hervey and Crashaw, the last two being among Cowley's finest poems, brilliant, sonorous and original; the amusing ballad of The Chronicle, giving a fictitious catalogue of his supposed amours; various gnomic pieces; and some charming paraphrases from Anacreon. The Pindarique Odes contain weighty lines and passages, buried in irregular and inharmonious masses of moral verbiage. Not more than one or two are good throughout, but a full posy of beauties may easily be culled from them. The long cadences of the Alexandrines with which most of the strophes close, continued to echo in English poetry from Dryden down to Gray, but the Odes themselves, which were found to be obscure by the poet's contemporaries, immediately fell into disesteem.

The 1656 edition includes the notorious passage in which Cowley abjures his loyalty to the crown: "yet when the event of battle, and the unaccountable will of God has determined the controversie, and that we have submitted to the conditions of the Conqueror, we must lay down our Pens as well as Arms, we must march out of our Cause itself, and dismantle that, as well as our own Towns and Castles, of all the Works and Fortifications as Wit and Reason by which we defended it."

The Mistress was the most popular poetic reading of the age, and is now the least read of all Cowley's works. It was the last and most violent expression of the amatory affectation of the 17th century, an affectation which had been endurable in Donne and other early writers because it had been the vehicle of sincere emotion, but some find it complex in Cowley because for him it represented nothing but a love sublimation besides a rhetoric exercise, an exhibition of literary richness. He appears to have been of a reserved disposition; in the face of these elaborately erotic volumes, we are told that to the end of his days he never spoke of love to a single woman in real life. The "Leonora" of The Chronicle is said to have been the only woman he ever loved, and she married the brother of his biographer, Sprat.

== Return to England ==
Soon after his return to England he was seized in mistake for another person, and only obtained his liberty on a bail of £1000. In 1658 he revised and altered his play of The Guardian, and prepared it for the press under the title of The Cutter of Coleman Street, but it was not staged until 1661. Late in 1658 Oliver Cromwell died, and Cowley took advantage of the resulting confusion to escape to Paris, where he remained until the Restoration brought him back in Charles's train. In 1662, he published the first two books of Plantarum (Plantarum libri duo). He published in 1663 Verses upon several occasions, in which The Complaint is included.

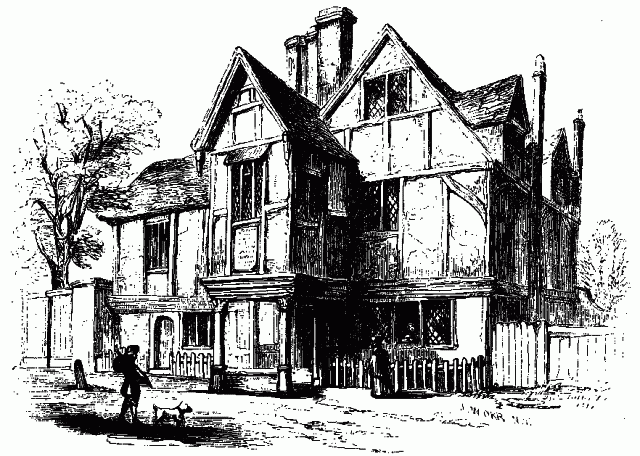
Abraham Cowley's Chertsey house

Cowley obtained permission to retire into the country; and through his friend, Lord St Albans, he obtained a property near Chertsey, where, devoting himself to botany and books, he lived in comparative solitude until his death. He took a practical interest in experimental science, and he was one of those advocating the foundation of an academy for the protection of scientific enterprise. Cowley's pamphlet on The Advancement of Experimental Philosophy, 1661, immediately preceded the foundation of the Royal Society, to which Cowley, in March 1667, at the suggestion of John Evelyn, addressed an ode. He is also known for having provided the earliest reference to coca in English literature, in "Pomona", the fifth book of his posthumously published Latin work Plantarum libri sex (included in Works, 1668; translated as Six Books of Plants in 1689).

He died in the Porch House in Chertsey, in consequence of having caught a cold while superintending his farm-labourers in the meadows late on a summer evening. On 3 August, Cowley was buried in Westminster Abbey beside the ashes of Chaucer and Spenser, where in 1675 the Duke of Buckingham erected a monument to his memory. The poetry of Cowley rapidly fell into neglect.

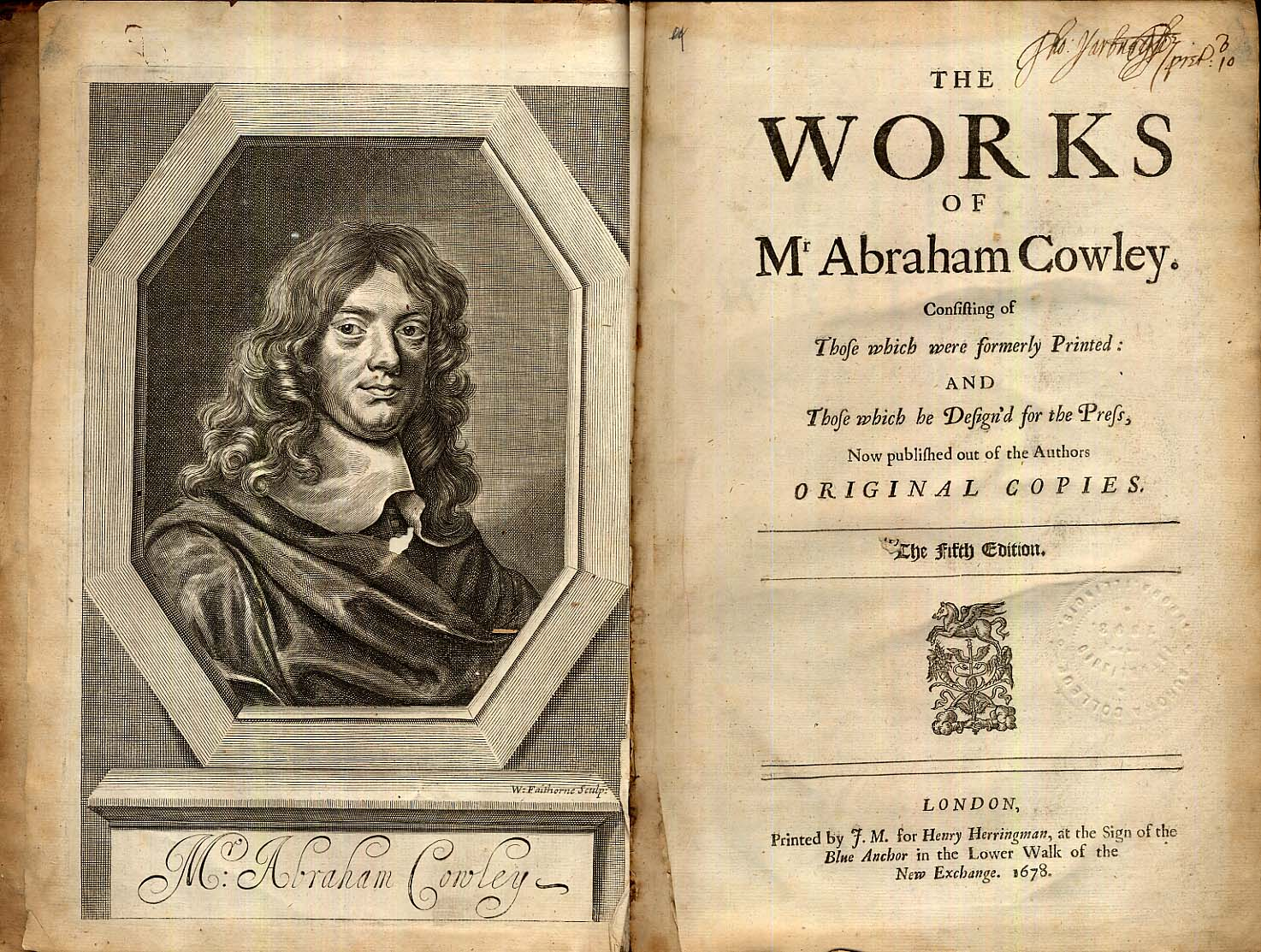
Frontispiece and title page to a 1678 edition of Abraham Cowley's Works

The first volume of Cowley's collected works was published in 1668, when Thomas Sprat brought out an edition in folio, to which he prefixed a life of the poet. This included Poemata Latina, including the Plantarum libri sex (Six Books of Plants). Additional volumes were added in 1681 and 1689. There were many reprints of this collection, which formed the standard edition till 1881, when it was superseded by Alexander Balloch Grosart's privately printed edition in two volumes, for the Chertsey Worthies library. The Essays have frequently been revived.

== Bibliography ==
- Poeticall Blossomes (1633; revised 1636)
- Loves Riddle (1638), a play
- Naufragium Joculare (1638), a play
- The Guardian (1641), a play, later revised as The Cutter of Coleman Street (performed 1661; published 1663)
- A Satyre Against Separatists (1642), also known as The Puritans Lecture
- A Satire: The Puritan and the Papist (1643)
- The Mistress; or, Several Copies of Love-Verses (1647)
- Poems (1656), includes Miscellanies, Anacreontiques, Davideis and Pindarique Odes
- A Proposition for the Advancement of Experimental Philosophy (1661)
- Plantarum libri duo (1662)
- Verses Lately Written Upon Several Occasions (1663)
- Ode to the Royal Society (1667)
- Works (1668), "Consisting of Those which were formerly Printed: and, Those which he Design'd for the Press", includes Essays and Plantarum libri sex
- Works (1681), with a second part, "Being what was Written and Published by himself in his Younger Years"
- Works (1689), with a third part, "Being His Six Books of Plants, Never before Printed in English"

Later compilations

- The Complete Works in Verse and Prose, ed. Alexander B. Grosart (1881)
- Cowley's Essays, ed. Henry Morley (Cassell, 1886)
- Prose Works, ed. J. R. Lumby (1887)
- English Writings, ed. A. R. Waller, in two volumes (Cambridge, 1905–06)
- The Mistress with Other Select Poems, ed. John Sparrow (Nonesuch, 1926)
- The Crypto-Mistress: Love Poems (Golden Eagle Press, 1948)
- Poetry and Prose, ed. L. C. Martin (Oxford, 1949)
- The Collected Works, Volume 1, ed. Thomas O. Calhoun and Laurence Heyworth (University of Delaware Press, 1989)
- The Collected Works, Volume 2, Part 1, ed. Thomas O. Calhoun, Laurence Heyworth and J. Robert King (University of Delaware Press, 1993)
- Selected Poems, ed. David Hopkins and Tom Mason (Carcanet, 1994)
- Love Poems, ed. Anthony Astbury (Greville Press, 1995)
