= George Thomas Stokes =

Irish ecclesiastical historian

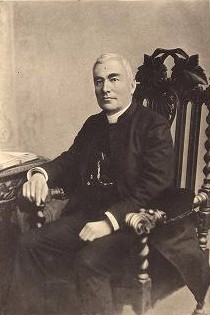
George Thomas Stokes

George Thomas Stokes (1843–1898) was an Irish ecclesiastical historian.

== Life ==
He was the eldest son of John Stokes of Athlone and Margaret Forster his wife, born on 28 December 1843 in Athlone, Ireland. He was educated at Galway grammar school, Queen's College, Galway, and at Trinity College, Dublin, where he graduated B.A. in 1864. He subsequently proceeded M.A. 1871, B.D. 1881, and D.D. 1886.

In 1866, Stokes was ordained for the curacy of Dunkerrin in the diocese of Killaloe in the then established Church of Ireland, and in the following year was appointed to the curacy of St. Patrick's, Newry. In 1868, he was nominated first vicar of the newly constituted charge of All Saints, Newtown Park, Co. Dublin, which he held till his death. In 1893, he was elected by the chapter of St Patrick's Cathedral, Dublin, to the prebend and canonry of St. Andrew.

From the date of his appointment to All Saints, Stokes studied Irish ecclesiastical history of his own country. Dr. Reichel made him his deputy in the chair of ecclesiastical history in the university of Dublin; and in 1883, Stokes was appointed his successor. Ireland and the Celtic Church, published in 1886, achieved an immediate success. It was followed in 1888 by his Ireland and the Anglo-Norman Church, in which the history of Irish Christianity was traced through a further stage.

Stokes took on for the Expositor's Bible a "Commentary on the Acts of the Apostles" (1891). In 1887, he published, as the second volume of a Sketch of Universal History, a Sketch of Mediaeval History. In 1891, he published an edition of Bishop Pococke's Tour in Ireland. He was an occasional contributor on subjects connected with theology and ecclesiastical history to the Contemporary Review. Among many articles in this periodical, that on Alexander Knox and the Oxford Movement is perhaps the most important (August 1887); and he produced numerous papers before the Royal Society of Antiquaries in Ireland, and the Royal Irish Academy. In 1887, he was appointed librarian of St. Patrick's Library, in Dublin, while continuing with clerical duties. In 1890, he was temporarily disabled by a partial stroke of paralysis, from the effects of which he never fully recovered. In 1896, he delivered a series of lectures entitled How to write a Parochial History; and the following year began a course of lectures on Great Irish Churchmen of the Seventeenth and Eighteenth Centuries, which he did not live to complete; they were edited, under the title Some Worthies of the Irish Church (London, 1900), after his death by the Rev. H. J. Lawlor, who succeeded to his professorial chair.

On 24 March 1898, Stokes succumbed, after a brief struggle, to an attack of pneumonia. He was buried at Dean's Grange, Co. Dublin.

== Family ==
Stokes was twice married: first, to Fanny, daughter of Thomas Pusey of Surbiton, Surrey, and secondly to Katherine, daughter of Henry J. Dudgeon of the Priory, Stillorgan, co. Dublin.

== Publications ==
- Ireland and the Celtic Church. A History of Ireland from St Patrick to the English Conquest in 1172 (London, 1886)
- A commentary on the Acts 2 vols, in The Expositor’s Bible (1888)
- Ireland and the Anglo-Norman Church. A History of Ireland and Irish Christianity from the Anglo-Norman Conquest to the Dawn of the Reformation (1889)
- Dudley Loftus: A Dublin Antiquary of the Seventeenth Century (Dublin, 1890)
- The Island Monasteries of Wales and Ireland (1891)
- St Fechin of Fore, and his Monastery (1892)
- Greek in Gaul and Western Europe down to A.D. 700. The Knowledge of Greek in Ireland between A.D. 500 and 900 (1892)
- Calendar of the Liber Niger Alani (1893)
- The Writings of St Patrick, a Translation with Notes (1887) (in collaboration with C. H. H. Wright)
