= Christopher Bennet =

English physician

Christopher Bennet (1617–1655) was an English physician, known as a writer on tuberculosis.

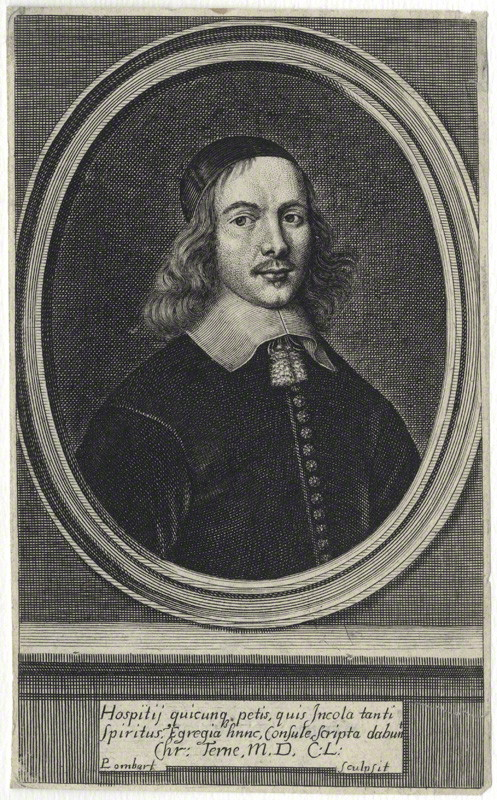
Christopher Bennet

== Life ==
Born in Somerset, he was the son of John Bennet of Raynton. He entered Lincoln College, Oxford in Michaelmas term 1632, graduating B.A. 24 May 1636, and M.A. 24 January 1639. Incorporated M.A. at Cambridge, he became M.D. there in 1646.

On 11 September 1646 Bennett was admitted licentiate of the College of Physicians of London, on 16 July 1647 a candidate, and on 7 December 1649 a Fellow of the College, where he was censor in 1654. He practised first in Bristol, and then in London, where he acquired a reputation.

Bennet's life was cut short by consumption, at the age of 38, on 30 April 1655. He was buried in St Gregory by St Paul's, London.

== Works ==
Bennet is known for his treatise on consumption, Theatri Tabidorum Vestibulum. It deals with various forms of wasting disease, concentrating more with what would be now called pathology than on treatment. It makes constant reference to cases observed and to dissections, rather than to authority. The book gives the first illustration of an inhaler (the term itself was due to John Mudge in the 18th century). The overall approach has been noted as an example of the Baconian method.

Bennet also edited Health's Improvement, or Rules for preparing all sorts of Food by Thomas Muffett, London 1655.

== Notes ==
Attribution

This article incorporates text from a publication now in the public domain: Stephen, Leslie, ed. (1885). "Bennet, Christopher". Dictionary of National Biography. Vol. 4. London: Smith, Elder & Co.
