= Thomas Milles (bishop) =

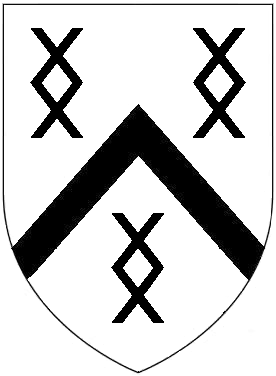
Canting arms of Milles of Cockfield, Suffolk: Argent, a chevron between three millrinds sable. As seen in portrait by George Vertue of Rev. Isaac Miles (1638-1720), Vicar of Highclere. Also on funeral hatchment of Jeremiah Milles III (d.1797) in Sawbridgeworth Church

Thomas Milles (1671–1740) was the Church of Ireland bishop of Waterford and Lismore.

== Life ==
The eldest son of Isaac Milles the elder, he was born at Barley, Hertfordshire, on 19 June 1671. He matriculated at Wadham College, Oxford, on 12 March 1689, was exhibitioner of the college in 1691–2, and graduated B.A. in 1692, M.A. in 1695, and B.D. in 1704.

Having been ordained by Bishop John Hough, he became chaplain of Christ Church, Oxford, in 1694, and was from 1695 to 1707 vice-principal of St Edmund Hall. He was appointed Regius Professor of Greek in 1705–1707. In April 1707 he went to Ireland as chaplain to the new lord-lieutenant, Thomas Herbert, 8th Earl of Pembroke, and on 11 March 1708 was appointed bishop of Waterford and Lismore. He was consecrated in St Patrick's Cathedral, Dublin, on 18 April.

Milles's appointment was unpopular in Ireland, on account of his High Church views. As bishop, Milles took trouble to restore churches. After an episcopate of more than thirty years he died of the stone at Waterford on 13 May 1740, and was buried in Waterford Cathedral. He was unmarried, and left his property to his nephew Rev. Jeremiah Milles (1714-1784), Dean of Exeter.

== Works ==
Milles published in 1703 a folio edition of the works of St Cyril of Jerusalem, with Greek and Latin notes. He wrote controversial tracts and sermons. He also published:

- The Natural Immortality of the Soul asserted and proved from Scripture and the first Fathers, in answer to Mr. Dodwell, Oxford, 1707; 2nd ed. 1726.
- De Officio eorum qui de Fide certant; concio coram Acad. Oxon. 1707.

An Account of the Life and Conversation of Isaac Milles of Highcleer [his father], London, 1721, is also attributed to him.
