= Mary Black (artist) =

English artist (c.1737-1814)

Mary Black (c.1737 – 24 November 1814) was an English artist known for her portrait paintings.

== Biography ==
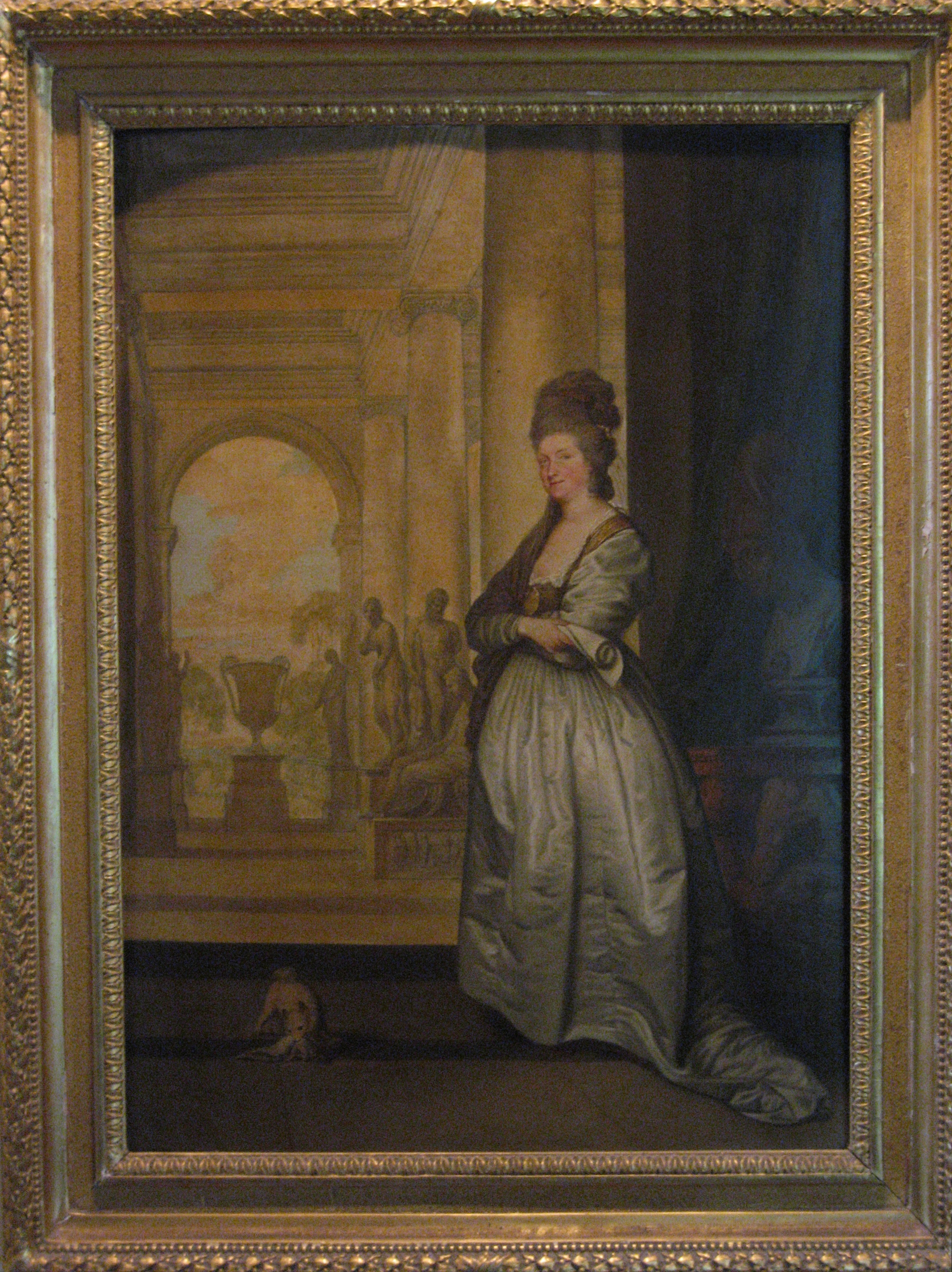
Mary Black in a Sculpture Gallery (by John Downman or William Millar)

Black was born in London the first of two children born to the artist Thomas Black, (1715–1777), and his wife, Mary. By 1760, she was working as an assistant to the artist Allan Ramsay producing copies and reproductions of works by Old Masters. She received a commission to paint portraits of Dr. James Mounsey, a physician in the Russian court, and his cousin Dr. Messenger Mounsey. The latter picture, a three-quarters length portrait, survives and is held by the Royal College of Physicians in London. For many years the painting was attributed to her father. In 1768, Black exhibited four portraits with the Society of Artists and went on to become an honorary member of the society.

As well as painting portraits, Black taught painting to members of a number of fashionable, aristocratic families. Financial success allowed her to live independently while maintaining a household with servants and a carriage. She never married and died suddenly at home in London in 1814.
