= Alexander Brome =

English poet

Alexander Brome (1620 – 30 June 1666) was an English poet.

== Life ==
Brome was by profession an attorney, and was the author of many drinking songs and of satirical verses in favour of the Royalists and in opposition to the Rump Parliament. In 1661, following the Restoration, he published Songs and other Poems, containing songs on various subjects, followed by a series of political songs; ballads, epistles, elegies and epitaphs; epigrams and translations. Izaak Walton wrote an introductory eclogue for this volume in praise of the writer, and his gaiety and wit won him the title of the English Anacreon in Edward Phillips's Theatrum Poetarum.

Brome published a translation of Horace by himself and others in 1666, and was the author of a comedy entitled The Cunning Lovers (1654). He also edited two volumes of Richard Brome's plays.

He died in his house in Barge Yard in the parish of St Stephen Walbrook in the City of London in June 1666, and was buried in the parish church.

== Sources ==
- McWilliams, J. H. (2006). "Brome, Alexander". In Kastan, David Scott (ed.). The Oxford Encyclopedia of British Literature. Oxford University Press.
